= Volodymyr Firman =

Ukrainian Greek Catholic bishop

- Titular Bishop of Limisa, Auxiliary Bishop of Archeparchy of Ternopil–Zboriv
- Church: Ukrainian Greek Catholic Church
- Appointed: 12 July 2023
- Other post: Rector of the Maria Spiritual Centre in Zarvanytsia (since 2016)

Orders
- Ordination: 8 October 2000 by Mykhailo Sabryha
- Consecration: 27 August 2023 by Sviatoslav Shevchuk

Personal details
- Born: Volodymyr Zinoviyovych Firman; 8 May 1976 (age 50) Zarvanytsia, Ternopil Oblast, Ukrainian SSR
- Denomination: Ukrainian Greek Catholic
- Coat of arms

Bishop Volodymyr Firman (Ukrainian: Володимир Фірман; born 8 May 1976) is a Ukrainian Greek Catholic hierarch, who serves as Titular Bishop of Limisa and Auxiliary Bishop of the Archeparchy of Ternopil–Zboriv since 12 July 2023.

== Early life and formation ==
Firman was born into a family of clandestine Greek-Catholics with a three children in the village Zarvanytsia of Ternopil Oblast, where he participated in the life of the underground Maria Spiritual Centre. After graduation from the school education, he joined the Major Theological Seminary in Ternopil, where completed his philosophical and theological studies. He was ordained as a deacon on 9 May 1999 and as a priest on 8 October 2000. Both ordinations were made by Bishop Mykhailo Sabryha for then the Eparchy of Ternopil.

== Pastoral career ==
Subsequently, he studied religious sciences at the Catholic University of Lublin, Poland (2004–2006), agronomy at the Podilskiy Agricultural Technical University in Kamianets-Podilskyi (2011–2013) and administrative development at the Ukrainian Catholic University in Lviv (2016).

Firman has held, among others, the following offices: Administrator (since 2000) and then Rector (since 2016) of the Maria Spiritual Centre in his native Zarvanytsia, Vice-Rector of the Major Theological Seminary in Ternopil (since 2004) and Bursar of the Archeparchy of Ternopil–Zboriv (since 2004). He periodically served as a volunteer military chaplain (since 2014).

== Bishop ==
On 12 July 2023 he was confirmed by Pope Francis as an Auxiliary Bishop of the Ukrainian Catholic Archeparchy of Ternopil–Zboriv and appointed as a Titular Bishop of Limisa. He was consecrated as a bishop by Major Archbishop Sviatoslav Shevchuk and co-consecrators: archbishop Vasyl Semeniuk and bishop Bohdan Danylo in the Maria Spiritual Centre in Zarvanytsia on 27 August 2023.

Catholic Church titles
Preceded by John Bura	Titular Bishop of Limisa; 2023–	Incumbent
