= Terentiy Tsapchuk =

Ukrainian Greek Catholic bishop (born 1980)

His Excellency, The Most Reverend Terentiy Tsapchuk O.S.B.M.
- Auxiliary Bishop of Buchach
- Native name: Терентій Цапчук
- Church: Ukrainian Greek Catholic Church
- Diocese: Buchach
- Appointed: 6 August 2026
- Other post: Titular Bishop of Horaea (since 2026)
- Previous posts: Hegumen of the Basilian Monatery in Lutsk (2012–2020) and in Pohonya (2024–2026)

Orders
- Ordination: 26 July 2007 by Iryney Bilyk
- Consecration: 1 October 2026 by Sviatoslav Shevchuk

Personal details
- Born: Vasyl Tsapchuk; 21 July 1980 (age 46) Nazarenkove, Ivano-Frankivsk Oblast, Ukrainian SSR
- Education: Pontifical Faculty of Theology, Warsaw; Major Seminary of the Latin Archdiocese of Lviv, Catholic University of Lublin
- Motto: Peace in heaven and on earth
- Coat of arms

Terentiy Vasyl Tsapchuk, O.S.B.M. (Ukrainian: Терентій Василь Цапчук; born 21 July 1980) is a Ukrainian Greek Catholic hierarch who has served as an bishop of the Ukrainian Greek Catholic Church. On 6 August 2026, Pope Leo XIV granted assent to his election by the Synod of Bishops of the Ukrainian Greek Catholic Church as Auxiliary Bishop of the Eparchy of Buchach, assigning him the titular see of Horaea.

== Early life and education ==
Tsapchuk was born on 21 July 1980 in the village of Chortovets (then Nazarenkove), Ivano-Frankivsk Oblast. He entered the Order of Saint Basil the Great on 4 November 1998 and made his perpetual profession on 19 August 2006.

After completing preparatory formation at the Basilian Institute in Zolochiv (2000–2001), he studied philosophy at the Pontifical Faculty of Theology in Warsaw (2001–2003). He subsequently studied theology at the Major Seminary of the Latin Archdiocese of Lviv in Briukhovychi (2003–2007), while continuing his religious formation at the Basilian Institute there.

He was ordained to the priesthood on 26 July 2007 by Bishop Iryney Bilyk. In 2016, he received a licentiate degree in Church History from the Catholic University of Lublin (Poland).

== Ministry ==
Following his ordination, Tsapchuk served in a variety of pastoral, educational and administrative roles within the Basilian Order. He ministered in Basilian communities in Ukraine and completed higher theological studies, obtaining a licentiate in theology. He later became a hegumen of the Basilian monastery in Lutsk (2012–2020) and in Pohonya (2024–2026).

On 6 August 2026, Pope Leo XIV granted assent to his canonical election by the Synod of Bishops of the Ukrainian Greek Catholic Church as Auxiliary Bishop of Buchach and assigned him the titular see of Horaea.

On 1 October 2026, Tsapchuk was consecrated a bishop at the Cathedral of Saints Peter and Paul in Chortkiv, with Major Archbishop Sviatoslav Shevchuk as the principal consecrator and Bishop Dmytro Hryhorak, O.S.B.M., and Archbishop Teodor Martynyuk, M.S.U., as co-consecrators.
