= Severiana =

Severiana may refer to:

- Severiana (cicada), genus of insect
- Castra Severiana, an ancient town of the Roman province of Mauretania Caesariensis (Algeria)
  - Diocese of Castra Severiana, former diocese in Mauretania Caesariensis and now a titular Catholic see
- Diocese of Severiana, former diocese in Byzacena (Tunisia) and now a titular Catholic see
- Via Severiana, an ancient Roman road in central Italy
- Domus Severiana, an extension to the imperial palaces on the Palatine Hill in Rome
