= History of Ternopil =

History of the city, Ternopil, Ukraine

The history of Ternopil describes the history of the city of Ternopil, located in modern day Ukraine.

== History ==
Historical affiliations

Kingdom of Poland 1540–1569
Polish-Lithuanian Commonwealth 1569–1772
Austrian Habsburg Monarchy 1772–1809
Russian Empire 1809–1815
Austrian Empire 1815–1867
Austro-Hungarian Empire 1867–1918
West Ukr. People's Republic 1918–1919
Ukrainian People's Republic 1919–1920
Second Polish Republic 1920–1920
Soviet Union (Galician SSR) 1920–1920
Second Polish Republic 1920–1939
Soviet Union (Ukrainian SSR) 1939–1941
German Third Reich 1941–1944
Soviet Union (Ukrainian SSR) 1944–1991
Ukraine 1991–present

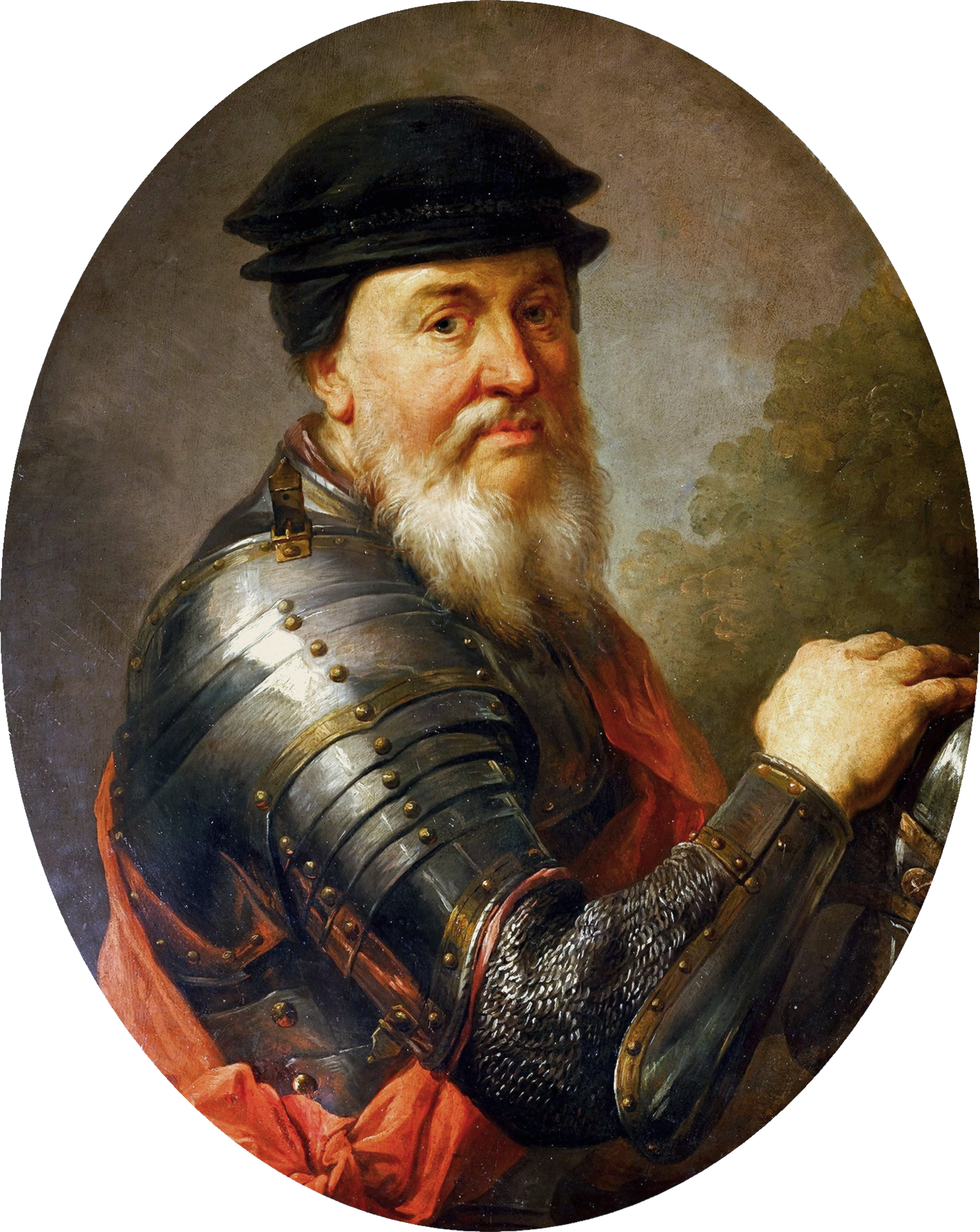
Jan Amor Tarnowski.

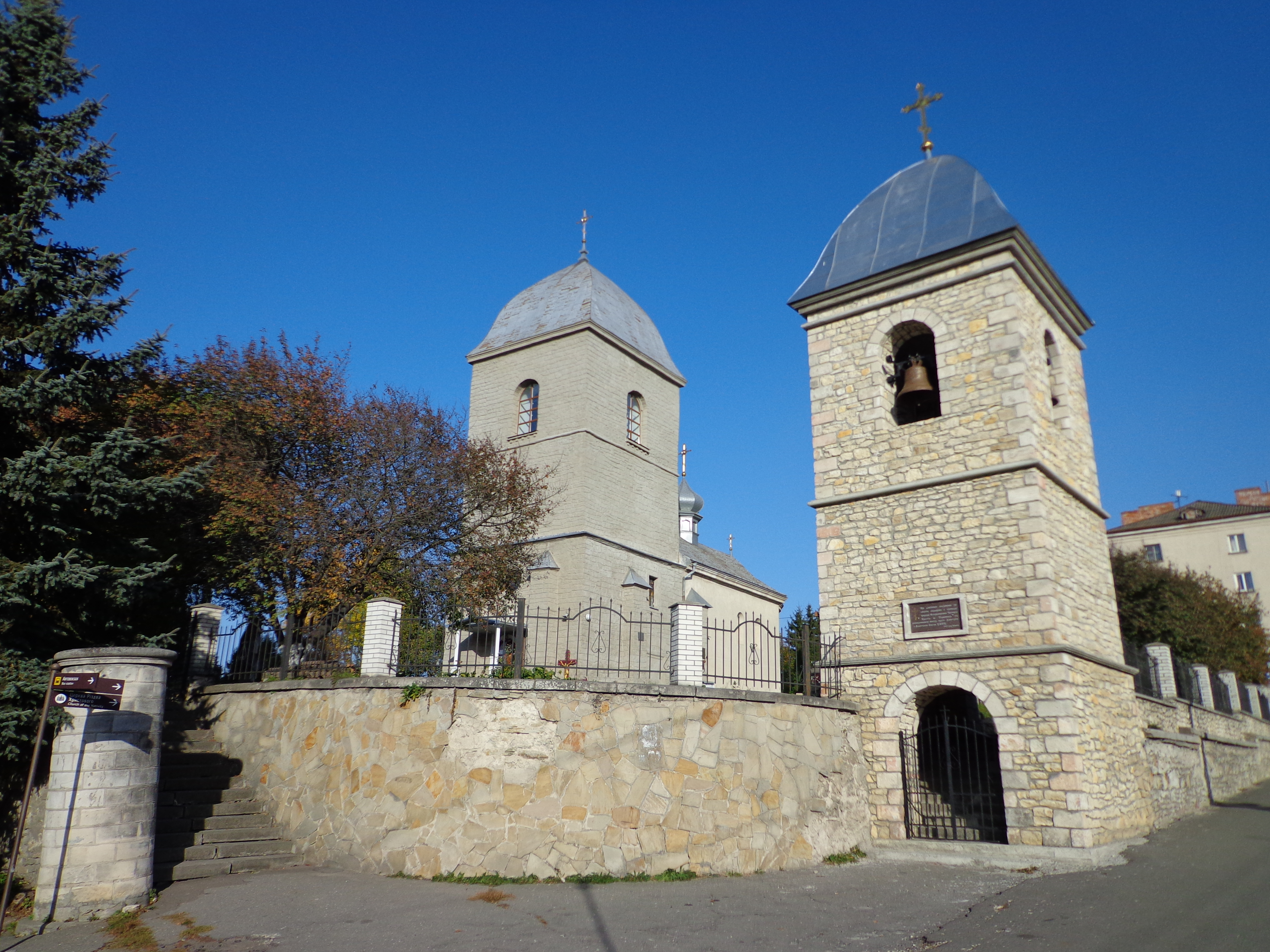
City's first church, Exaltation of Cross Church

The city was founded in 1540 by Polish commander and Hetman Jan Amor Tarnowski, as a military stronghold and castle. On 15 April 1540, the King of Poland Sigismund I in Kraków handed Tarnowski a permission for the establishment of Tarnopol settlement, in the vicinity of Sopilcze (Sopilche). Its Polish name "Tarnopol" means "Tarnowski's city" and stems from a combination of the founder's family name and the Greek term "polis". The etymology of the Tarnowski family surname, originating from the city of Tarnów (and thus the Ukrainian name "Ternopil"), is explained as derived from a field covered with thorns (Ukrainian: терен поле, romanized: teren pole, lit. 'thorn field'). The city's coat of arms is based on the Tarnowski family Leliwa coat of arms.

In 1544, the Tarnopol Castle was completed and repelled the first Tatar attacks. On 20 January 1548, Tarnopol was granted legal rights by the King of Poland Sigismund I the Old which allowed the town to hold three fairs annually, and weekly trades on Mondays. Tarnopol received Magdeburg city rights two years later from Jan Tarnowski, regulating the duties of town residents. In 1548 the King of Poland also gave permission to create a pond near the Tarnopol suburb of Kutkovets. In 1549 the city managed to survive a Tatar siege by efforts of the Polish Duchess Eudokia Czartoryska (see House of Czartoryski). After the death of the Crown Hetman in 1561, Tarnopol became the property of his son Jan Krzysztof Tarnowski, who died childless in 1567. Since then, the city was owned by the daughter of Crown Hetman Zofia Tarnowska who was married to Konstanty Wasyl Ostrogski. In 1570, she died in childbirth, and Tarnopol was passed to the Ostrogski family. In 1575 it was plundered by the Tatars. In 1623 the city passed to the Zamoyski family. In 1589 Tarnopol was visited by the Austrian diplomat Erich Lassota von Steblau who also mentioned the city's castle.

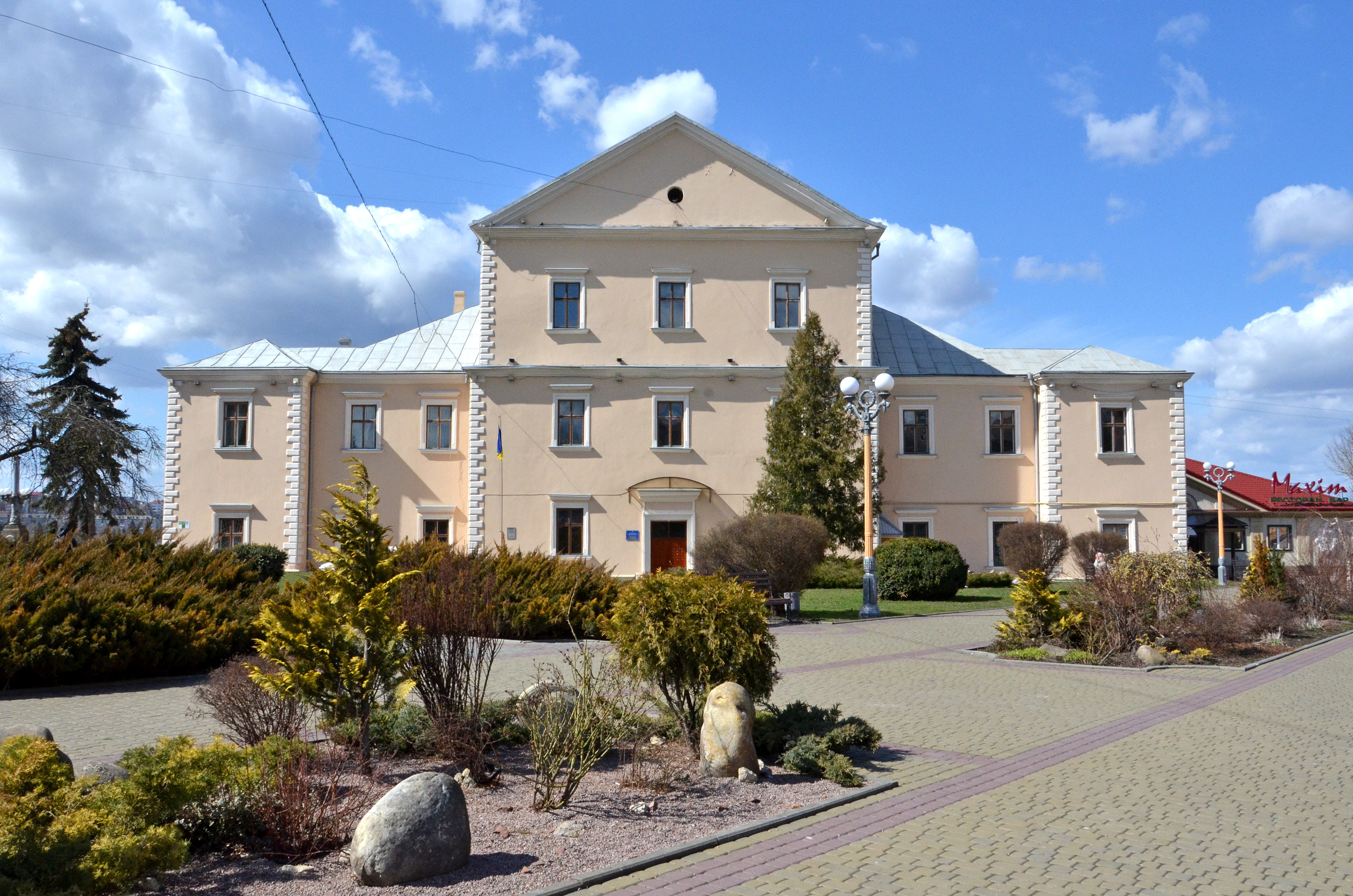
The Ternopil Castle, rebuilt in the 19th century as a palace.

With the ongoing 1648–1654 Khmelnytsky Uprising, many residents of the city joined the ranks of the Khmelnytsky forces particularly during the 1649 Siege of Zbarazh that is located just 20 km (12 miles). In September 1655 the united army of Muscovite and Ukrainian Cossack forces occupied Ternopil among other cities as it was moving towards Lwów (Lviv).

During the 1672–1676 Polish–Ottoman War, Tarnopol was almost completely destroyed by Turkish forces of Ibrahim Shishman Pasha in 1675 and rebuilt by Aleksander Koniecpolski but did not recover its previous glory until it passed to Marie Casimire, the wife of king John III Sobieski in 1690. The city was later sacked for the last time by Tatars in 1694, and twice by Russians in the course of the Great Northern War in 1710 and the War of the Polish Succession in 1733. In 1747 Józef Potocki invited the Dominicanes and founded the beautiful late-baroque Dominican Church (today the Cathedral of the Immaculate Conception of The Blessed Virgin Mary of the Ternopil-Zboriv archeparchy of the Ukrainian Greek Catholic Church). The city was looted during the Confederation of Bar (1768–1772) by the confederates, the king's army, and by the Russians. In 1770 it was devastated by an outbreak of smallpox.

In 1772, after the First Partition of Poland, the city came under Austrian rule. In 1809, after the War of the Fifth Coalition, the city came under Russian rule, incorporated into the newly created Ternopol krai. In 1815 the city (then with 11,000 residents) returned to Austrian rule in accordance with the Congress of Vienna. In 1820 Jesuits expelled from Polotsk by the Russians established a gymnasium in Tarnopol. In 1843 the last city's owner Jerzy Michal of Turkul sold the city to its residents for 175,000 florins. In 1870 the Galician Railway of Archduke Charles Louis connected Tarnopol with Lemberg in Austria-Hungary, accelerating the city's growth. At that time Tarnopol had a population of about 25,000.

=== 20th Century ===
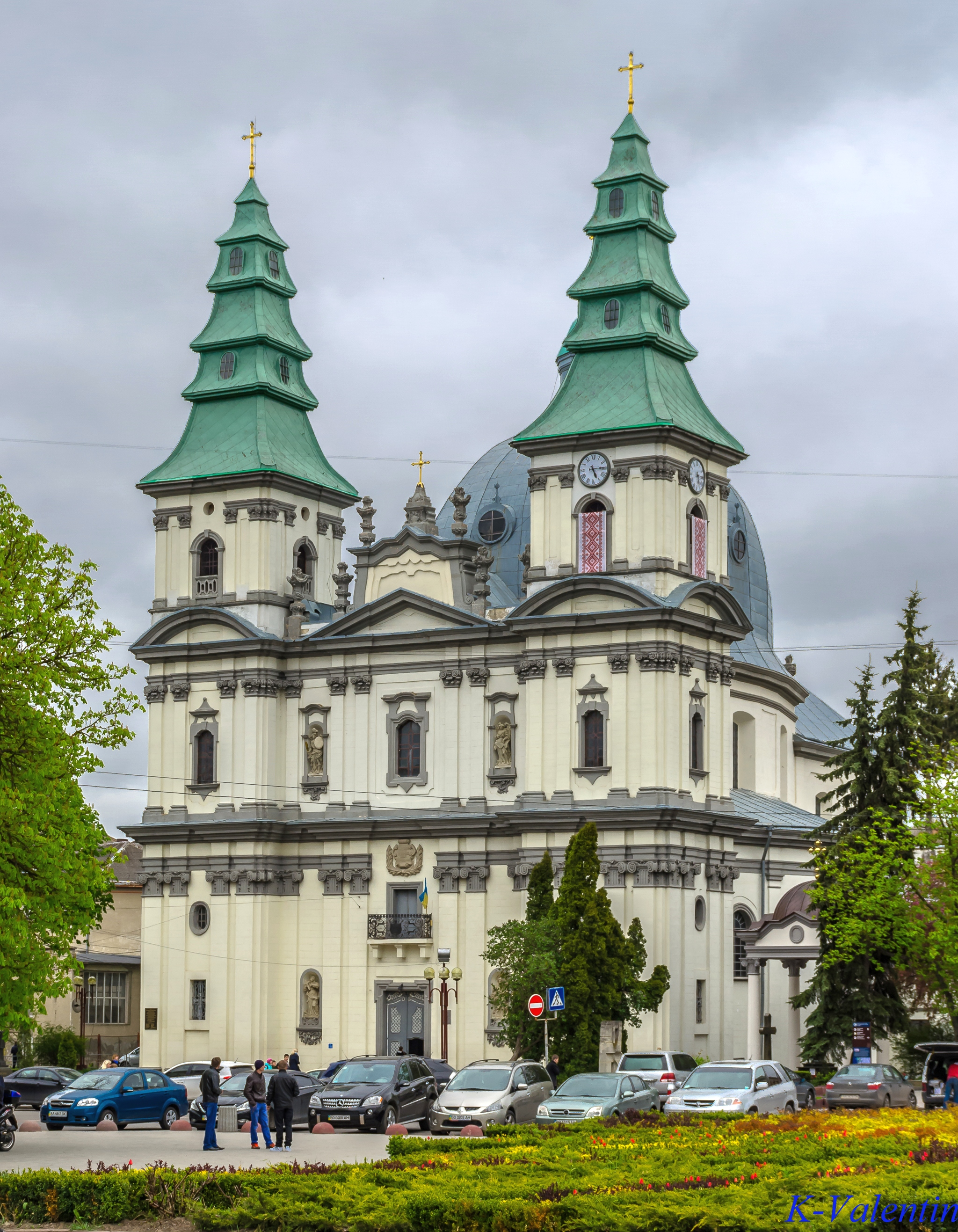

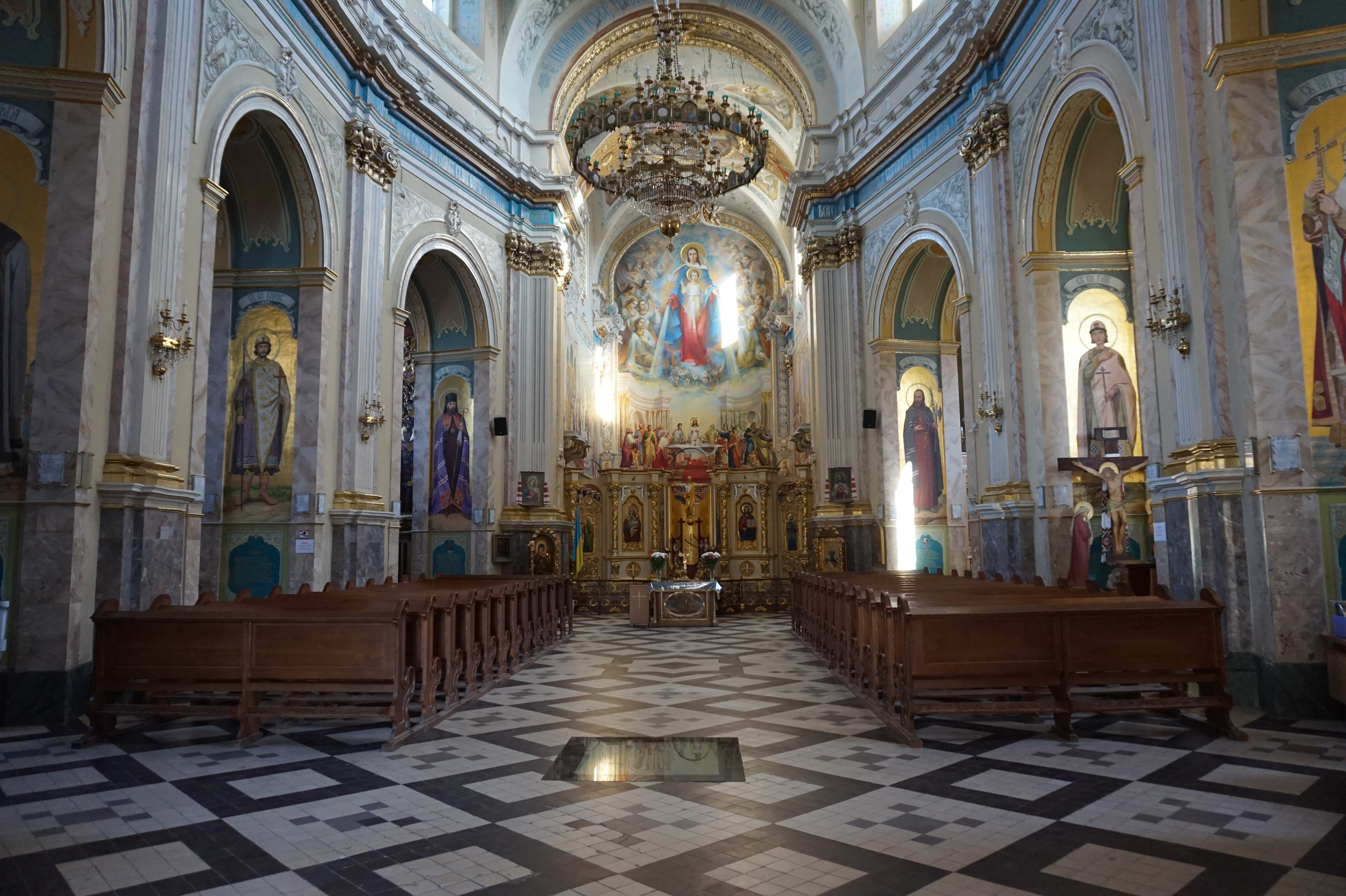
The Ukrainian Greek Catholic Cathedral of the Immaculate Conception of The Blessed Virgin Mary (former Dominican Church).

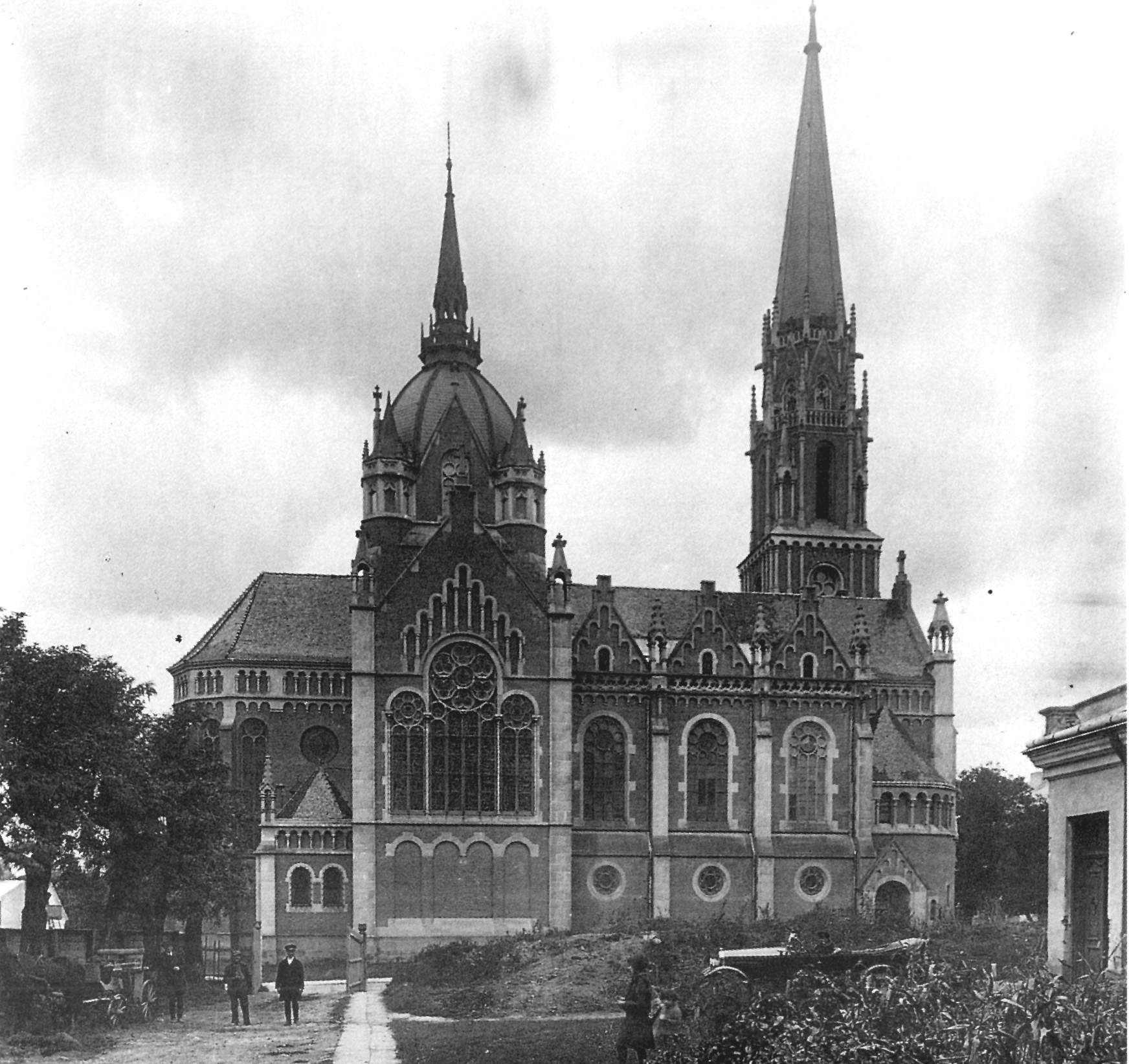
The Church of St. Mary of the Perpetual Assistance was demolished after World War II.

The region was part of Austrian Galicia and was an ethnic mix of mainly Roman Catholic Poles, Greek Catholic Ruthenians, and Jews. Intermarriage between Poles and Ruthenians was common. Church of St. Mary of the Perpetual Assistance was consecrated in 1908, with its main tower reaching 62 m (203 ft). In 1954, the church was blown up by Communist authorities and in its place, the city's central supermarket was built. During World War I the city passed from German and Austrian forces to Russia several times. In 1917, the city and its castle were burnt down by fleeing Russian forces. After the dissolution of the Austro-Hungarian Empire, the city was proclaimed as part of the West Ukrainian People's Republic on 11 November 1918. After Polish forces captured Lwów during the Polish-Ukrainian War, Tarnopol became the country's temporary capital (22 November to 30 December 1918). After the act of union between the West Ukrainian Republic and the Ukrainian People's Republic (UPR), Ternopol formally passed under the UPR's control. On 15 July 1919, the city was captured by Polish forces. In 1920 the exiled Ukrainian government of Symon Petlura accepted Polish control of Tarnopol and of the entire area after receiving the assurance of Józef Piłsudski, the Lithuanian born Field Marshal of the Polish Army, that there would be no peace with the Russians without creating a Ukrainian state. In July and August 1920 the Red Army captured Tarnopol in the course of the Polish-Soviet War. The city then served as the capital of the Galician Soviet Socialist Republic. Although the Poles and their Ukrainian allies badly defeated the Russians on the battle field and the Russians had offered to cede Ukraine and Belarus, Polish politicians in Warsaw refused to honor Piłsudski's promise. By the terms of the Riga treaty, the Soviets and Poles effectively partitioned Ukraine. For the next 19 years, the ethnically mixed Ternopol area remained in Polish control.

After Poland established control over the West Ukrainian People's Republic, the Polish government started political repressions against ethnic Ukrainians, which culminated in the Pacification of Ukrainians in Eastern Galicia in 1930.

From 1922 to September 1939, Tarnopol served as the capital of the Tarnopol Voivodeship that consisted of 17 powiats. According to the Polish census of 1931, individuals speaking Ukrainian/Ruthenian accounted for 46% of the Tarnopol Voivodeship, while Polish speaking population consisted of 49%. The city itself consisted of 77.7% Poles, 14.0% Jewish and 8.05% Ukrainian/Ruthenian population. After World War II, Communist Party historians reported that Edward Szturm de Sztrem, the pre-war chairman of the Polish census statistical office, admitted that the census returns, particularly those from the south-east, had been altered at the executive level. Another account stated that he admitted "that officials had been directed to undercount minorities, especially those in the eastern provinces".

=== World War II ===
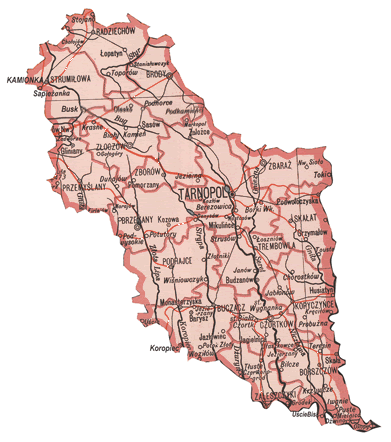
Tarnopol Voivodeship.

At the onset of World War II, the Soviet invasion of Poland began on September 17, 1939. The Red Army entered eastern Poland in furtherance of the secret Molotov–Ribbentrop Pact and contrary to the Soviet–Polish Non-Aggression Pact. Tarnopol was captured, renamed Ternopol (in Russian) or Ternopil (in Ukrainian), and incorporated into the Ukrainian Soviet Socialist Republic under Ternopol Oblast. The Soviets made it their first priority to decimate the Polish intelligentsia and destroy Ukrainian political movements. Ukrainian nationalist leaders were imprisoned. Mass arrests, torture, and executions of Ukrainians, Poles and Jews followed. The Soviets also carried out mass deportations of "enemies of the working class" to Kazakhstan. In practice, this translated into members of the former state administration, police, border service, and land and business owners, Christians and Jews alike.

On 2 July 1941, the city was occupied by the Nazis who immediately led a Jewish pogrom, partly assisted by the local population. Several thousand Jews were murdered until the Germans ordered the pogrom stopped. Between then and July 1943, 10,000 Jews were murdered by Nazi Germans, another 6,000 were rounded up and sent to Belzec extermination camp, and a few hundred others to labor camps. During most of this time Jews lived in the Tarnopol Ghetto. Many Ukrainians were sent as forced labour to Germany.

In the years 1942–1943, the Polish Armia Krajowa was active opposing Nazi rule and performing operations in a bid to incorporate Ternopil into a future Polish state. Ukrainians, politically represented by Organization of Ukrainian Nationalists (OUN), on the other hand, fought for the creation of their independent state. In the years 1942 – 1949, Ukrainian Insurgent Army (UPA) was active in Ternopil region and battled for independence of Ukraine (opposing Nazis, Polish Armia Krajowa and People's Army of Poland as well as the Soviets), following Act of restoration of the Ukrainian state proclaimed in Lviv on 30 June 1941.

During the Soviet offensive in March and April 1944, the city was encircled. In March 1944, the city was declared a fortified place (Gates to the Reich) by Adolf Hitler, to be defended until the last round was fired. The stiff German resistance caused extensive use of heavy artillery by the Red Army on March 7–8, resulting in the complete destruction of the city and killing of nearly all German occupants (55 survivors out of 4,500). Unlike many other occasions, where the Germans had practised a scorched earth policy during their withdrawal from territories of the Soviet Union, the devastation was caused directly by the hostilities. Finally, Ternopol was occupied by the Red Army on 15 April 1944. After the second Soviet occupation, 85% of the city's living quarters were destroyed. Due to heavy destruction, the regional seat was moved to Chortkiv.

From 1944 to 1949 (active) and 1949–1956 (localized), the Ukrainian Insurgent Army resisted Soviet rule in the region and fought for Ukraine's independence.

Following the defeat of Nazi Germany, the ethnic Polish population of Ternopil and its region was forcibly deported to postwar Poland and settled in, and near Wrocław (among other locations), as part of Stalinist ethnic cleansing in the Soviet Ukraine. In the following decades, Ternopil was rebuilt in a typical Soviet style and only a few buildings were reconstructed.

=== Jewish Ternopil ===
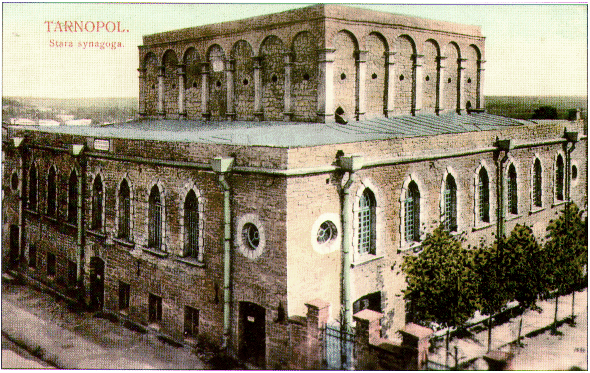
Tarnopol Synagogue prior to destruction during World War II.

Polish Jews settled in Ternopil beginning at its founding and soon formed a majority of the population. During the 16th and 17th centuries there were 300 Jewish families in the city. The Great Synagogue of Ternopil was built in Gothic Survival style between 1622 and 1628.

After the first partition of Poland, Ternopil came under Austrian domination. Nevertheless, Joseph Perl was able to continue his efforts to improve the condition of the Jews, which he had begun under the Russian rule. In 1813 he established a Jewish school which had as its chief object the instruction of Jewish youth in German as well as in Hebrew and in various other subjects. Controversy between the traditional Hasidim and the modernising Maskilim which this school caused, resulted four years later in a victory for the latter, whereupon the institution received official recognition and was placed under communal control. Starting in 1863, the school policy was gradually modified by Polish influences, and very little attention was given to instruction in German. The Tempel für Geregelten Gottesdienst, opened by Perl in 1819, also caused dissensions within the community, and its rabbi, Samuel Judah Löb Rapoport, was forced to withdraw. This dispute also was eventually settled in favour of the Maskilim. As of 1905, the Jewish community numbered 14,000 in a total population of 30,415. Jews took an active role in the import/export trade with Russia conducted through the border city of Pidvolochysk. In 1939, the Jewish population was 18,500.

==== The Holocaust ====
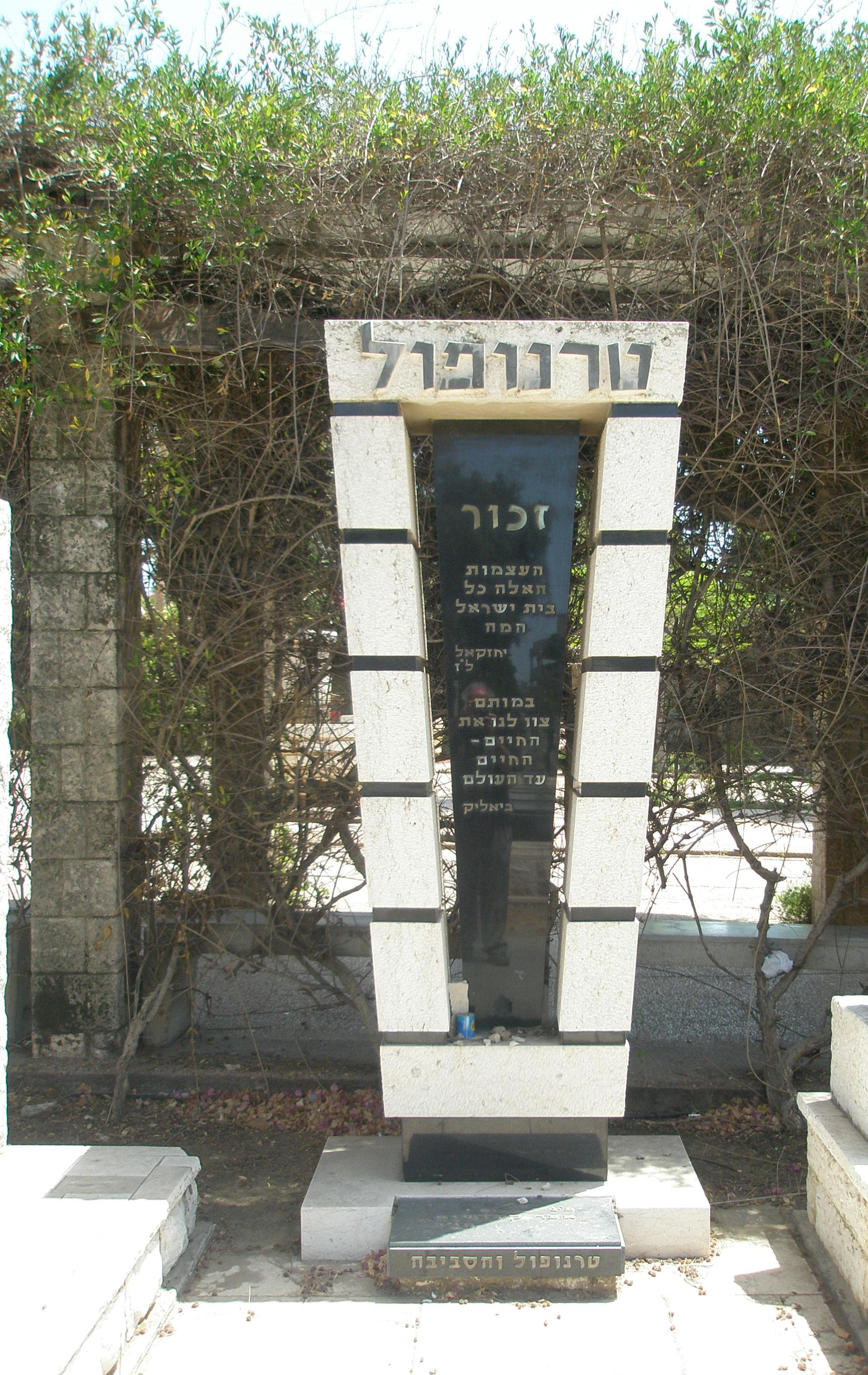
Tarnopol Jewry memorial at Kiriat Shaul cemetery in Tel Aviv

In 1941, soon after the German invasion of the Soviet Union, 2,000 Jews were killed in a pogrom.

In September 1941, the Germans announced the creation of the Tarnopol Ghetto for Jews still remaining in the city. In the winter of 1941–42, mortality in the ghetto escalated to such a degree that the Judenrat was forced to bury the dead in a common grave. Between August 1942 to June 1943 there were 5 "selections" that depleted the Jewish population of the ghetto by sending the Jews to Belzec extermination camp. A few hundred Jews from Tarnopol and its vicinity attempted to survive by hiding within the town limits. Many were denounced to the Germans, including some 200 people shortly before the Soviets established control over the area. A number of Jews survived by hiding with Ukrainians and Poles. A monument in memory of the Holocaust victims was built at Petrikovsky Yar in 1996. On September 19, 2012, the monument was desecrated, in what seems to be an anti-Semitic act.

=== After World War II ===
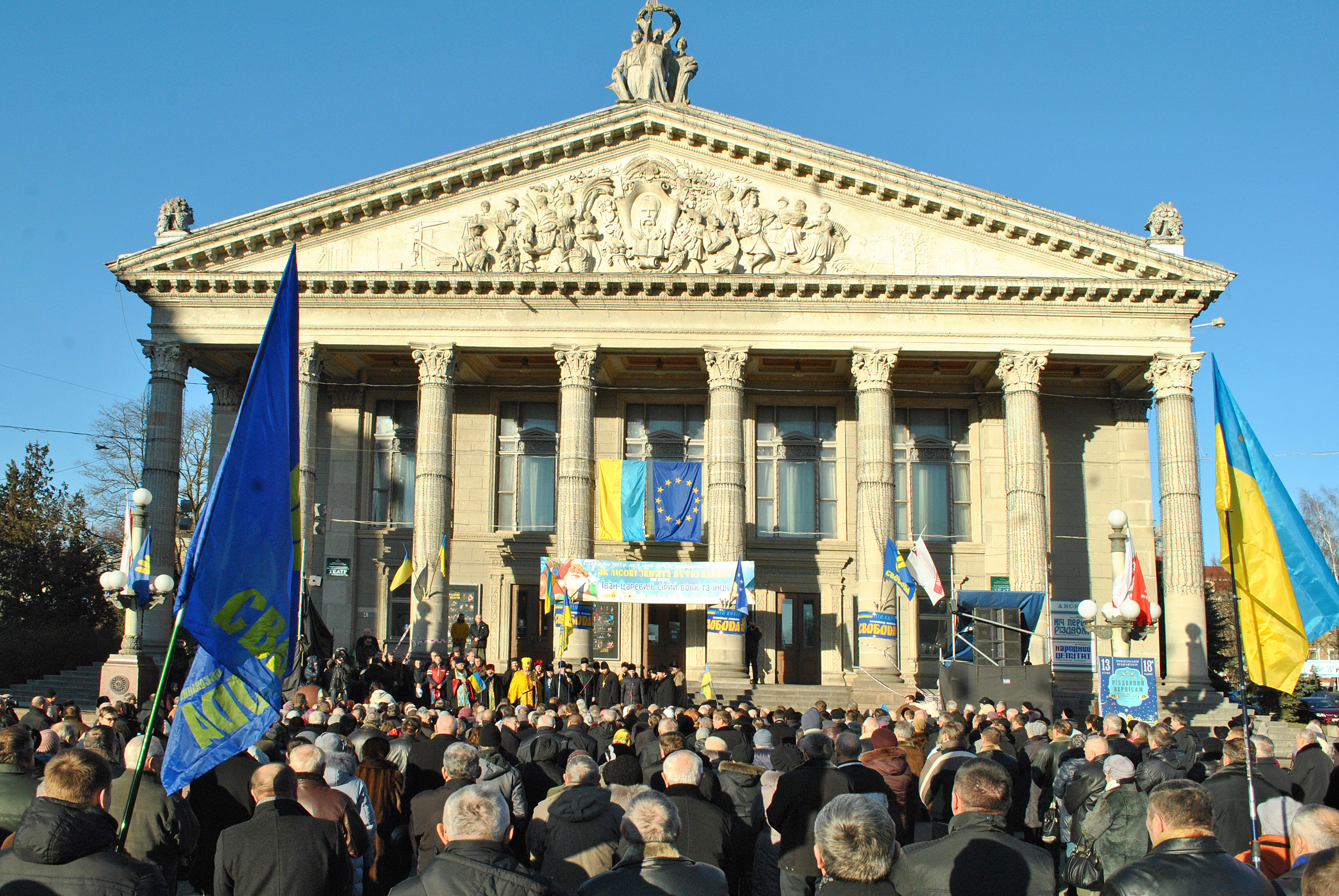
Euromaidan in Ternopil, December 2013

Following Potsdam Conference in 1945, Poland's borders were redrawn and Tarnopol (then again, Терно́поль) was incorporated into the Ukrainian SSR of the Soviet Union. The Polish population was resettled to new Poland before the end of 1946. Following the fall of the Soviet Union, Ternopil has become part of the independent Ukraine.

In 2013, the mayor of the city Serhiy Nadal issued an order which announced the 2013 year as the year of Jan Tarnowski, the Crown Hetman and Voivode. In 2015, the National Bank of Ukraine released jubilee coins commemorating the founder of Ternopil Jan Tarnowski.

Until 18 July 2020, Ternopil was designated as a city of oblast significance and did not belong to Ternopil Raion even though it was the center of the raion. As part of the administrative reform of Ukraine, which reduced the number of raions of Ternopil Oblast to three, the city was merged into Ternopil Raion.
