= Theotokos of Zarvanytsia =

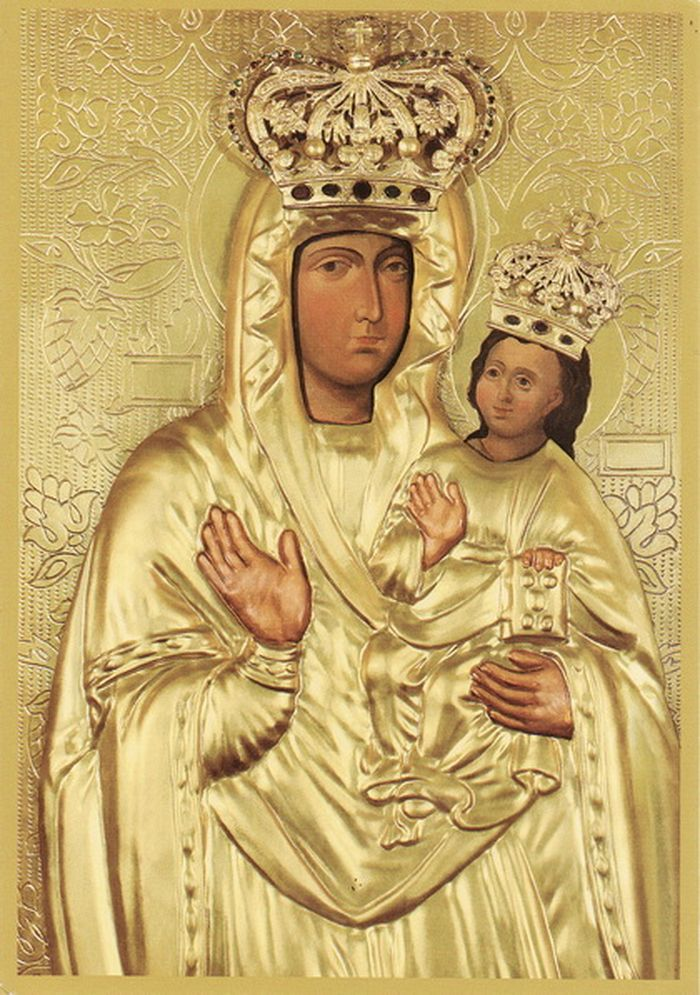
Theotokos of Zarvanytsia

The Theotokos of Zarvanytsia (Ukrainian: Ікона Божої Матері Зарваницької) is a miraculous image (icon) dated to the 17th century, which, according to legend, existed in the 13th century.

It was crowned on 29 June 1867, with the consent of Pope Pius IX, thanks to the efforts of the Greek Catholic parish priest, Porfyrii Mandychevskyi, and the support of Cardinal Giovanni Simeoni.

It is located in the Holy Trinity church in Zarvanytsia.

== Bibliography ==
- (in Ukrainian) Шподарунок Н., Божої Матері Зарваницької Ікона // Ternopil Encyclopedic Dictionary: in 4 v. / editorial board: H. Yavorskyi and other, Ternopil: "Zbruch", 2004, V. 1: А—Й, S. 154–155. — ISBN 966-528-197-6.
- Квич Л. М. З Історії Марійського духовного центру Зарваниця // Наукові записки. — Візуальні мистецтва. — 2011. — Випуск 5. — С. 176—181.
