= Eparchy of Buchach =

Ukrainian Greek Catholic eparchy in Ukraine

Eparchy of Buchach Eparchia Bucacensis Ucrainorum Бучацька єпархія Української греко-католицької церкви
- Coat of arms of Buchach

Location
- Country: Ukraine
- Territory: 7 Raions of Ternopil Oblast
- Ecclesiastical province: Archeparchy of Ternopil–Zboriv
- Headquarters: Chortkiv, Ternopil Oblast, Ukraine

Statistics
- Area: 4,829 km^{2} (1,864 sq mi)
- Population: Total; Catholics: (as of 2012); 382,980; 211,314 (55.2%)

Information
- Sui iuris church: Ukrainian Greek Catholic
- Rite: Byzantine
- Established: 21 July 2000
- Cathedral: Ukrainian Catholic Cathedral of Sts. Peter and Paul in Chortkiv
- Patron saint: Blessed Hryhoriy Khomyshyn

Current leadership
- Pope: Leo XIV
- Major Archbishop: Major Archbishop Sviatoslav Shevchuk
- Bishop: Dmytro Hryhorak, O.S.B.M.
- Metropolitan Archbishop: Teodor Martynyuk Metropolitan of Ternopil–Zboriv
- Auxiliary Bishops: Terentiy Tsapchuk, O.S.B.M.

Map

Website
- Ukrainian Catholic Eparchy of Buchach

Buchach is an eparchy of the Ukrainian Greek Catholic Church situated in Ukraine. The eparchy is suffragan to the Ukrainian Catholic Archeparchy of Ternopil – Zboriv. The eparchy was established on 21 July 2000.

The first and only eparch was Iryney Bilyk, O.S.B.M., who was eparch from 2000 to 2007. However, after his transfer to Rome in July 2007, Bishop Dmytro Hryhorak, O.S.B.M., became the eparch on 23 July 2011.

== History ==
- 21 July 2000: Established as Eparchy of Buchach from the Ukrainian Catholic Eparchy of Ternopil.

== Eparchial bishops ==
The following is a list of the bishops of Buchach and their terms of service:

- (21 July 2000 – 28 July 2007) Iryney Bilyk, O.S.B.M.

(28 July 2007 – 23 July 2011) Fr. Dmytro Hryhorak, O.S.B.M., Apostolic Administrator

- (since 23 July 2011) Dmytro Hryhorak, O.S.B.M.

=== Auxiliary bishop ===
- (since 8 August 2026) Terentiy Tsapchuk, O.S.B.M., titular bishop of Horaea
