= Mykhailo Sabryha =

Ukrainian Greek Catholic bishop (1940–2006)

Mykhailo Sabryha, C.Ss.R.
- Ukrainian Catholic Eparchy of Ternopil–Zboriv
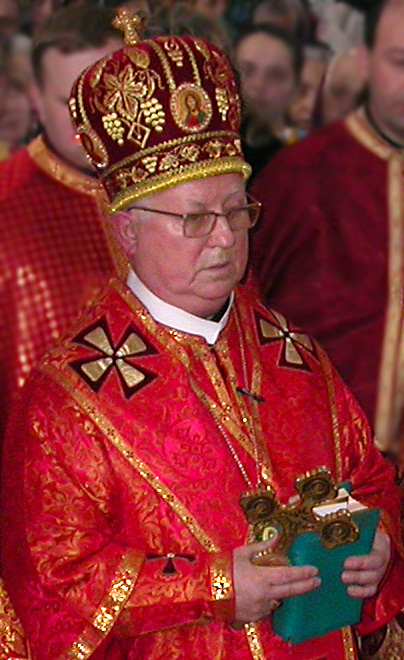
- Church: Ukrainian Greek Catholic Church
- Appointed: 20 April 1993
- In office: 20 April 1993 – 29 June 2006
- Predecessor: New creation
- Successor: Vasyl Semeniuk
- Other posts: Auxiliary Bishop of Ukrainian Catholic Archeparchy of Lviv (1986–1993) Order of Merit (3rd class) in 1999

Orders
- Ordination: 24 February 1974 (Priest) by Volodymyr Sterniuk
- Consecration: 11 October 1986 (Bishop) by Volodymyr Sterniuk

Personal details
- Born: Mykhailo Yosypovych Sabryha; 22 November 1940 Bortkiv, Ukrainian SSR, now Ukraine
- Died: 29 June 2006 (aged 65) Zhytomyr, Ukraine

Mykhailo Sabryha, C.Ss.R. (Ukrainian: Михайло Сабрига; 22 November 1940 – 29 June 2006) was a Ukrainian Greek Catholic hierarch. He was clandestine auxiliary bishop of the Ukrainian Catholic Archeparchy of Lviv from 1986 to 1993 (from 16 January 1991 as titular bishop of Bucellus) and the first eparchial bishop of the new created Ukrainian Catholic Eparchy of Ternopil–Zboriv from 1993 until his death in 2006.

== Life ==
Born in Bortkiv, Soviet Union (present-day – Lviv Oblast, Ukraine) on 1940 in the Greek-Catholic family of Yosyp and Stefaniya with 3 children. In 1963 he joined the missionary Congregation of the Most Holy Redeemer, because the Communist regime abolished the Greek-Catholic Church. He was professed on 8 November 1971 and was ordained a priest on 24 February 1974 by Archbishop Volodymyr Sterniuk, C.Ss.R. . After ordination he served in the clandestine parishes of the Western Ukraine.

In 11 October 1986 Fr. Sabryha was consecrated to the Episcopate as auxiliary bishop. The principal and single consecrator was clandestine Archbishop Volodymyr Sterniuk.

In 20 April 1993 he was elected as the first bishop of the new created Ukrainian Catholic Eparchy of Ternopil–Zboriv (until 21 July 2000 it was named as Eparchy of Ternopil).

He suddenly died on 29 June 2006.

Catholic Church titles
Preceded by new creation	Eparchial Bishop of Ternopil–Zboriv; 1993–2006	Succeeded by Vasyl Semeniuk
