= Holy Trinity Church, Zarvanytsia =

Church in Ternopil Oblast, Ukraine

Holy Trinity Church Церква Пресвятої Трійці
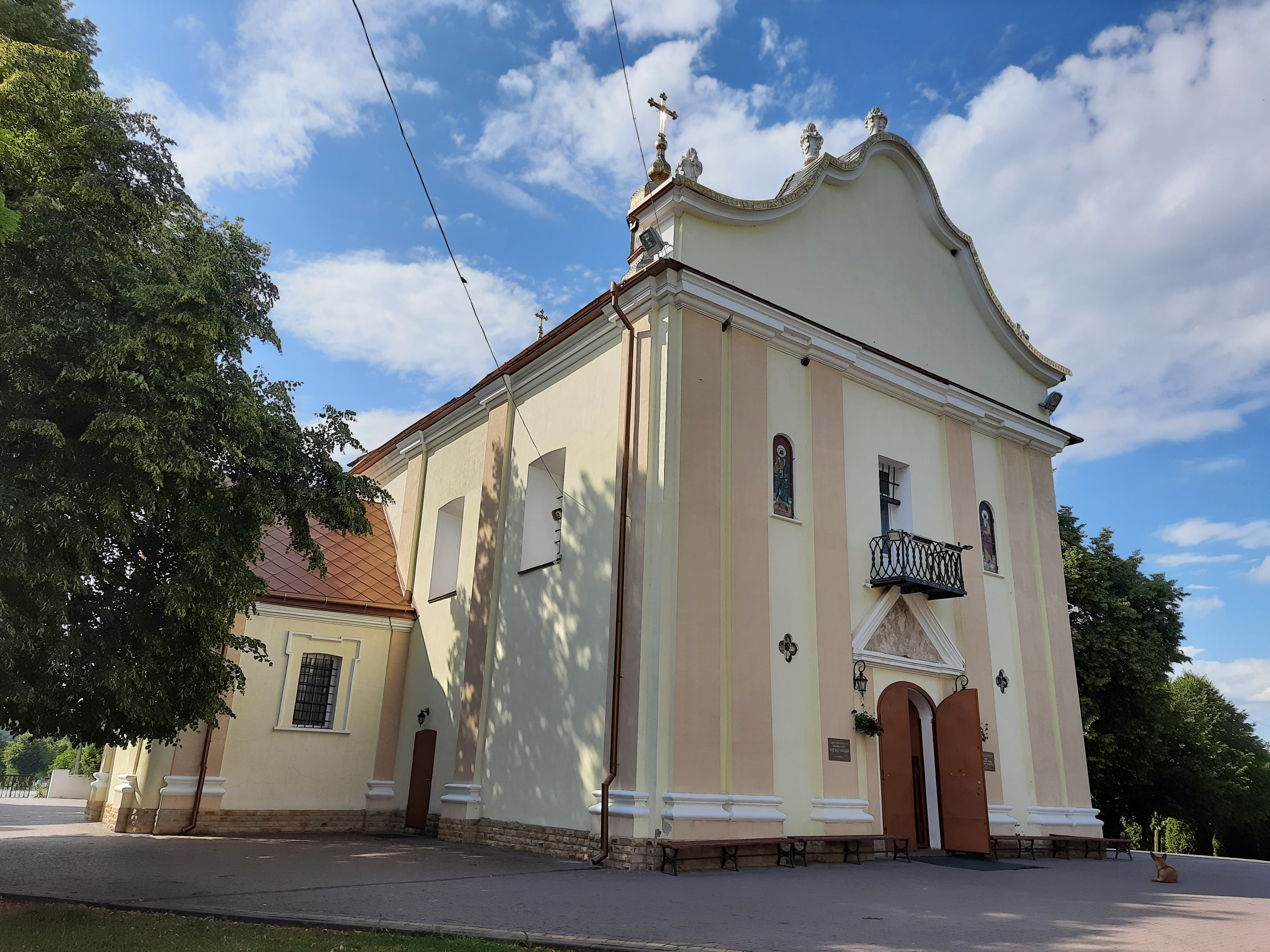

- Location within Ternopil Oblast

Religion
- Affiliation: Ukrainian Greek Catholic Church

Location
- Location: Zarvanytsia
- Interactive map of Holy Trinity Church; Церква Пресвятої Трійці
- Coordinates: 49°13′32″N 25°21′48″E

Church of the Holy Trinity in Zarvanytsia (Ukrainian: Церква Пресвятої Трійці) is a small, historical Greek Catholic Baroque church located in the village of Zarvanytsia, in the Ternopil Raion, Ternopil Oblast, Ukraine. The church houses the miraculous Theotokos of Zarvanytsia (also translated as the Miraculous Icon of the Zarvanytsia Mother of God). Currently, the parish in Zarvanytsia is part of the Zarvanytsia Deanery of the Ukrainian Catholic Archeparchy of Ternopil–Zboriv.

== History ==
The church was founded by Piotr Michał Miączyński, the Starosta of Krzepice and Voivode of Chernihiv, by an act dated 10 March 1747. Building work was carried out in the years 1747–1754. According to tradition, the church was constructed using stone from the castle in Polesiukhi, which had been destroyed by the Turks. The furnishings were created before 1759 and consisted of six altars and a pulpit. The interior was completely Latinized, featuring a Baroque altar with four columns. In 1784, the illusionistic polychromy (wall paintings) of the interior was executed by Andrzej Solecki from Krekhovychi.

On 26 June 1774, in the village of Sytne, the former Starosta of Kaniv, Mikołaj Bazyli Potocki, drew up his will, in which he bequeathed, among other things, 8,000 Polish złoty to the Church of the Holy Trinity in Zarvanytsia.

The church houses a historical pulpit dating from around 1774, which is adorned with figurative sculptures of the Four Evangelists, Christ on the Globe, the Dove (representing the Holy Spirit), and God the Father. The author of these carvings remains an unidentified representative of the Lviv school of Rococo sculpture. The presence of the Pilawa coat of arms on the canopy indicates that the founder may have been Mikołaj Bazyli Potocki of Buchach, and the pulpit itself was modeled after the one in Horodenka.

Next to the church there is a bell tower and a stone sculpture of the Virgin Mary.

In 1945, the church was partially destroyed by fire.

== Gallery ==
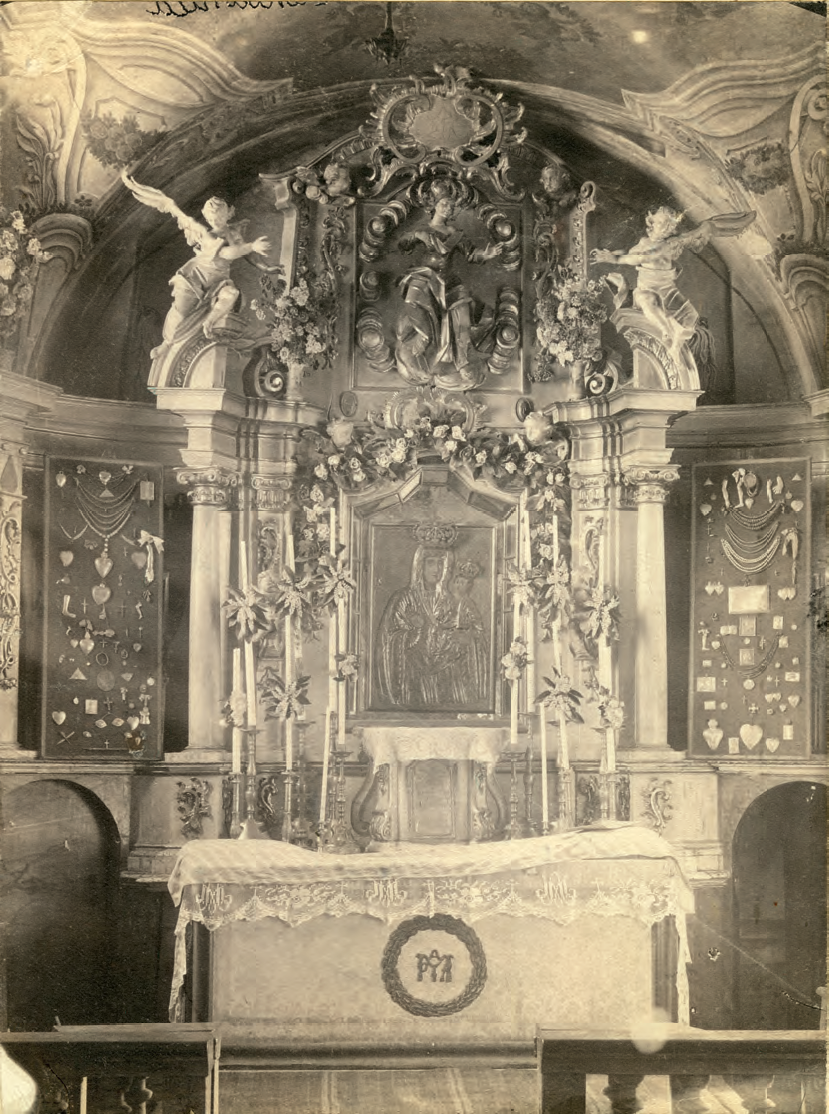
Altar with the miraculous Theotokos of Zarvanytsia before 1900

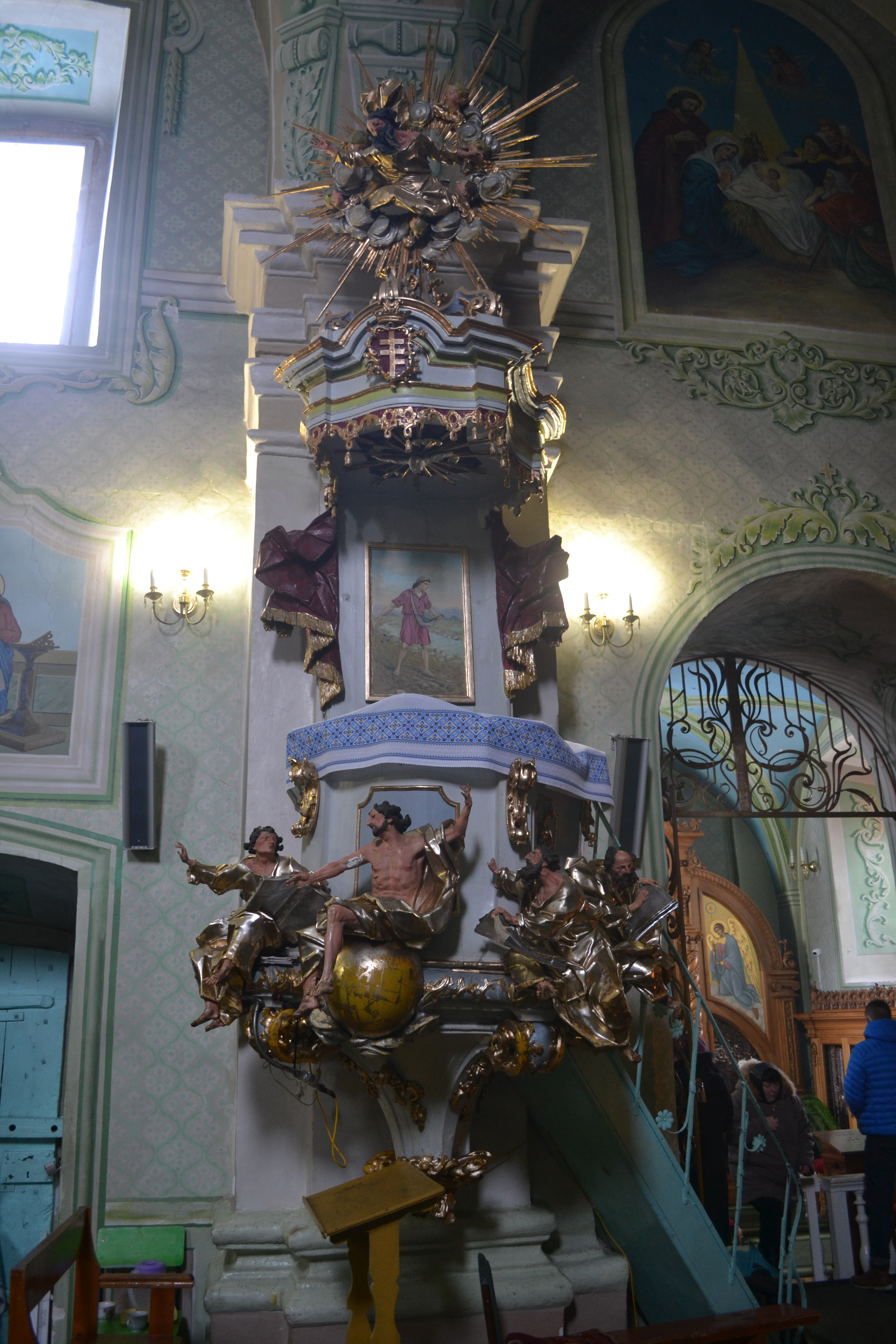
The Pulpit in the Church

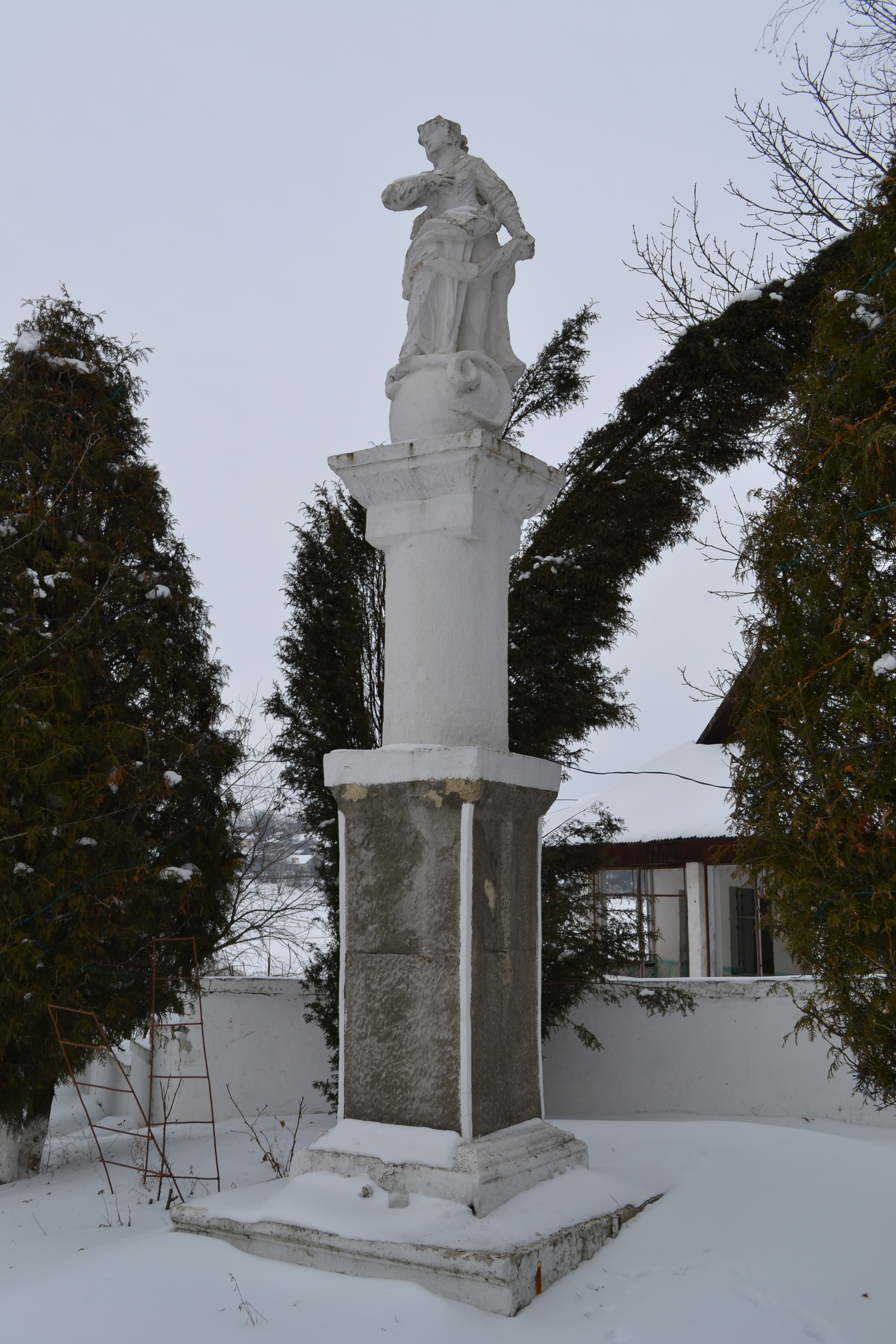
Statue Column beside the Church

== Bibliography ==
- Квич Л. М. З Історії Марійського духовного центру Зарваниця // Наукові записки Прикарпатського національного університету ім. Василя Стефаника. — Історичне релігієзнавство. — 2011. — Вип. 5. — С. 111—121.
- Grzegorz Rąkowski: Przewodnik krajoznawczo-historyczny po Ukrainie Zachodniej: Podole. Pruszków : Oficyna Wydawnicza "Rewasz", 2006, s. 254-257. ISBN 83-89188-46-5.
- W. Firman: Zarwanica. Tarnopol, 2008, 60 s.
