= Ivan Kulyk (bishop) =

Ukrainian Greek-Catholic bishop

- Eparchial Bishop of Ukrainian Catholic Eparchy of Kamyanets-Podilskyi
- Church: Ukrainian Greek Catholic Church
- Appointed: 10 September 2019
- Predecessor: Vasyl Semeniuk as Archiepiscopal Administrator
- Successor: Incumbent
- Other post: Parish priest of Santi Sergio e Bacco (2009–2019)

Orders
- Ordination: 8 May 2005 (Priest) by Vasyl Semeniuk
- Consecration: 1 December 2019 (Bishop) by Sviatoslav Shevchuk

Personal details
- Born: Ivan Mykhaylovych Kulyk; 16 March 1979 (age 47) Perevoloka, Ternopil Oblast, Ukrainian SSR

Bishop Ivan Kulyk (Ukrainian: Іван Кулик; born 16 March 1979) is a Ukrainian Greek Catholic hierarch as the first Eparchial Bishop of Kamyanets-Podilskyi since 10 September 2019.

== Life ==
Bishop Kulyk, was born in Perevoloka, Buchach Raion, Ternopil Oblast, Ukrainian SSR and after graduating from the school, joined the Major Theological Seminary in Ternopil in 1997 and then continued his studies at the Catholic University of Lublin in Poland. After returning to Ukraine, he was ordained as a priest on 8 May 2005 for the Ukrainian Catholic Eparchy of Ternopil, and during 2005–2009 he attended Patristic Institute Augustinianum in Rome, Italy, receiving a licentiate degree in patristic theology.

At the same time, while studying in Rome, from 2006–2009, he served as a parish priest in different Ukrainian Catholic communities in Italy and in 2009 was appointed as a parish priest of Santi Sergio e Bacco.

On 10 September 2019, his election by the Synod of Bishops of the Ukrainian Greek Catholic Church as the first eparchial bishop of Kamyanets-Podilskyi, Ukraine, was confirmed by Pope Francis. On 1 December 2019, he was consecrated as bishop by Major Archbishop Sviatoslav Shevchuk and other hierarchs of the Ukrainian Greek Catholic Church in the Nativity of Mary Cathedral in Khmelnytskyi.

Catholic Church titles
Preceded by Vasyl Semeniuk as Archiepiscopal Administrator	Eparchial Bishop of Ukrainian Catholic Eparchy of Kamyanets-Podilskyi; 2019–	Incumbent
