= Yustyn Boiko =

Ukrainian religious figure (born 1977)

- Secretary for Monastic Affairs of the Ukrainian Catholic Archeparchy of Lviv
- Church: Ukrainian Greek Catholic Church
- Appointed: 4 January 2018

Orders
- Ordination: 1 April 2001 (Priest) by Liubomyr Huzar

Personal details
- Born: Yurii Boiko; 26 May 1977 (age 49) Dora, Ivano-Frankivsk Oblast
- Denomination: Ukrainian Greek Catholic

Yustyn Boiko (Ukrainian: Юстин Бойко; secular name: Yurii Boiko, Ukrainian: Юрій Бойко; born 26 May 1977) is a Ukrainian religious figure, hieromonk-studite, writer, blogger. Doctor of Theology (2012).

== Biography ==
Yustyn (Yurii) Boiko was born on 26 May 1977 in Dora, which is now part of the city of Yaremche, Ivano-Frankivsk Oblast.

In 1994, he entered the monastery of monks of the Studite Order of the UGCC, where in 1998 he took eternal vows to God.

In 2000, he graduated from the Catholic University and the Higher Theological Seminary in Lublin, Poland.

On 1 April 2001, he was ordained a priest by His Beatitude Liubomyr Huzar.

In 2005, he graduated from the Augustinian Patristic Pontifical Institute of the Pontifical Lateran University; in 2005–2006, he studied for his doctorate there.

On 24 May 2012, he defended his doctoral dissertation at the Augustinian Patristic Pontifical Institute on the topic: "La figura di San Clemente Romano nella letteratura agiografica e liturgica manoscritta paleoslava" (supervised by Professor Yakiv Kulich). On 635 pages, Yustyn Boiko has published the most complete collection of Old Slavonic manuscripts (several documents are published for the first time) from the libraries of Ukraine, Greece, Russia, Italy, Croatia, Spain, the United States, and Poland, which are dedicated to Pope Clement IV. The international professors' committee gave the thesis the highest grade of "MAGNUM CUM LAUDE" with a recommendation to publish it in full.

Boiko was pastor of the Church of Saint Michael the Archangel in Lviv, administrator of the monastery of Saint Theodore Studite "Studion" (Castel Gandolfo, Italy), and prosecutor of the monasteries of the Studite Order at the Holy See.

Since 4 January 2018, he has been a synkel for monastic affairs of the Ukrainian Catholic Archeparchy of Lviv. Organizer of the annual pilgrimage to the Univ Lavra.

== Works ==
Boiko is the author of 300 articles on moral, ethical, spiritual, social and political topics; about 50 articles are devoted to the righteous Metropolitan Andrei and Blessed Klymentii Sheptytskyi's, the history of Studite monasticism in Ukraine.

In 2018, he presented the book Conversations with God over Coffee.

In 2019, while processing documents in the Central State Historical Archive (Lviv), he found an unpublished will of Metropolitan Andrei Sheptytskyi.
