= Cathedral of the Immaculate Conception of the Blessed Virgin Mary, Ternopil =

Cathedral in Ukraine

Cathedral of the Immaculate Conception of the Blessed Virgin Mary
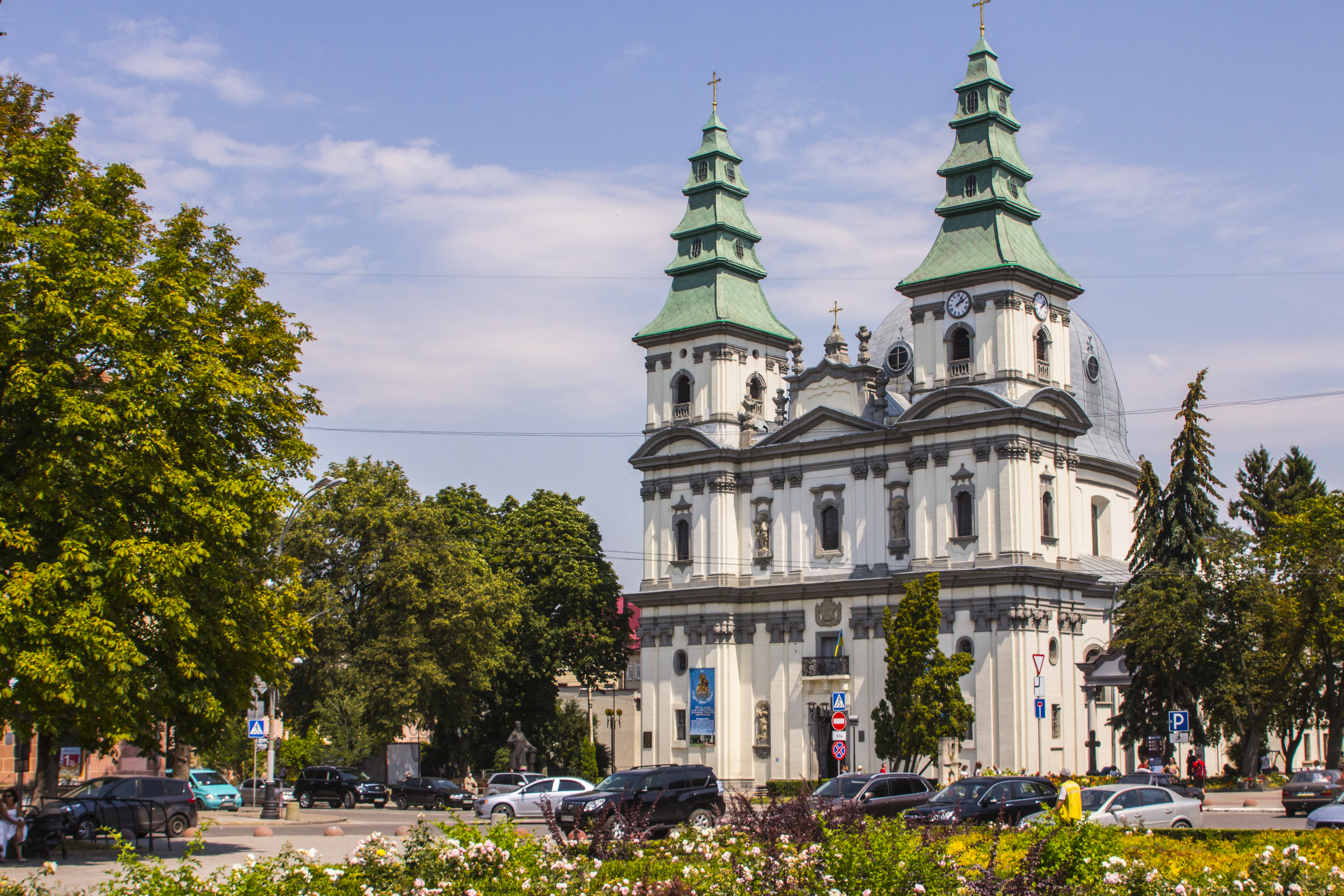

Religion
- Affiliation: Ukrainian Greek Catholic Church
- Status: Active

Location
- Location: Ternopil, Ukraine
- Interactive map of Cathedral of the Immaculate Conception of the Blessed Virgin Mary
- Coordinates: 49.5530°N 25.5915°E

Architecture
- Architect: August Moszyński
- Type: Cathedral
- Style: Baroque
- Groundbreaking: 1749
- Completed: 1779

Website
- http://katedraternopil.org/

Immovable Monument of National Significance of Ukraine
- Official name: Костел монастиря домініканців (мур.) (Church of the Dominican Monastery (stone))
- Type: Architecture
- Reference no.: 190030

Cathedral of the Immaculate Conception of the Blessed Virgin Mary, formerly Dominican Church, is a Ukrainian Greek Catholic Cathedral in Ternopil, Ukraine overseen by the Ternopil–Zboriv Archdiocese. Built in the middle of the 18th century in a Late-Baroque-style, the cathedral is one of the defining sights of the city of Ternopil.

== History ==
The church was designed by August Moszyński (for a long time it was mistakenly imputed to Jan de Witte). The interior was painted by Stanisław Stroiński, while the fresco of sideload naves by Józef Chojnicki. Sculptures were completed by Sebastian Fesinger. The construction of the Roman Catholic Church started in 1749, on the place where an Old Ruthenian church once used to stand, and finished thirty years later. The first name held by the cathedral was Roman Catholic Church of St. Vincent Ferrer.

As soon as the building was completed, then master of Ternopil, Polish magnate Józef Potocki handed the Church to the Dominican Order. They were annually paid 6,000 zlotys for the maintenance of the church. Soon, the monks adjoined a two-story cell building to the Catholic Church and turned the complex into Dominican monastery. A cozy Italian courtyard was built between the church and the cells. Today it is a separate, worthy of note sight.

In the first half of the 19th century, the church's building belonged to Jesuit monks who opened a Collegium on the monastic premises. However, the Dominican monks took the cloister back in 1903 and restored the fallen into decay Catholic Church. In particular, they built a new cupola, restored the original frescos and decorated the walls with new paintings, installed an organ and additional altars under the direction of the architect, Władysław Sadłowski.

On October 20–22, 1851, Emperor Franz Joseph I was in Ternopil in which a formal meeting was held in the Dominican Church of the city.

During World War II, the Dominican church – the same as the whole city – was severely damaged. It was fully restored a few years after war's end, though. During the Soviet times, the church's premises were used as a picture gallery, and only in 1989, the church started operating again. It passed to the Greek-Catholic community of Ternopil and was renamed the Cathedral of the Immaculate Conception of the Blessed Virgin Mary.

== The present time ==
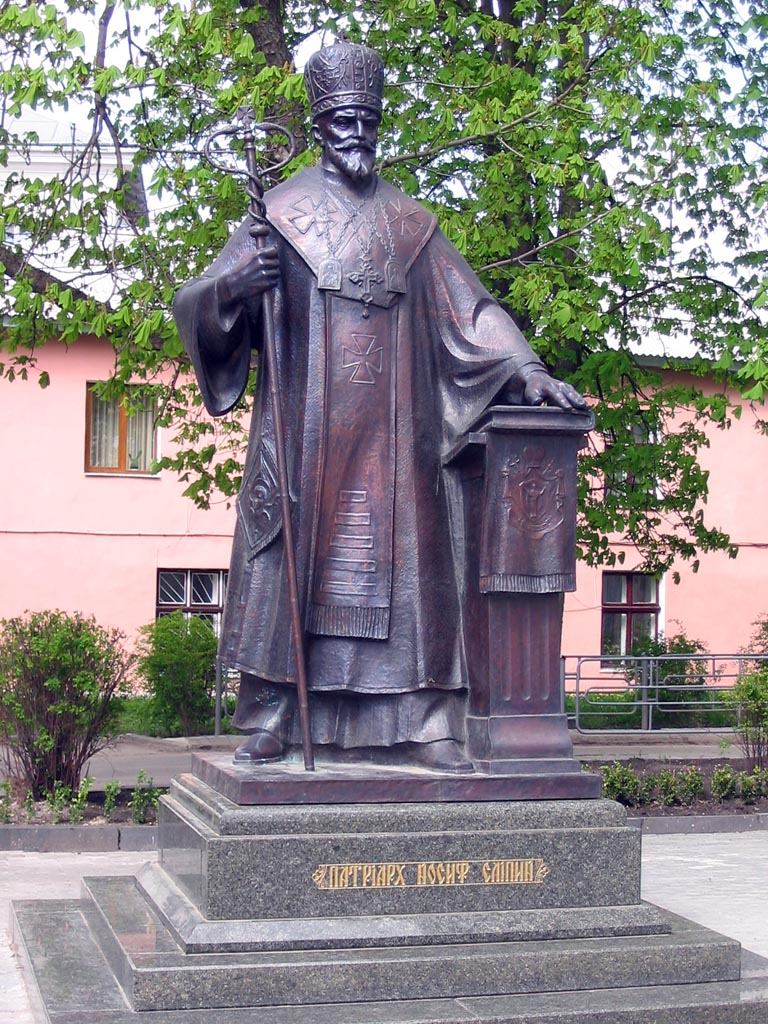
Statue of Josyf Slipyj

The church had 9 altars: central, St. Vintsetiy and lateral. Now, instead of lateral, it is possible to see the copies of wonder-working icons of Ternopil regions: Zarvanytsia, Pochaiv, Terebovlia and Ternopil. State Archives of Ternopil Oblast are located in the monastery.

A park is laid out in front of the Catholic Church and a monument to the Prince Danylo Halytskyi is installed there. To the left of the church, a monument to Josyf Slipyj was dedicated in 2004.

== See also ==
- List of Jesuit sites
- Ukrainian Greek Catholic Church
- Ukrainian Catholic Archeparchy of Ternopil–Zboriv
