= Ukrainian Catholic Eparchy of Kamyanets-Podilskyi =

Ukrainian Greek Catholic eparchy in Ukraine

Eparchy of Kamyanets-Podilskyi Eparchia Camenecensis Ucrainorum Українська Греко-Католицька Кам'янець-Подільська Єпархія

Location
- Territory: Khmelnytskyi Oblast
- Ecclesiastical province: Archeparchy of Ternopil–Zboriv
- Headquarters: Khmelnytskyi, Ukraine

Statistics
- Area: 20,645 km^{2} (7,971 sq mi)
- Population: Total; Catholics: (as of 2016); 1,298,304; 20,000 (1,54%)
- Parishes: 75

Information
- Sui iuris church: Ukrainian Greek Catholic
- Rite: Byzantine
- Established: 11 December 2015
- Cathedral: Nativity of Mary Cathedral in Khmelnytskyi

Current leadership
- Pope: Francis
- Major Archbishop: Major Archbishop Sviatoslav Shevchuk
- Bishop: Ivan Kulyk
- Metropolitan Archbishop: Vasyl Semeniuk Metropolitan of the Ukrainian Catholic Archeparchy of Ternopil–Zboriv

Map

The Ukrainian Catholic Eparchy of Kamyanets-Podilskyi is an eparchy (Eastern Catholic diocese) of the Ukrainian Greek Catholic Church sui iuris (Byzantine Rite in Ukrainian language) in its homeland Ukraine.

The eparchy is suffragan of the Metropolitan Ukrainian Catholic Archeparchy of Ternopil–Zboriv.

== History ==
- Established as Eparchy of Kamyanets
- United on 6 December 2004 with its Metropolitan, as title of the Major Archdiocese of Kyiv–Halyč.
- Restored on 11 December 2015 as Eparchy of Kamyanets-Podilskyi, on territory returned from the Ukrainian Catholic Archeparchy of Ternopil–Zboriv, as its suffragan.

== Episcopal ordinaries ==
(all Ukrainian Rite)

Eparchs (Bishops) of Kamianets (unavailable)

Eparchial Bishops of Kamianets-Podilskyi

- Archiepiscopal Administrator (11 December 2015 – 10 September 2019) Vasyl Semeniuk Metropolitan of Ternopil – Zboriv
- (since 10 September 2019) Ivan Kulyk
