= Perevoloka =

Perevoloka Переволока
- Village
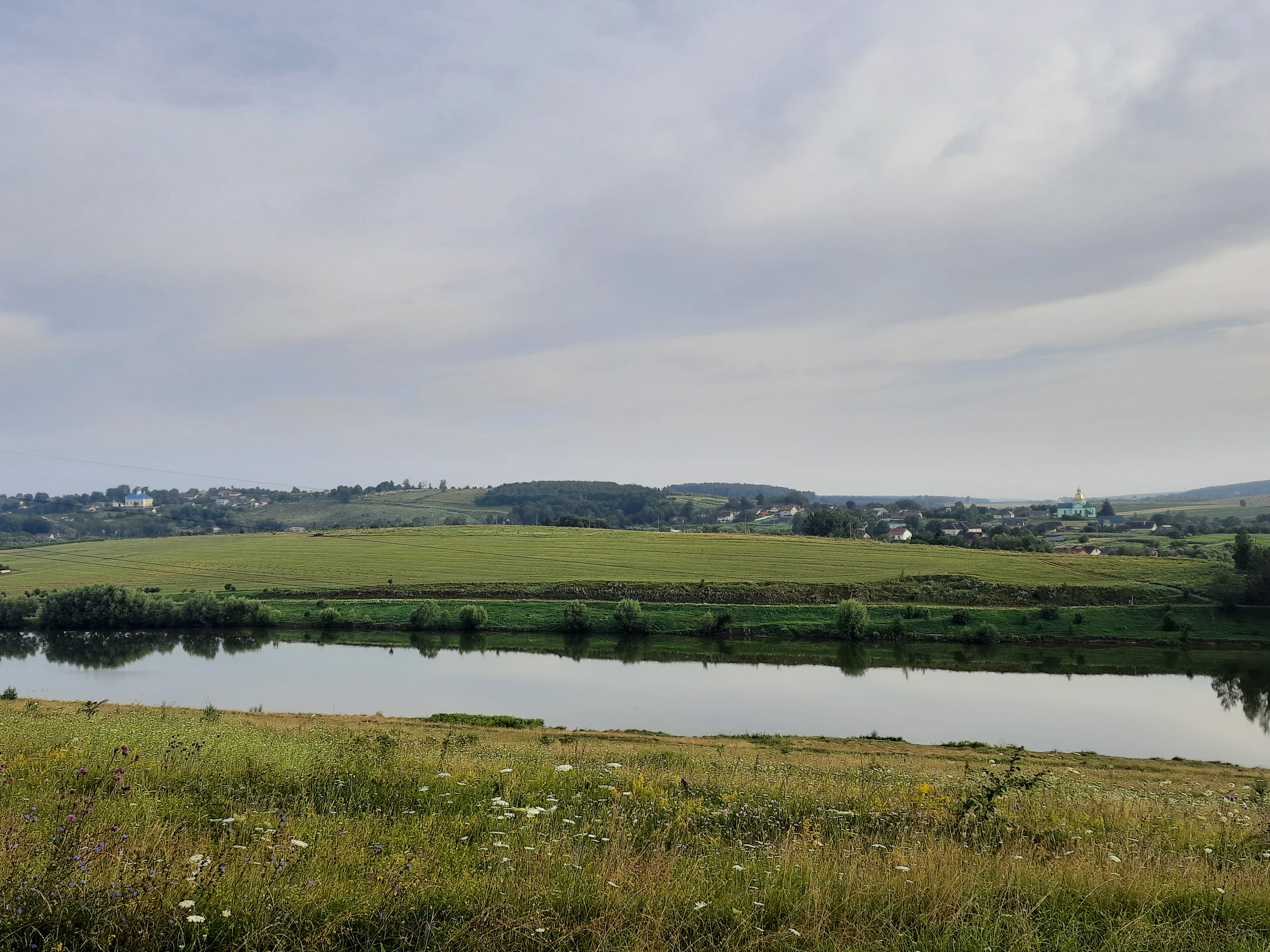

- Location within Ternopil Oblast
- Coordinates: 49°07′01″N 25°21′02″E
- Country: Ukraine
- Oblast: Ternopil Oblast
- District: Chortkiv Raion
- Established: 1467

Area
  - Total: 7.856 km^{2} (3.033 sq mi)
- Elevation: 293 m (961 ft)

Population
  - Total: 2 368
  - Density: 301.43/km^{2} (780.7/sq mi)
- Time zone: UTC+2 (EET)
  - Summer (DST): UTC+3 (EEST)
- Postal code: 48420
- Area code: +380 3544
- Website: село Переволока (in Ukrainian)

Perevoloka (Ukrainian: Переволо́ка) — village (selo) in Chortkiv Raion, Ternopil Oblast, of western Ukraine. It belongs to Buchach urban hromada, one of the hromadas of Ukraine. The word literally means "portage place".

The population of the village is about 2 368 people and local government is administered by Perevolotska village council.

== Geography ==
The village is located on the banks of the Strypa River and is situated at an altitude of 293 metres (960 ft) above sea level.
Perevoloka village is one of the largest villages in the district Buchach (Buchach Raion) and is located at a distance 62 kilometres (39 mi) from the regional center Ternopil, and 9 kilometres (5.6 mi) from the district center Buchach.

== History and attractions ==
The date of establishment the village is considered 1467, though the first written record dates from the 1379. Near the village found archeological sights of Cucuteni-Trypillian culture and Culture of ancient Rus. In the ancient book Nestor chronik from 1113 there is a note of a city named Perevoloka that was sacked in the year 1092. The Nestor chronik is all about the culture of ancient Rus.
The village has a St. George Church (1895, stone), St. Trinity Church (1934, stone) and St. Josaphat Church.

Until 18 July 2020, Perevoloka belonged to Buchach Raion. The raion was abolished in July 2020 as part of the administrative reform of Ukraine, which reduced the number of raions of Ternopil Oblast to three. The area of Buchach Raion was merged into Chortkiv Raion.

== Notable persons ==
- Ivan Kulyk, Bishop of the Ukrainian Greek-Catholic church
