= Diocese of Castra Severiana =

Roman Catholic titular see

The Diocese of Castra Severiana (Latin: Dioecesis Castraseverianensis) is a suppressed and titular See of the Roman Catholic Church.

== History ==
Castra Severiana, probably located near Altava, or Ouled Mimoun in Algeria, is an ancient episcopal seat of the Roman province of Mauretania Caesariensis.

The only bishop known of this African diocese is Fausto, whose name appears in 73rd place on the list of bishops of Mauritania Cesariensis called to Carthage by the Vandal king Huneric in 484; Fausto, as all the other African Catholic bishops, was exiled.

From 1933 Castra Severiana is a titular See of the Roman Catholic Church.

== Bishops ==
- Natal † (cited in 484)

=== Titular bishops ===
- Giuseppe Maritano, P.I.M.E. † (29 December 1965 – 26 May 1978 dimesso)
- Paul Dacoury-Tabley (9 April 1979 – 19 December 1994)
- Evarist Pinto (17 February 2000 – 5 January 2004)
- Vasyl Semeniuk (10 February 2004 – 19 October 2006)
- Pedro María Laxague (14 November 2006 – 3 November 2015)
- Giorgio Marengo I.M.C., from 2 April 2020

== Bibliography ==
- Pius Bonifacius Gams, Series episcoporum Ecclesiae Catholicae, Leipzig, 1931, p. 465
- Stefano Antonio Morcelli, Africa christiana, Volume I, Brescia, 1816, p. 130
- Anatole Toulotte, Géographie de l'Afrique chrétienne. Maurétanies, Montreuil-sur-mer, 1894, pp. 69–71
- Joseph Mesnage, L'Afrique chrétienne, Paris, 1912, p. 481
- André Mandouze, Prosopographie chrétienne du Bas-Empire, 1. Prosopographie de l'Afrique chrétienne (303–533), Paris, Éditions du Centre National de la Recherche Scientifique, 1982
