= Dora, Nadvirna Raion, Ivano-Frankivsk Oblast =

Dora Дора
- Location in Ivano-Frankivsk Oblast Dora (Ukraine)
- Coordinates: 48°28′53″N 24°35′13″E
- Country: Ukraine
- Oblast: Ivano-Frankivsk Oblast
- Raion: Nadvirna Raion
- Time zone: UTC+2 (EET)
  - Summer (DST): UTC+3 (EEST)
- Postal code: 78500

Dora (Ukrainian: Дора, Polish: Dora) former village in Ukraine, now — part of the city of Yaremche, Nadvirna Raion, Ivano-Frankivsk Oblast, Ukraine.

== History ==
Until the end of 1952, the villagers resisted the Moscow occupiers with arms in their hands.

== Religion ==
- Church of John the Baptist (1844, wooden, UGCC)

== Notable residents ==
- Yustyn Boiko (born 1977), Ukrainian religious figure, studious hieromonk, writer, blogger, Doctor of Theology (2012)
- Stepan Hanushevskyi (1917—1996), Ukrainian bandura player
- Vasyl Baiurak (1722—1754), leader of the uprising in 1745–1754, supporter of Oleksa Dovbush
- Vasyl Ivasiuk (born 1960), ruling bishop of the Kolomyia Eparchy of the UGCC
- Teodor Martyniuk (born 1974), Auxiliary Bishop of Ternopil-Zboriv of the UGCC
- Mykhailo Kosylo (1932—2000), Ukrainian Greek Catholic priest, Soviet political prisoner, rector of the underground seminary of the Ukrainian Greek Catholic Church, Vicar General of Bukovyna
- Vasyl Semeniuk (born 1949), Archbishop and Metropolitan of Ternopil-Zboriv of the UGCC. Master of Theology (1997).
- Blessed Martyr Anthonii Kaznovskyi (1878—1959), priest of the UGCC, a public figure, repressed, and died in a Soviet prison
