= Dmytro Hryhorak =

Ukrainian Greek Catholic bishop (born 1956)

Dmytro Hryhorak, O.S.B.M.
- Eparchial Bishop of Ukrainian Catholic Eparchy of Buchach
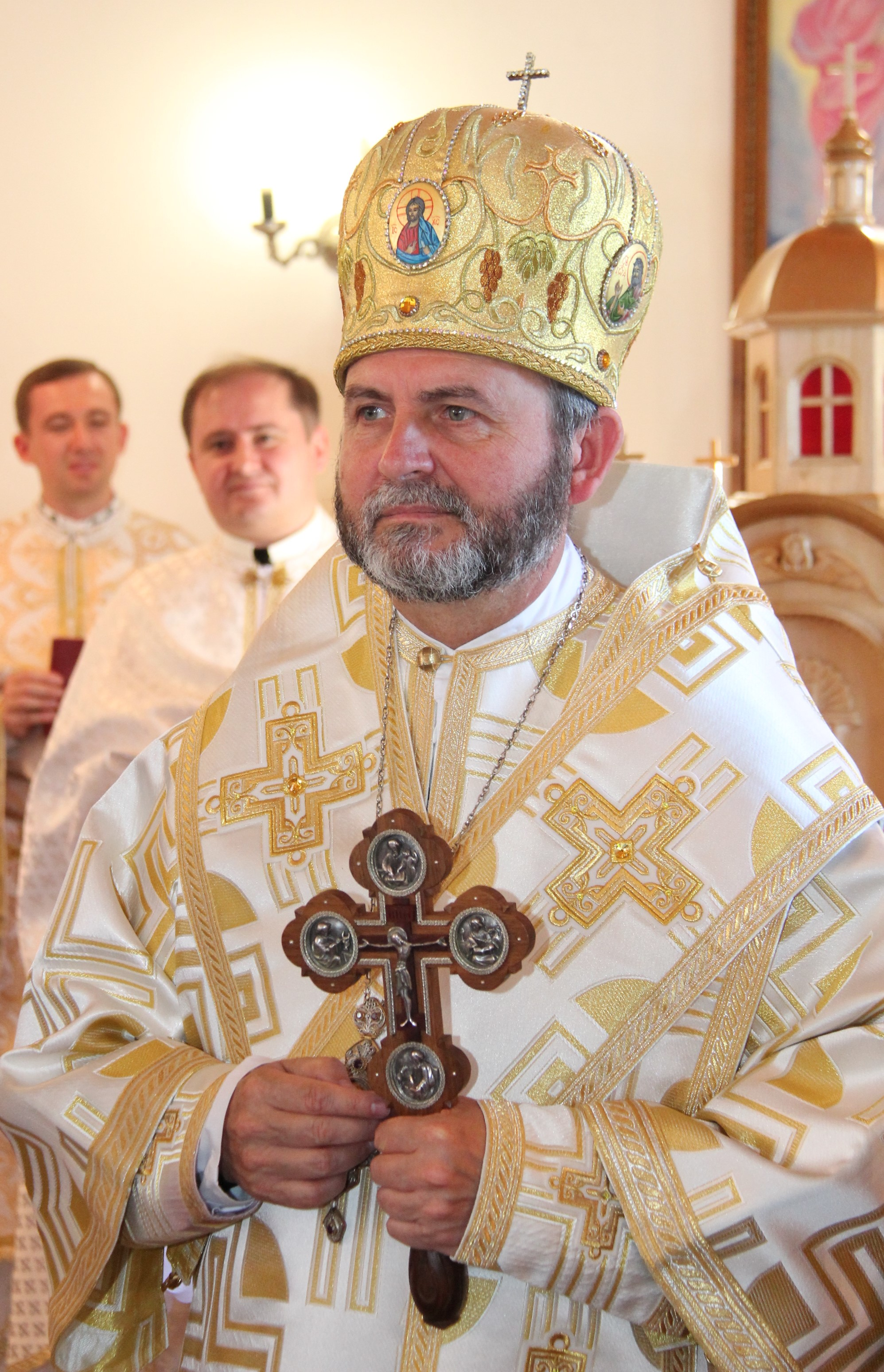
- Church: Ukrainian Greek Catholic Church
- Appointed: 28 July 2007 (as Apostolic Administrator); 23 July 2011 (as Eparchial Bishop)
- Predecessor: Iryney Bilyk

Orders
- Ordination: 25 Oct 1992 (Priest) by Sofron Dmyterko
- Consecration: 28 Sep 2011 (Bishop) by Sviatoslav Shevchuk

Personal details
- Born: Bohdan Dmytrovych Hryhorak; 1 January 1956 (age 70) Stanislaviv, Ukrainian SSR

Bishop Dmytro Bohdan Hryhorak, O.S.B.M. (Ukrainian: Дмитро Богдан Григорак; born 1 January 1956) is a Ukrainian Greek Catholic hierarch as an Eparchial Bishop of Buchach since 23 July 2011. Previously he served as an Apostolic Administrator of the same Eparchy from 28 July 2007 until 21 July 2011.

Coat of arms of Bishop Dmytro Hryhorak

== Life ==
Bishop Hryhorak was born to clandestine Greek-Catholics Dmytro and Mariya (née Prypkhan) Hryhorak. He graduated Oil and Gas Institute in Ivano-Frankivsk (1973–1978) with a diploma in mechanical engineering. Then he worked as design engineer, until joined the Order of Saint Basil the Great in 1989; he had a profession on 14 October 1989 and a solemn profession on 2 February 1997. But before his solemn profession he was ordained as priest on 25 October 1992, while studied in the Theological Academy in Ivano-Frankivsk. Then he continued his studies in the Catholic University of Lublin in Poland with magister degree in Ecclesiology.

During 1992–2007 he served in the different Basilian monasteries as priest, superior, missionary and chaplain.

After the resignation oh the first Eparchial Bishop of Ukrainian Catholic Eparchy of Buchach, on 28 July 2007 Fr. Dmytro Hryhorak was appointed by the Pope Benedict XVI as an Apostolic Administrator "ad nutum Sanctae Sedis" and 4 years later, in July 2011, he was elected the second Eparchial Bishop of the Eparchy of Buchach. On 28 September 2011 he was consecrated as bishop by Major Archbishop Sviatoslav Shevchuk and other hierarchs of the Ukrainian Greek Catholic Church.

Catholic Church titles
Preceded by Iryney Bilyk	Apostolic Administrator of the Eparchy of Buchach; 2007–2011	Succeeded by himself as Eparchial Bishop
Preceded by himself as Apostolic Administrator	Bishop of Buchach; 2011–present	Succeeded by Incumbent
