= Castra Severiana =

Ancient Roman-era town in North Africa

Castra Severiana was an ancient Roman-era town of the Roman province of Mauretania Caesariensis, in North Africa during late antiquity.

The town in modern Algeria has been tentatively identified with ruins at Sidi-Ali-Ben-Joub (Chanzy) or Lalla Marnia.

Roman Empire – Mauretania Caesariensis (125 AD)

== History ==
=== Roman Empire ===
During the Roman Empire Castra Severiana was a Roman town, of the Roman province of Mauretania Caesariensis.

The town was excavated in the 1940s.

=== Late antiquity ===
From inscriptions we know that Castra Severiana was part of the small Kingdom of Altava, a Christian–Berber kingdom that existed around Tamazgha from the 4th century AD until the Muslim conquest of the Maghreb.

== Ecclesiastical history ==
The town was also the cathedra of the diocese of Castra Severiana, an ancient Christian bishopric in the papal sway, that flourished in late antiquity

Its only historically documented bishop was Faustus, mentioned in 484.

It did not last long after the seventh century Muslim conquest of the Maghreb.

=== Titular see ===
The diocese was nominally restored in 1933 as Latin titular bishopric of Castra Severiana (Latin = Curiate Italian) / Castraseverianensis (Latin adjective) and titular see of the Roman Catholic Church.

It is vacant, having had the following incumbents, do far of the fitting episcopal (lowest) rank:

- José Maritano, Pontifical Institute for Foreign Missions (P.I.M.E.) (1965.12.29 – 1978.05.26) as last Bishop-Prelate of Territorial Prelature of Macapá (Brazil) (1965.12.29 – 1980.10.30); next (see promoted) first Bishop of Macapá (Brazil) (1980.10.30 – retired 1983.08.31), died 1992
- Paul Dacoury-Tabley (1979.04.09 – 1994.12.19) as Auxiliary Bishop of Archdiocese of Abidjan (Ivory Coast) (1979.04.09 – 1994.12.19), Bishop of Grand-Bassam (Côte d'Ivoire) (1994.12.19 – retired 2010.03.27)
- Evarist Pinto (2000.02.17 – 2004.01.05) (born India) as Auxiliary Bishop of Archdiocese of Karachi (Pakistan) (2000.02.17 – 2004.01.05) and Apostolic Administrator of Karachi (2002.11.20 – 2004.01.05); next Metropolitan Archbishop of Karachi (2004.01.05 – retired 2012.01.25)
- Vasyl Semeniuk (2004.02.10 – 2006.10.19) as Auxiliary Bishop of Ternopil–Zboriv of the Ukrainians (Ukraine) (2004.02.10 – 2006.10.19), also Patriarchal Administrator of eparchy Kamyanets-Podilsky of the Ukrainians (Ukraine) (2015.12.11 – ...); next 'last' Eparch (Bishop) of Ternopil–Zboriv of the Ukrainians (2006.10.19 – 2011.12.22), (see) promoted first Metropolitan Archbishop of Ternopil–Zboriv of the Ukrainians (2011.12.22 – ...)
- Pedro María Laxague (2006.11.14 – 2015.11.03) as Auxiliary Bishop of Archdiocese of Bahía Blanca (Argentina) (2006.11.14 – 2015.11.03); next Bishop of Zárate-Campana (Argentina) (2015.11.03 – ...).
- Giorgio Marengo I.M.C., from 2 April 2020

== See also ==
- List of Catholic dioceses in Algeria

== Sources and external links ==
- GCatholic

Bibliography – ecclesiastical history

- Pius Bonifacius Gams, Series episcoporum Ecclesiae Catholicae, Leipzig 1931, p. 465
- Stefano Antonio Morcelli, Africa christiana, Volume I, Brescia 1816, p. 130
