= Zarvanytsia =

Zarvanytsia Зарваниця
- Location within Ukraine Location within Ternopil Oblast
- Coordinates: 49°13′08″N 25°22′09″E
- Country: Ukraine
- Oblast: Ternopil Oblast
- Raion: Ternopil Raion

Area
  - Total: 2.266 km^{2} (0.875 sq mi)

Population (2017)
  - Total: 285
  - Density: 150.93/km^{2} (390.9/sq mi)
- Time zone: UTC+2 (EET)
  - Summer (DST): UTC+3 (EEST)
- Postal code: 48142-48143
- Area code: +380 3551

Zarvanytsia (Ukrainian: Зарваниця) is a small village in the Eparchy of Ternopil-Zboriv. It has just over 300 citizens and is located in Ternopil Raion of Ternopil Oblast in western Ukraine, about 20 km (12 mi) SW from Terebovlia, 22 km (14 mi) N of Buchach and 18 km (11 mi) SE of Pidhaitsi, within an oxbow loop of the Strypa River. Zarvanytsia belongs to Zolotnyky rural hromada, one of the hromadas of Ukraine. The village is known for its icon of the Mother of God, reputed to work miracles, and is a popular site of pilgrimage, attracting Ukrainians both from the country as well as the diaspora scattered around the world.

== History ==
The history of the village and the icon dates back to the 13th century. In 1240, a monk fled the Ukrainian capital of Kyiv, which was devastated by a Mongol invasion, and stopped in a secluded valley to drink water from a spring and pray to the Blessed Virgin. Having done so, and exhausted by the long travel, he fell asleep and saw the Mother of God. After awakening completely rejuvenated, he found the icon and decided to stay there and build a chapel by the spring to house the icon. News of the miraculous icon spread among the local population and reached the gravely sick duke of Terebovlia Vasylko (brother of the only Ukrainian king Danylo of Halych). The duke ordered the icon to be brought to him but when the monk refused, he himself traveled to Zarvanytsia and prayed in front of the icon and was cured. Out of gratitude, he founded a church and monastery there.

The first written mention of the settlement dates to 1458. Ruins of fortifications from around that time can still be found in the village. During the years 1662–1688, the village was plundered by Turks and the church was burned down but the icon was saved and placed in a newly built church. In 1740 another icon, of the Crucified Christ, was also placed in Zarvaytisa, and two years later crowned by Metropolitan Athanasius Sheptytsky.

In 1754 the fourth church, this time out of stone, was built to replace a wooden one which was destroyed in a fire. The site of the wooden church is marked by a stone cross. This church, dedicated to the Holy Trinity still stands today.

In 1867 Pope Pius IX granted Zarvanytsia the status of a sanctuary and the icon of the Mother of God was crowned, thanks to the efforts of local priest Fr Porfiriy Mandyczewsky.

In 1916, during World War I, the village and the monastery were badly damaged, but they were rebuilt six years later with the help of Metropolitan Andrew Sheptytsky who personally visited Zarvanytsia. Joseph Slipyj, the future leader of the Ukrainian Greek Catholic Church, also frequently visited the shrine.

The greatest cataclysm came upon Zarvanytsia with the advent of Soviet rule. The monastery was burned to the ground along with its church, the parochial church of the Holy Trinity was closed and turned into a warehouse, the miraculous spring surrounded with barbed wire and turned into a dump. During major holy days, the entire village was blocked by the militia. In 1946, the entire Ukrainian Greek Catholic Church was officially banned by the Communists and made subject to the Moscow Patriarchate. Despite this, the Catacomb Church continued to function here, with the icons safely hidden and Divine Liturgy celebrated in private houses or the surrounding forests and even a secret seminary opened in 1975. With the imminent collapse of the Soviet Union on 17 July 1988, over 10,000 faithful gathered in Zarvanytsia to commemorate the millennium of Christianity in Ukraine, celebrated by Bishop Pavlo Vasylyk. On 23 November 1989, the Divine Liturgy could for the first time in half a century be celebrated in the church of the Holy Trinity. In 1991, the year Ukraine regained independence, the church was repaired and the chapel at the spring was rebuilt, as was the monastery of the Studite Brethren with its church of the Nativity of the Mother of God.

In 1991 the shrine was visited by Myroslav Ivan Lubachivsky, the head of the Ukrainian Church, and in 1993 by archbishop Volodymyr Sterniuk, locum tenens of the Church in Ukraine in the years 1972–1991. In April 1995, mass celebrations were held commending the Ukrainian nation to the protection of the Mother of God, renewing the vows of Yaroslav the Wise made in 1037, and in 1996 celebrating the 400th anniversary of the restoration of communion with the Catholic Church in the Union of Brest. In July 1997, the beginning of the Ukrainian preparations for the Great Jubilee was officially announced here and in 1999, Ukrainian martyrs of the 20th century were commemorated. In 2000, Cardinal Lubomyr Husar celebrated the first Divine Liturgy in the newly built sobor of the Mother of God of Zarvanytsia. During the pilgrimage of Pope John Paul II to Ukraine in 2001, he prayed before the icon of the Mother of God of Zarvanytsia in the church of St. Nicholas the Miracle Worker on Askoldova Mohyla in Kyiv. In 2002 the Patriarchal Council of the Ukrainian Church was concluded in Zarvanytsia gathering Church delegates from around the world. In 2003, an ecumenical pilgrimage by the Orthodox Brotherhood of St. Andrew the First-Called Apostle was held. In August 2004, Zarvanytsia hosted an international pilgrimage of reconciliation between Poles and Ukrainians, led by Cardinal Husar and the Primate of Poland, Cardinal Joseph Glemp, together with fifteen bishops from both nations.

The new church, largest in the Podolia and visible far outside the village and well inscribed into the landscape, has a single nave Byzantine cross-dome plan with five cupolas representing Christ and the four Evangelists. Along with the gates, the church of Annunciation, bell tower and chapels it has been built largely by donations from the Ukrainian diaspora as the country's economic situation is still ravaged by extreme poverty.

Along with the Holy Dormition Lavra in Univ and the monastery of the Basilian Fathers in Krekhiv, Zarvanytsia is one of the most important pilgrimage sites in Ukraine. It is the destination of an annual youth pilgrimage and numerous eparchial pilgrimages from the farthest corners of Ukraine and Ukrainian parishes abroad and even some Latin rite faithful from neighboring countries such as Poland and Slovakia.

Until 18 July 2020, Zarvanytsia belonged to Terebovlia Raion. The raion was abolished in July 2020 as part of the administrative reform of Ukraine, which reduced the number of raions of Ternopil Oblast to three. The area of Terebovlia Raion was merged into Ternopil Raion.
