= Iryney Bilyk =

Ukrainian Greek Catholic bishop (born 1950)

Iryney Bilyk, O.S.B.M.
- Bishop emeritus of Buchach
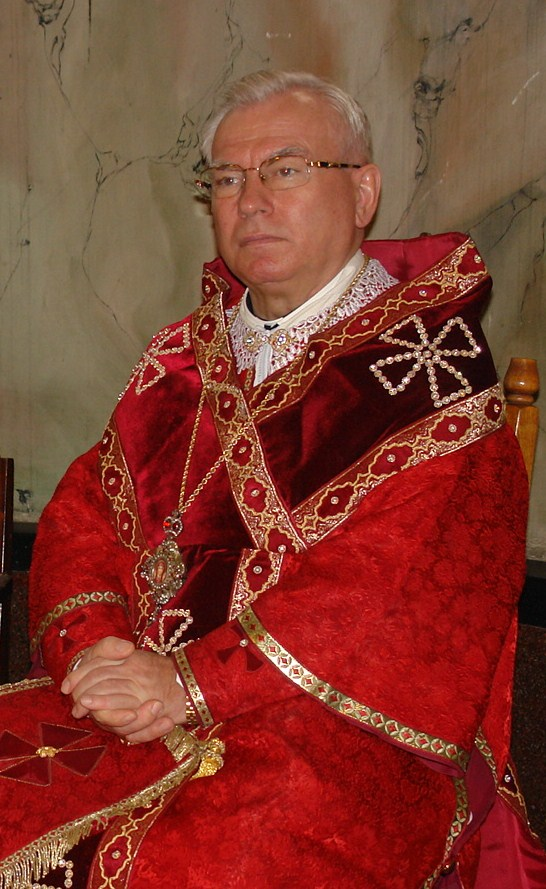
- Church: Ukrainian Greek Catholic Church
- Appointed: 21 July 2000
- Term ended: 28 July 2007
- Predecessor: new title
- Successor: Dmytro Hryhorak
- Other posts: Auxiliary Bishop of Ivano-Frankivsk (1989–2000); Titular Bishop of Novae (1991–2000)

Orders
- Ordination: 14 October 1978 (Priest) by Sofron Dmyterko
- Consecration: 15 August 1989 (Bishop) by Sofron Dmyterko

Personal details
- Born: Ihor Ivanovych Bilyk; 2 January 1950 (age 76) Knyazhpil, Drohobych Oblast, Ukrainian SSR (now Lviv Oblast, Ukraine)

Bishop Iryney Ihor Bilyk, O.S.B.M. (Ukrainian: Іриней Ігор Білик; born 2 January 1950) is a Ukrainian Greek Catholic hierarch. He served as Auxiliary Bishop of Ukrainian Catholic Eparchy of Ivano-Frankivsk from 15 August 1989 until 21 July 2000 (from 16 January 1991 as Titular Bishop of Novae), as an Eparchial Bishop of Buchach since from 21 July 2000 until 27 July 2007 and as Canon of Basilica di Santa Maria Maggiore since 27 July 2007.

== Life ==
Bishop Bilyk was born in the family of clandestine Greek-Catholics Ivan and Anna (née Krentiv) Bilyk. After graduating from school education, he three times joined different universities, but two times was excluded, because of religion persecutions. Finally, after a compulsory service in the Soviet Army, he graduated Faculty of Physics in Taras Shevchenko National University of Kyiv in 1977. Then he worked almost ten years in the Soviet North Caucasus in Kabardino-Balkar ASSR.

During all this time he was clandestine member of the Order of Saint Basil the Great, where he had a profession in October 1967 and a solemn profession on 13 October 1978. Bilyk was ordained as priest on 14 October 1978, after completing clandestine theological studies. Then he continued his studies, after liberty of the Ukrainian Catholics in the Pontifical University of St. Thomas Aquinas in Rome.

He served as priest clandestinely in time of persecution and after this, during 1990–1994 was the Rector of the new-revived Theological Academy in Ivano-Frankivsk.

On 15 August 1989 Fr. Bilyk was consecrated to the Episcopate as auxiliary bishop. His consecration was the last one in the "Catacomb Church", before Dissolution of the Soviet Union. The principal and consecrator was clandestine bishop Sofron Dmyterko. On 16 January 1991 this consecration, among other clandestine consecrations, was confirmed by John Paul II with appointment as Titular Bishop of Novae.

Catholic Church titles
New title	Bishop of Buchach; 2000–2007	Succeeded by Dmytro Hryhorak (as Apostolic Administrator)
