= Ukrainian Catholic Archeparchy of Ternopil–Zboriv =

Ukrainian Greek Catholic archeparchy in Ukraine

Coordinates: 49.5667°N 25.6000°E

Archeparchy of Ternopil – Zboriv Archieparchia Ternopoliensis-Zborovensis Тернопільсько-Зборівська Архиєпархія
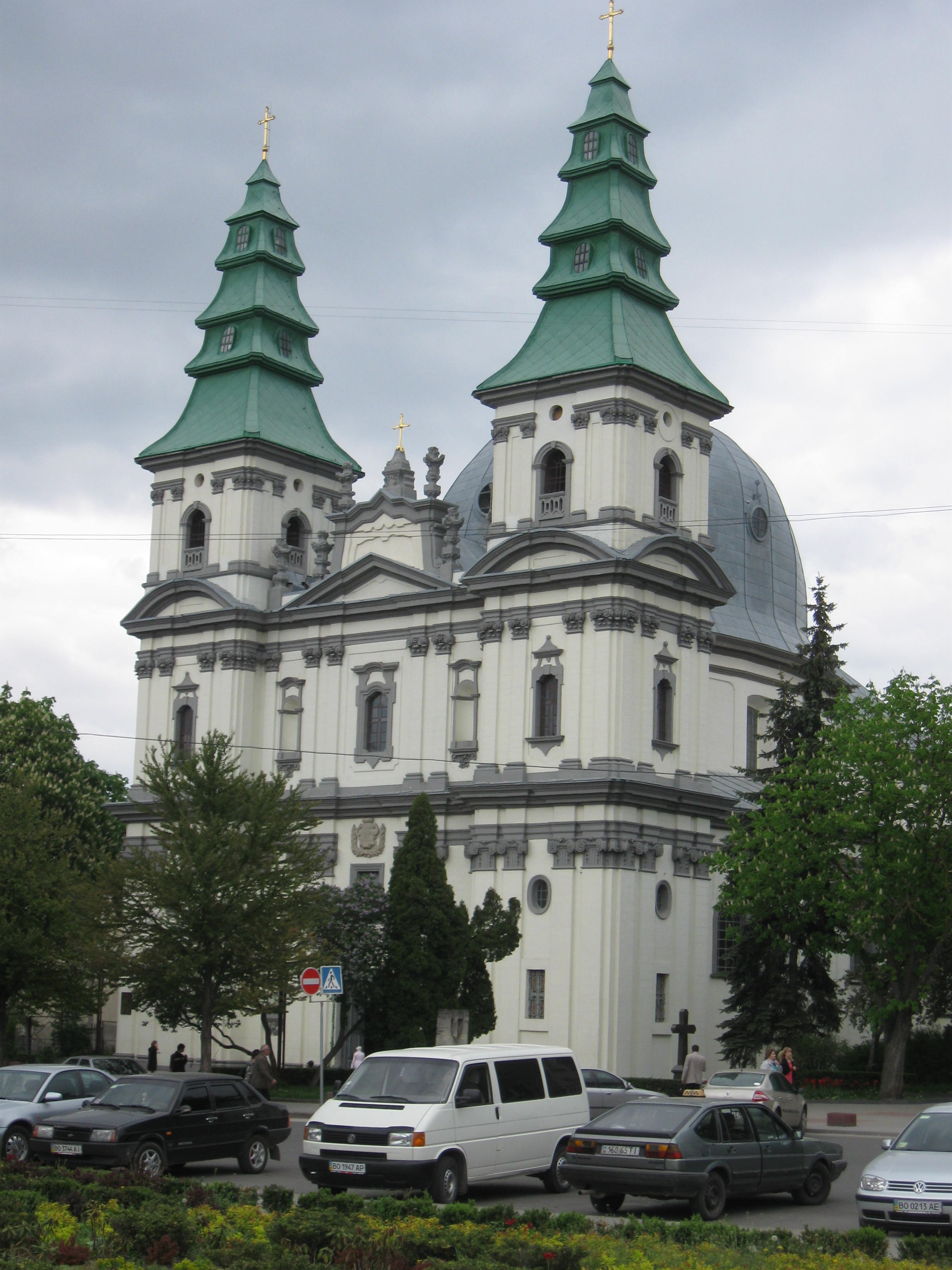
- Cathedral of the Immaculate Conception of the Holy Mother of God

- Coat of arms

Location
- Country: Ukraine
- Headquarters: Ternopil, Ternopil Oblast, Ukraine

Statistics
- Area: 8,346 km^{2} (3,222 sq mi)
- Population: Total; Catholics: (as of 2023); 634,000; 385,500 (60.8%)
- Parishes: 266

Information
- Denomination: Ukrainian Catholic
- Sui iuris church: Ukrainian Greek Catholic Church
- Rite: Byzantine Rite
- Established: 20 April 1993; 33 years ago
- Cathedral: Cathedral of the Immaculate Conception of the Holy Mother of God in Ternopil
- Secular priests: 334 (304 Diocesan, 30 Religious Orders)

Current leadership
- Pope: Leo XIV
- Major Archbishop: Sviatoslav Shevchuk
- Metropolitan Archbishop: Teodor Martyniuk, M.S.U.
- Suffragans: Eparchy of Buchach
- Auxiliary Bishops: Volodymyr Firman
- Bishops emeritus: Vasyl Semeniuk

Map

Website
- Website of the Archeparchy

The Archeparchy of Ternopil - Zboriv is an ecclesiastical territory or ecclesiastical province of the Ukrainian Greek Catholic Church — a particular Eastern Catholic Church, that is located in Ukraine. It was erected in 1993. As a metropolitan see, it has two suffragan sees — Buchach and Kamyanets-Podilskyi. The incumbent Metropolitan Archbishop is Teodor Martyniuk. The cathedral church of the archeparchy is the Cathedral of the Immaculate Conception of the Holy Mother of God in the city of Ternopil.

== History ==
- 20 April 1993: Established as Eparchy of Ternopil from the Ukrainian Catholic Archeparchy of Lviv.
- 21 July 2000: Lost territory to establish the Ukrainian Catholic Eparchy of Buchach.
- 21 July 2000: Gained territory from the suppressed Ukrainian Catholic Eparchy of Zboriv and renamed as Eparchy of Ternopil – Zboriv.
- 21 November 2011: Elevated as Archeparchy of Ternopil - Zboriv.
- 11 December 2015: Lost territory to restore the Ukrainian Catholic Eparchy of Kamyanets-Podilskyi.

== Leadership ==
Eparch of Ternopil

- Mykhailo Sabryha, C.Ss.R. (20 April 1993 – 21 July 2000 see below)

Eparchs of Ternopil – Zboriv

- Mykhailo Sabryha, C.Ss.R. (see above 21 July 2000 – 29 June 2006)
- Vasyl Semeniuk (19 October 2006 – 21 November 2011 see below)

Archeparchs of Ternopil - Zboriv

- Vasyl Semeniuk (see above 21 November 2011 – 17 October 2024), retired
- Teodor Martyniuk, M.S.U. (17 October 2024 – Present)

Auxiliary Bishops

- Vasyl Semeniuk (2004-2006), Titular Eparch of Castra Severiana
- Teodor Martyniuk, M.S.U. (2015-2024), Titular Eparch of Mopta
- Volodymyr Firman (2023-Present), Titular Eparch of Limisa

Other priests who became eparchs

- Yosafat Hovera (1993-2008), appointed Archiepiscopal Exarch of Lutsk in 2008
- Ivan Kulyk) (2005-2019), confirmed Eparch of Kamyanets-Podilskyi in 2019

== Gallery of eparchies ==
Ternopil-Zboriv

Buchach

Kamyanets-Podilskyi
