= Limisa =

Town in Kairouan Governorate, Tunisia

Coordinates: 36°02′13″N 9°41′29″E

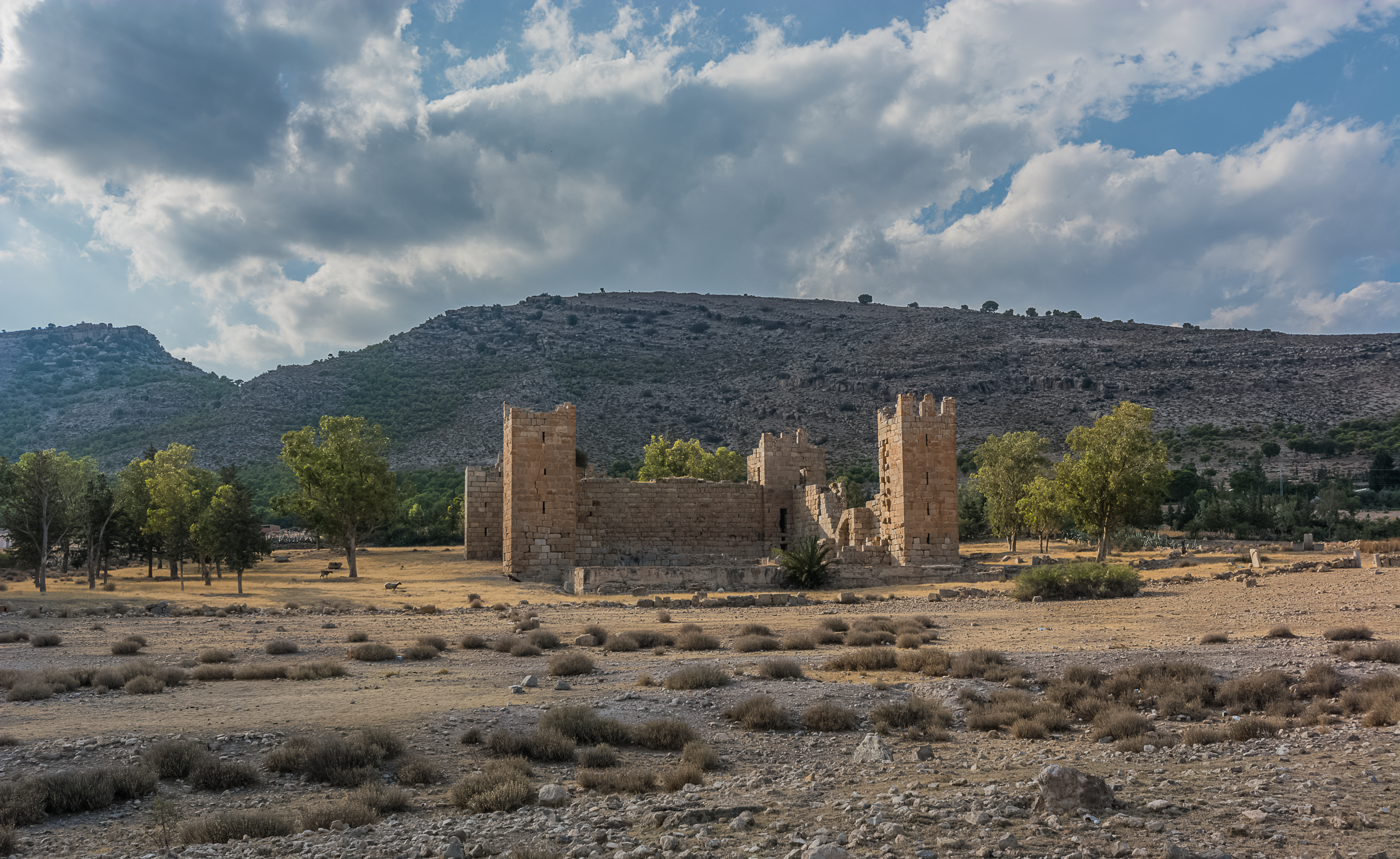
Ksar Lemsa

Limisa (today Aïn-Lemsa) is a town and archaeological site in Kairouan Governorate, Tunisia. It is located 50 kilometers west of kairouan. The town was a Roman Catholic diocese.

The street pattern of the village is fairly regular in its layout and terrace fields move down the hill from the town to the nearby wadi Oued Maarouf. The Parc National Djebel Serj is to the north of the town, but the town is best known for the ruins of a Byzantine fort known as Ksar Lemsa. The Cave Mine is nearby.

== History ==
During antiquity, Limisa was a Roman-Berber civitas in the province of Byzacena. The remains of the town have been identified with ruins at Henchir-Boudja near modern Limisa. Little is known of the ancient Roman city of Limisa. A few excavations have been carried out and only the Byzantine citadel and the small Roman theater are known. The municipal organization is also only slightly understood, as epigraphic evidence indicates Roman-dominated Limisa was initially governed by the Punic-style dual magistracy, the sufetes. An epigraphic corpus makes it possible to understand some aspects of the city from the architectural point of view as well as from its organization. The city had the status of civitas at least until the beginning of the reign of the emperor Septimius Severus then as a Municipium sometime before 208.

From an architectural point of view, epigraphy mentions an arch and the restoration of thermal baths built under Constantine at the end of the 4th century.

According to Victor of Vita the basilicas of Lemsa had been burned in 305.

The site was excavated between 1966 and 1969 by K. Belkhodja.

== Ksar Lemsa ==
At Henchir-Boudja may be the ruins of a Byzantine fortress, with 15 feet wide walls and towers.
