= Vasyl Semeniuk =

Ukrainian Greek Catholic archbishop (born 1949)

The Most Reverend Vasyl Semeniuk
- Metropolitan Archbishop Emeritus of Ternopil–Zboriv
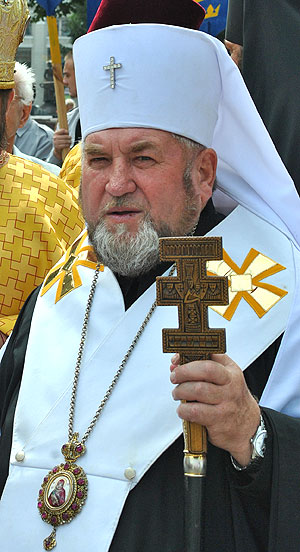
- Archbishop Semeniuk in 2015
- Native name: Василь Семенюк
- Province: Ternopil–Zboriv
- Diocese: Ternopil–Zboriv
- Installed: 22 December 2011
- Term ended: 17 October 2024
- Predecessor: (First Metropolitan)
- Successor: Teodor Martynyuk
- Other post: Titular Bishop of Castra Severiana (2004–2006)

Orders
- Ordination: 22 December 1974 by Volodymyr Sterniuk
- Consecration: 3 April 2004 by Lubomyr Husar

Personal details
- Born: Vasyl Semeniuk; 2 August 1949 (age 77) Dora, Stanislav Oblast, Ukrainian SSR
- Residence: Ternopil, Ukraine
- Education: John Paul II Catholic University of Lublin

Vasyl Semeniuk (Ukrainian: Василь Семенюк;born 2 August 1949) is a Ukrainian Greek Catholic hierarch, who served as the Metropolitan Archbishop of the Archeparchy of Ternopil–Zboriv from 2011 to 2024.

== Biography ==
Semeniuk was born in the village of Dora (now part of Yaremche), present-day Ivano-Frankivsk Oblast. He studied at an underground theological seminary in Lviv from 1969 to 1974 while working as a dispatcher to maintain his clandestine ministry during the Soviet era.

=== Priesthood ===
He was ordained to the priesthood on 22 December 1974 by Bishop Volodymyr Sterniuk. During the underground period of the UGCC, he served as a spiritual father for the secret seminary and provided pastoral care to the faithful in the Ternopil Oblast.

=== Episcopate ===
On 10 February 2004, Pope John Paul II confirmed his election as Auxiliary Bishop of Ternopil–Zboriv and assigned him the Titular See of Castra Severiana. He was consecrated on 3 April 2004 by Major Archbishop Lubomyr Husar.

In 2006, he was appointed the Eparchial Bishop of the territory. Upon the elevation of the see to a Metropolitan status on 22 December 2011, he became its first Metropolitan Archbishop. During his tenure, he oversaw the construction of approximately 60 churches and the restoration of the eparchial infrastructure.

=== Retirement ===
On 17 October 2024, the Vatican announced that Pope Francis accepted his resignation upon reaching the age limit of 75. He was succeeded by Teodor Martynyuk, whose enthronement took place in Ternopil on 8 December 2024.
