= Teodor Martyniuk =

Ukrainian Catholic archbishop

- Auxiliary Bishop of Ukrainian Catholic Archeparchy of Ternopil – Zboriv
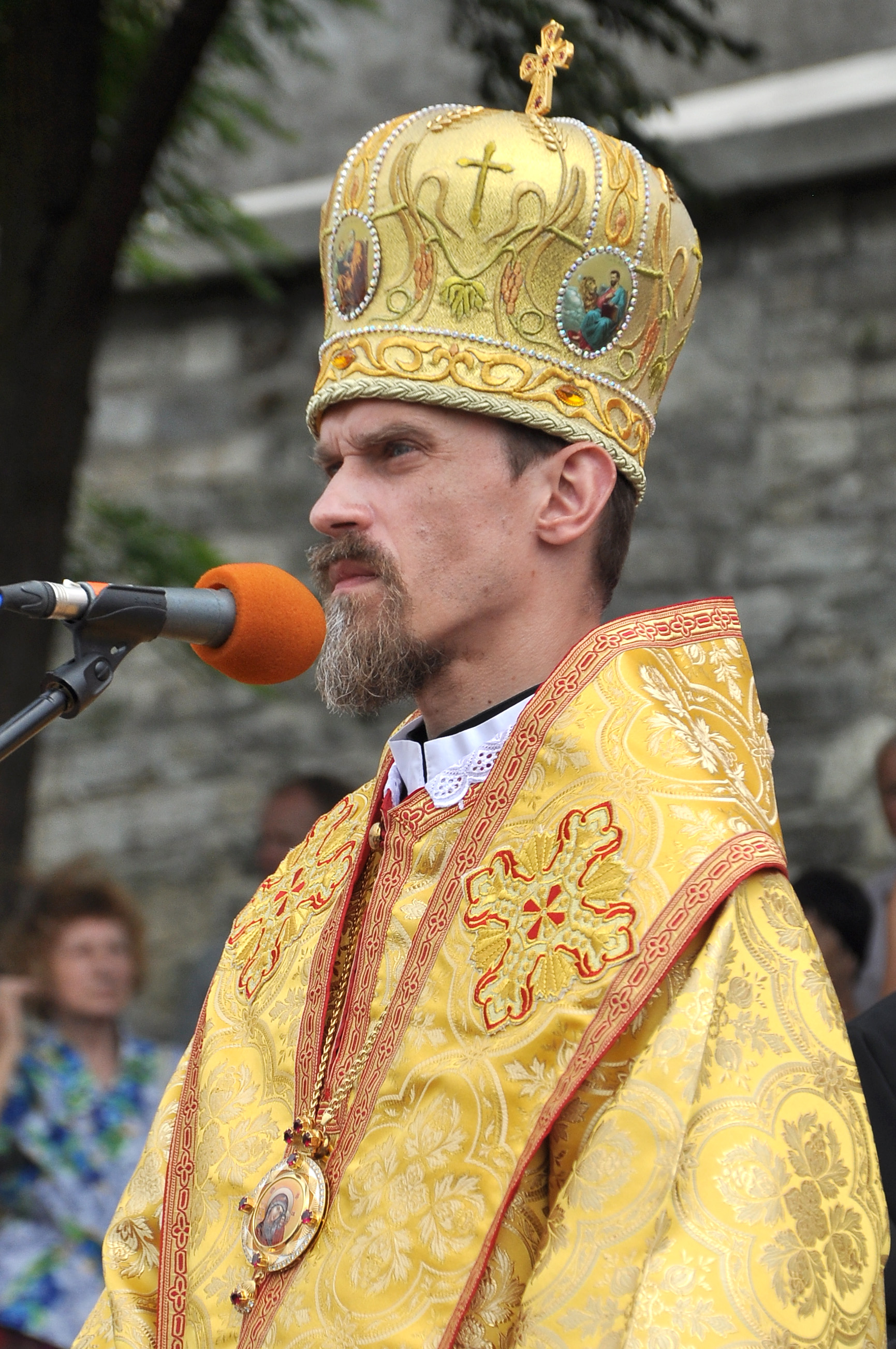
- Church: Ukrainian Greek Catholic Church
- Appointed: 12 March 2015
- Other posts: Hegumen of Univ Lavra of the Studite Rite (2010–2015); Titular Bishop of Mopta (2015–2024)

Orders
- Ordination: 20 Jan 2000 (Priest) by Julian Gbur
- Consecration: 22 May 2015 (Bishop) by Sviatoslav Shevchuk

Personal details
- Born: Taras Mykhaylovych Martyniuk; 1 February 1974 (age 52) Dora, Ukrainian SSR
- Coat of arms

Archbishop Teodor Martyniuk (also happens Martynyuk; Ukrainian: Теодор Мартинюк; born 1 February 1974 in Dora, Ivano-Frankivsk Oblast, Ukrainian SSR) is a Ukrainian Greek Catholic hierarch as Archbishop of Ternopil – Zboriv since 17 October 2024.

== Life ==
Bishop Teodor (his given name was Taras; Teodor is his monastic name), after graduation of the Pedagogical College in Kremenets, joined the Studite Brethren on April 7, 1993; he had monastic vows in the Univ Lavra on August 28, 1997, and was ordained as hieromonk on January 20, 2000, after graduation of Catholic University of Lublin in Poland.

He was superior of St. Michael monastery in Lviv (2003–2005) and then continued his studies in the Pontifical Oriental Institute in Rome with Doctor of Canon Law degree. During 2010–2015 he served as Hegumen of Univ Holy Dormition Lavra of the Studite Rite. Also since 2011 he has been professor of the Faculty of Eastern Canon Law at the Pontifical Oriental Institute.

On March 12, 2015, he was confirmed by the Pope as Auxiliary Bishop of Ternopil – Zboriv, Ukraine and Titular Bishop of Mopta. On May 22, 2015, he was consecrated as bishop by Major Archbishop Sviatoslav Shevchuk and other hierarchs of the Ukrainian Greek Catholic Church.

On October 17, 2024, he was appointed Archbishop of the same Archeparchy of Ternopil-Zboriv.

Catholic Church titles
Preceded by Venedykt Aleksiychuk	Hegumen of the Univ Holy Dormition Lavra of the Studite Rite; 23 July 2010–23 April 2015	Succeeded by Illya Mamchak
Preceded by Christopher James Coyne	Titular Bishop of Mopta; 12 March 2015–present	Succeeded by Incumbent
