= Volodymyr Sterniuk =

Ukrainian Greek Catholic archbishop

Volodymyr Sterniuk C.Ss.R.
- Titular Archeparch of Marcianopolis
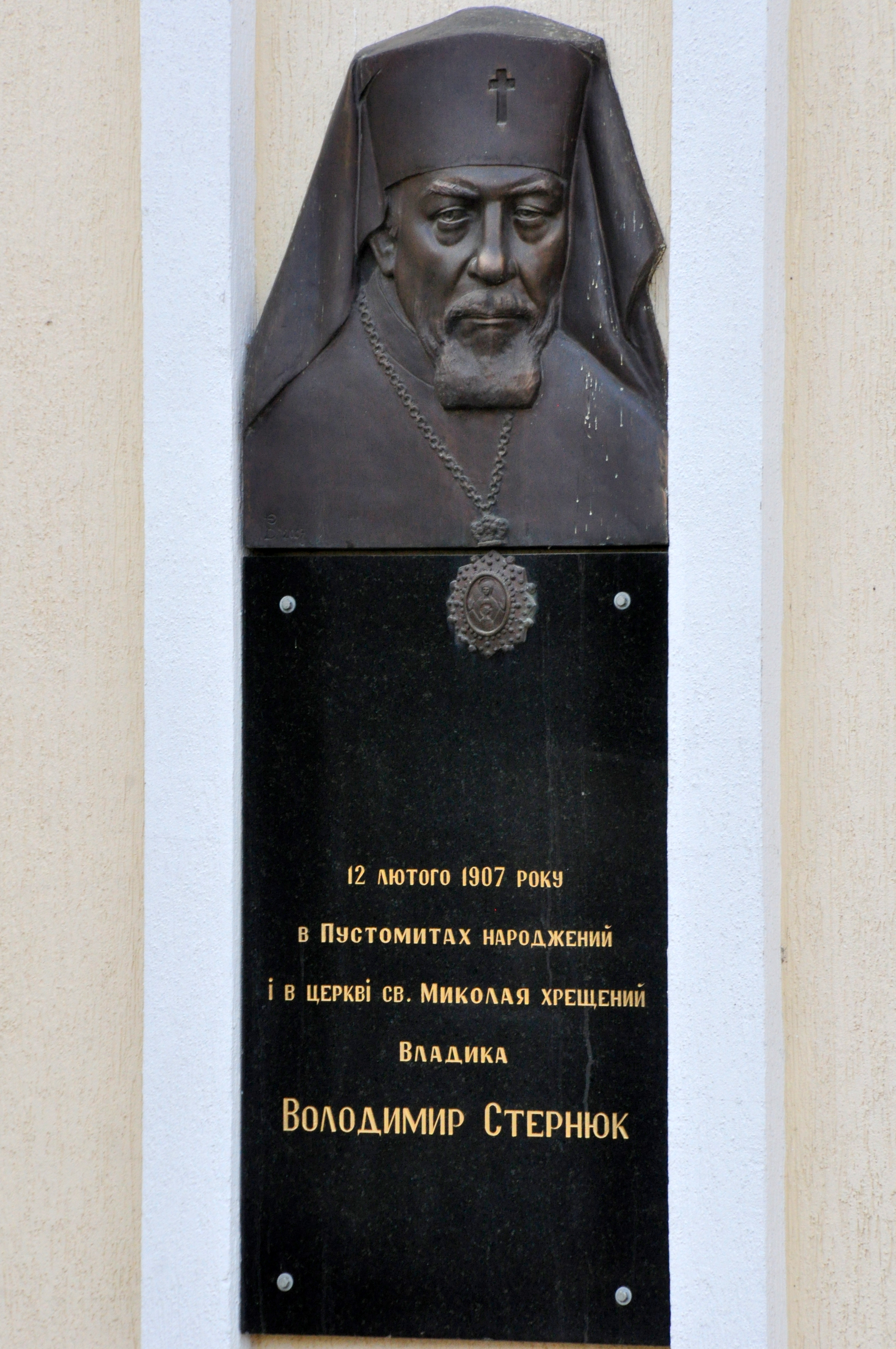
- Native name: Володимир Стернюк
- Church: Ukrainian Greek Catholic Church
- In office: 16 January 1991 – 29 September 1997
- Predecessor: Teofilo Camomot
- Successor: Peter Bryan Wells
- Previous posts: Auxiliary (Arch)Eparch of Lviv (1991-1996); Eparch of Przemyśl, Sambor, and Sanok (1964-1977)

Orders
- Ordination: 21 August 1931 by Basil Ladyka
- Consecration: 2 July 1964 by Vasyl Velychkovsky

Personal details
- Born: 12 February 1907 Pustomyty, Lemberg County, Kingdom of Galicia and Lodomeria, Cisleithania, Austria-Hungary
- Died: 29 September 1997 (aged 90) Lviv, Ukraine

Volodymyr Sterniuk (Ukrainian: Володимир Стернюк; 12 February 1907 – 29 September 1997) was a Ukrainian Greek Catholic archbishop and the acting head of the Ukrainian Greek Catholic Church (UGCC) in Ukraine from 1972-91.

Sterniuk was born in Pustomyty near the city of Lviv in 1907. He was born into the family of a priest. He studied philosophy and theology both in Ukraine and at the University of Louvain in Belgium. He was ordained in 1931 as a Redemptorist priest.

During World War II he served parishes in the Ternopil and Stanislaviv regions. He witnessed the liquidation of the Ukrainian Greek Catholic Church at the "synod of Lviv" by hiding in a loft of St. George's Cathedral. He was arrested by the Soviets in 1947 and spent five years in prison and labor camps in Arkhangelsk where he worked as a lumberman. While in the camp, he continued his priestly duties and occasionally managed to celebrate Divine Liturgy with a few crumbs of bread and drops of wine. After his release, he returned to his hometown where he worked various jobs including park gatekeeper, bookkeeper, janitor and nurse while secretly continuing his priestly ministry. He taught catechism, said Mass, and heard confessions in his spare time in his room or in the woods.

In July 1964 Sterniuk was secretly ordained bishop by Vasyl Velychkovsky and from 1972 to 1991 was the leader of the UGCC in Ukraine until Myroslav Lubachivsky returned from exile in 1991. From 1964-90, he lived in a single room above a paint shop. During this time, he was subject to constant surveillance and frequent raids by the Soviet police who confiscated his books, rosary, and chalice. During this time he wrote liturgical and theology texts, and ordained five to six priests a year.

In 1983, he became archbishop and the representative in Lviv for Myroslav Lubachivsky, the head of the Ukrainian Greek Catholic Church who was at the time residing in Rome. On 19 August 1990 he celebrated the first divine liturgy offered by a Greek-Catholic priest in the St. George's Cathedral since the Soviet liquidation of the Church. When he died of natural causes on 29 September 1997 a public funeral procession which attracted tens of thousands was conducted through the center of Lviv.
