= Giovanni Lajolo =

Italian cardinal (born 1935)

His Eminence Giovanni Lajolo
- President Emeritus of the Governorate of Vatican City State
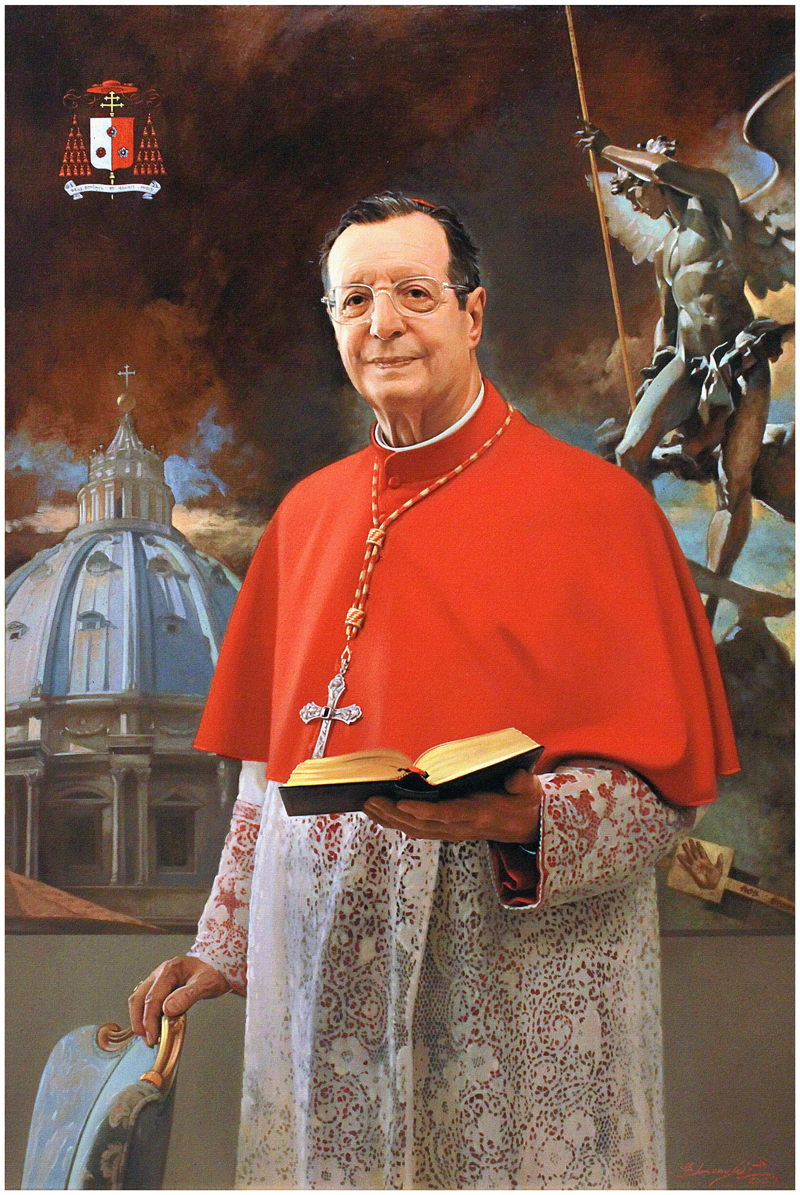
- Portrait of Lajolo
- Appointed: 15 September 2006
- Term ended: 1 October 2011
- Predecessor: Edmund Szoka
- Successor: Giuseppe Bertello
- Other post: Cardinal-Priest of S. Maria Liberatrice a Monte Testaccio "pro hac vice"
- Previous posts: Titular Archbishop of Caesariana (1988–2007); Secretary of the Administration of the Patrimony of the Apostolic See (1988–1995); Apostolic Nuncio to Germany (1995–2003); Secretary (Relations with States) of the Secretariat of State (2003–2006); President of the Pontifical Commission for Vatican City State (2006–2011)

Orders
- Ordination: 29 April 1960 by Ugo Poletti
- Consecration: 6 January 1989 by Pope John Paul II
- Created cardinal: 24 November 2007 by Pope Benedict XVI
- Rank: Cardinal-Deacon (2007–18); Cardinal-Priest (from 2018)

Personal details
- Born: Giovanni Lajolo; 3 January 1935 (age 91) Novara, Italy
- Denomination: Roman Catholic
- Education: Pontifical Roman Seminary; Pontifical Gregorian University; LMU Munich; Pontifical Ecclesiastical Academy
- Coat of arms

Styles of Giovanni Lajolo
- Reference style: His Eminence
- Spoken style: Your Eminence
- Informal style: Cardinal
- See: Caesariana

Giovanni Lajolo (born 3 January 1935) is an Italian cardinal and former president of the Pontifical Commission for Vatican City State and president of the Governorate of Vatican City State.

== Early life and ordination ==
Giovanni Lajolo was born on 3 January 1935 in Novara, Italy. He studied at the Seminary of Novara, the Pontifical Roman Seminary, and the Pontifical Gregorian University where he earned a licentiate in philosophy in 1955 and a licentiate in theology in 1959. He was ordained a priest on 29 April 1960. He entered LMU Munich where he studied for a doctorate in canon law which he was awarded in 1965. Then, in 1965, he entered the elite Pontifical Ecclesiastical Academy to study diplomacy, leaving in 1968.

== Secretariat of State ==
He entered the service of the Secretariat of State in 1970. He worked in the nunciature in Germany, collaborating with Corrado Bafile, future cardinal, from 1970 to November 1974. He was a staff member of the Council for Public Affairs of the Church from November 1974. He was named counsellor of nunciature on 1 January 1983. He closely followed the negotiations that led to the signing, in 1984, of the revision of the concordat between Italy and Holy See.

== Bishop ==
On 3 October 1988, Lajolo was appointed Secretary of the Administration of the Patrimony of the Apostolic See and Titular Archbishop of Caesariana by Pope John Paul II. He received his episcopal consecration on 6 January 1989 from John Paul, with archbishops Edward Idris Cassidy and José Tomás Sánchez serving as co-consecrators, in St. Peter's Basilica. Lajolo was named Nuncio to Germany on 7 December 1995, and Secretary for Relations with States on 7 October 2003. As Secretary, he served as the foreign minister of the Vatican.

== Secretary for Relations with States ==
He served as the Secretary for Relations with States in the Secretariat of State, or foreign minister of the Holy See, from 2003 until he was appointed president in 2006. He speaks Italian, German, English and French.

At a 2004 conference Lajolo said that perfect religious freedom does not exist in any country in the world: "Even in states in which the right to religious freedom is taken very seriously, perfection is missing, often because a concern for church-state separation leads to penalising religious activity in the public sphere." He went on to say that "government and taxation policies may limit the rights of parents to choose a religious education for their children or may penalise the charitable work of the church by not recognising its nonprofit status. Attempts to ban religiously motivated positions from public policy debates are also infringements on religious freedom." Lajolo and other speakers at the conference also voiced concern about the increasing threats to Christians in Iraq and in other countries with a Muslim majority following the U.S.-led invasion of Iraq.

In 2005 Lajolo was awarded Knight Grand Cross of the Order of Merit of the Italian Republic.

== Pontifical Commission for Vatican City State ==
On 22 June 2006, Lajolo was appointed President of the Pontifical Commission for Vatican City State and of the Governorate of Vatican City State by Pope Benedict XVI. In virtue of these two posts, he is delegated legislative and executive authority over the Vatican City by the pope. He was made Cardinal-Deacon of Santa Maria Liberatrice a Monte Testaccio in the consistory of 24 November 2007.

He submitted his resignation to Pope Benedict when he turned 75 in January 2010. His resignation was accepted on 3 September 2011, with Archbishop Giuseppe Bertello appointed as his successor as of 1 October 2011.

He was one of the cardinal electors who participated in the 2013 papal conclave that elected Pope Francis.

== Curial work ==
He was made a member of the Congregation for Bishops, Pontifical Council for Culture, and Administration of the Patrimony of the Apostolic See (of which he had once been Secretary) on 12 June 2008. On 25 January 2010, he was appointed a member of the Apostolic Signatura, the Church's highest court. He remained as a member of these bodies until his 80th birthday in 2015.

== Acknowledgements ==
- Order of Duke Trpimir (2008)

Diplomatic posts
Preceded by Lajos Kada	Apostolic Nuncio to Germany; 7 December 1995 – 7 October 2003	Succeeded by Erwin Josef Ender
Political offices
Preceded by Jean-Louis Tauran	Secretary for Relations with States; 7 October 2003 – 15 September 2006	Succeeded by Dominique Mamberti
Catholic Church titles
Preceded by Angelo Felici	— TITULAR — Titular Archbishop of Cæsariana; 3 October 1988 – 24 November 2007	Succeeded by Josaphat Oleh Hovera
Preceded by Lorenzo Antonetti	Secretary of the Administration of the Patrimony of the Apostolic See; 3 October 1988 – 7 December 1995	Succeeded by Claudio Maria Celli
Preceded by Jozef Zlatňanský	Secretary of the Interdicasterial Commission for the Church in Eastern Europe; 8 June 2004 – 15 September 2006	Succeeded by Dominique François Joseph Mamberti
Preceded by Edmund Szoka	President of the Governatorate of Vatican City State; 15 September 2006 – 1 October 2011	Succeeded by Giuseppe Bertello
Preceded by Edmund Szoka	President of the Pontifical Commission for Vatican City State; 15 September 2006 – 1 October 2011	Succeeded by Giuseppe Bertello
Preceded by Antonio María Javierre Ortas	Cardinal-Deacon of Santa Maria Liberatrice a Monte Testaccio; 24 November 2007 – 19 May 2018	Himself as Cardinal-Priest
Himself as Cardinal-Deacon	Cardinal-Priest 'pro hac vice' of Santa Maria Liberatrice a Monte Testaccio; 19 May 2018 –	Incumbent
