= Caesariana (Numidia) =

Caesariana (Cæsariana) was an Ancient city and diocese in Roman North Africa. It is now only a Roman Catholic titular see.

== History ==
It was one of over 120 cities in the Roman province of Numidia that were important enough to become a suffragan bishopric of the metropolitan of Carthage, but would fade away, plausibly at the seventh century advent of Islam.

Its ruins are at Kessaria (obviously still named after Caesariana) in modern Algeria.

Its only historically documented incumbent was not Catholic but the schismatic Donatist Cresconius, who attended the Council of Carthage of 411, where his heresy was condemned as such. Morcelli however attributes him (probably erroneously) to Caesarea in Numidia.

== Titular see ==
The diocese was nominally restored in 1933 as Latin titular bishopric of Cæsariana (Latin; Curiate Italian Cesariana).

It has had the following incumbents, of the fitting episcopal (lowest) rank, with two archiepiscopal exceptions:

- Fulton John Sheen (1951.05.28 – 1966.10.21) as Auxiliary Bishop of New York (NY, USA) (1951.05.28 – 1966.10.21); later Bishop of Rochester (USA) (1966.10.21 – 1969.10.06), emeritate as Titular Archbishop of Newport (1969.10.06 – death 1979.12.09)
- Titular Archbishop Angelo Felici (1967.07.22 – 1988.06.28) as papal diplomat and high Roman Curia official : Apostolic Pro-Nuncio (envoy) to the Netherlands (1967.07.22 – 1976.05.13), Apostolic Nuncio (ambassador) to Portugal (1976.05.13 – 1979.08.27), Apostolic Nuncio to France (1979.08.27 – 1988.06.28); previously Undersecretary of Sacred Congregation for Extraordinary Ecclesiastical Affairs (1964.02.07 – 1967.07.22); later created Cardinal-Deacon of Ss. Biagio e Carlo ai Catinari (1988.06.28 – 1999.01.09), Prefect of Congregation for the Causes of Saints (1988.07.01 – 1995.06.13), President of Pontifical Commission "Ecclesia Dei" (1995.12.16 – 2000.04.14), promoted Cardinal-Priest of Ss. Biagio e Carlo ai Catinari pro hac vice Title (1999.01.09 – death 2007.06.17)
- Titular Archbishop Giovanni Lajolo (1988.10.03 – 2007.11.24) as papal diplomat: Apostolic Nuncio (ambassador) to Germany (1995.12.07 – 2003.10.07), Secretary for Relations with States of Secretariat of State (2003.10.07 – 2006.09.15), Secretary of Interdicasterial Commission for the Church in Eastern Europe (2004.06.08 – 2006.09.15), President of Pontifical Commission for the Vatican City State (2006.09.15 – 2011.10.01), President of Governorate of the Vatican City State (2006.09.15 – 2011.10.01); previously Secretary of Administration of the Patrimony of the Apostolic See (1988.10.03 – 1995.12.07); later created Cardinal-Deacon of S. Maria Liberatrice a Monte Testaccio (2007.11.24 [2008.01.27] – ...)
- Yosafat Hovera = Josaphat Oleh Hovera (2008.01.15 – ...), as Archiepiscopal Exarch of Lutsk of the Ukrainians (Ukraine), no previous prelature

== Sources and external links ==
- GCatholic
