= Władysław Rubin =

Polish Cardinal (1917–1990)

His Eminence Władysław Rubin
- Prefect Emeritus of the Congregation for the Oriental Churches
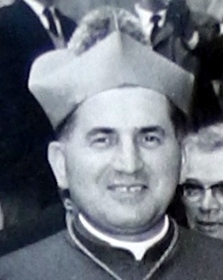
- Władysław Rubin, Prefect of the Congregation for the Oriental Churches
- Church: Roman Catholic Church
- Appointed: 27 June 1980
- Term ended: 30 October 1985
- Predecessor: Paul-Pierre Philippe
- Successor: Duraisamy Simon Lourdusamy
- Other post: Cardinal-Priest of Santa Maria in Via Lata pro hac vice (1990)
- Previous posts: Auxiliary Bishop of Gniezno (1964–67); Titular Bishop of Serta (1964–79); Secretary General of the Synod of Bishops (1967–79)

Orders
- Ordination: 30 June 1946 by Rémy-Louis Leprêtre
- Consecration: 29 November 1964 by Stefan Wyszyński
- Created cardinal: 30 June 1979 by Pope John Paul II
- Rank: Cardinal-deacon (1979–90); Cardinal-priest (1990)

Personal details
- Born: Władysław Rubin; 20 September 1917 Toky, Austro-Hungary
- Died: 28 November 1990 (aged 73) Vatican City
- Buried: Lubaczow Pro-Cathedral
- Parents: Ignacy Rubin; Tekla Saluk
- Education: Pontifical Gregorian University
- Motto: Crux Domini spes et Victoria

Styles of Władysław Rubin
- Reference style: His Eminence
- Spoken style: Your Eminence
- Informal style: Cardinal
- See: none

Władysław Rubin (20 September 1917 – 28 November 1990) was a Polish cardinal of the Roman Catholic Church who served as Prefect of the Congregation for the Oriental Churches from 1980 to 1985, and was elevated to the cardinalate in 1979.

== Biography ==
Władysław Rubin was born in Toky, now in Ternopil Oblast, Ukraine, to Ignacy Rubin and his wife Tekla Saluk. He studied at Jan Kazimiers University in Lviv and the University of Saint Joseph in Beirut, Lebanon. During World War II, Rubin was arrested and interned in a forced labour camp, joining the Polish Army after his release. Ordained to the priesthood by Archbishop Rémy-Louis Leprêtre, OFM, on 30 June 1946, he then did pastoral work with Polish refugees in Lebanon until 1949. Rubin furthered his studies at the Pontifical Gregorian University in Rome from 1949 to 1953, when he resumed his pastoral ministry among Polish refugees, this time in Italy. From 1959 to 1964, he was rector of the Pontifical Polish College in Rome.

On 17 November 1964, Pope Paul VI appointed Rubin Auxiliary Bishop of Gniezno and Titular Bishop of Serta, as well as delegate of Cardinal Stefan Wyszyński for the spiritual care of Polish émigrés. He received his episcopal consecration on the following 29 November from Cardinal Wyszyński, with Archbishop Karol Wojtyła and Bishop Stefan Bareła serving as co-consecrators, in the church of Sant'Andrea al Quirinale. From 1964 to 1967, Rubin served as rector of the church and residence of St. Stanisław in Rome. On 27 February 1967, he was named Secretary General of the World Synod of Bishops.

Pope John Paul II created him Cardinal-Deacon of Santa Maria in Via Lata in the consistory of 30 June 1979, and appointed him Prefect of the Congregation for the Oriental Churches on 27 June 1980. From 1980 to 1983, Cardinal Rubin was a member of the General Secretariat of the Synod of Bishops. He later stepped down as Prefect of the Congregation for the Oriental Churches on 30 October 1985, after five years of service.

Rubin was elevated to a cardinal priest, with the same titular church, on 26 November 1990, but died two days later in Vatican City, at age 73. He is buried in the Cathedral of St. Stanislaus in Lubaczów.

Catholic Church titles
Preceded by Paul-Pierre Philippe, OP	Prefect of the Congregation for the Oriental Churches; 1980–1985	Succeeded by Duraisamy Simon Lourdusamy
