= Vasyl Hovera =

Ukrainian priest (born 1972)

Mitred Archpriest Vasyl Hovera
- Apostolic Administrator of Apostolic Administration of Kazakhstan and Central Asia
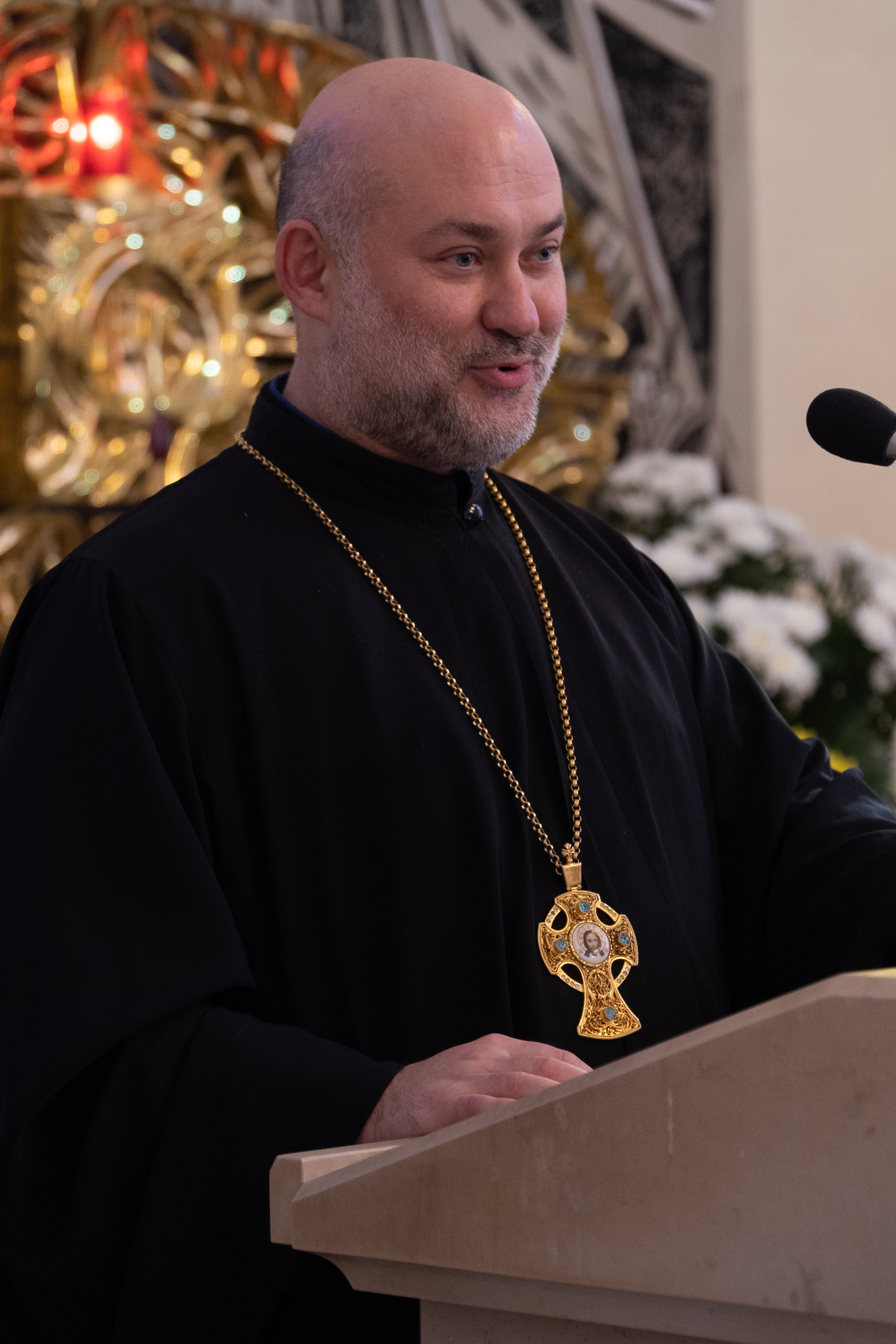
- Church: Eastern Catholic Churches
- Appointed: 11 November 2002 (as Apostolic Delegate); 1 June 2019 (as Apostolic Administrator)
- Predecessor: New Creation
- Successor: Incumbent
- Other post(s): Apostolic Delegate for Kazakhstan and Central Asia (2002–2019)

Orders
- Ordination: 2 March 1997 (Priest) by Wasyl Medwit

Personal details
- Born: Vasyl Yaroslavovych Hovera; 11 December 1972 (age 52); Ivano-Frankivsk, Ukrainian SSR

Vasyl Hovera (Ukrainian: Василь Говера; born 11 December 1972) is a Ukrainian-born hierarch for Eastern Catholic Churches of the Byzantine Rite, who serves as an Apostolic Administrator of the Apostolic Administration of Kazakhstan and Central Asia for Faithful of Byzantine Rite, with a see in Karaganda, for Kazakhstan, Kyrgyzstan, Tajikistan, Turkmenistan and Uzbekistan since 1 June 2019.

== Life ==
Rev. Hovera was born in the family of clandestine Greek-Catholics of Yaroslav and Mariya in Ivano-Frankivsk, where he grew up. After graduation from school he joined a theological seminary and simultaneously studied at the Catholic University of Lublin, Poland, from 1990 until 1996 with magister of dogmatic theology degree.

He was ordained as a deacon on 28 July 1996 and as a priest on 2 March 1997 for the Ukrainian Catholic Archeparchy of Lviv, after completing theological studies. In the same year he began his missionary and pastoral work among Catholic faithful of the Byzantine rite in Kazakhstan. In a short time, the Greek Catholic parishes were erected in Karaganda, Pavlodar, Astana, Satbayev, Shiderty and Almaty: in addition to these parishes, were formed a dozen communities, scattered in other places. Therefore, Fr. Hovera on 11 November 2002 was appointed an Apostolic Delegate for Kazakhstan and Central Asia with a dependency from the Congregation for the Oriental Churches and in 2005 was elevated in a rank of Mitred Archpriest.

On 1 June 2019 Mitred Archpriest Hovera was appointed by Pope Francis as the first Apostolic Administrator of the newly created Apostolic Administration of Kazakhstan and Central Asia for Faithful of Byzantine Rite without dignity of bishop.

== Personal details ==
His father, Yaroslav Hovera, was a prisoner in the Soviet Union Gulag and spent 15 years in the corrective labor camp in Karaganda.

Apostolic Administrator Hovera has two brothers, who also are a clergymen: Rev. Andriy Ivan Hovera (born 1966), Synkellos of the Ukrainian Catholic Archeparchy of Ternopil–Zboriv, and Bishop Yosafat Hovera (born 1967), Archiepiscopal Exarch of Ukrainian Catholic Archiepiscopal Exarchate of Lutsk.

Catholic Church titles
Preceded by Wasyl Medwit (as Apostolic Visitor)	Apostolic Delegate for Kazakhstan and Central Asia; 2002–2019	Succeeded by himself as Apostolic Administrator
Preceded by himself as Apostolic Delegate	Apostolic Administrator of Apostolic Administration of Kazakhstan and Central Asia; 2019–present	Succeeded by Incumbent
