= List of Catholic dioceses in Ukraine =

The Catholic Church in Ukraine comprises

- one Latin ecclesiastical province headed by the Metropolitan archbishop of Lviv, with 6 suffragan dioceses each headed by a bishop
- a more extensive hierarchy of the Eastern Catholic
  - a large Ukrainian Catholic Church sui iuris (Byzantine Rite), consisting of 4 metropolis in Ukraine and additional 4 around the world,
  - additional eparchies of Ruthenian Catholics (also Byzantine rite) and Armenian Catholics (Armenian Rite).

There are no pre-diocesan or other exempt Latin Church jurisdictions.

There is an Apostolic Nunciature to Ukraine as papal diplomatic representation (embassy-level), in the national capital Kyiv.

== Episcopal Conference of Ukraine ==
=== Current Byzantine (Greek) Catholic (Arch)Eparchies ===
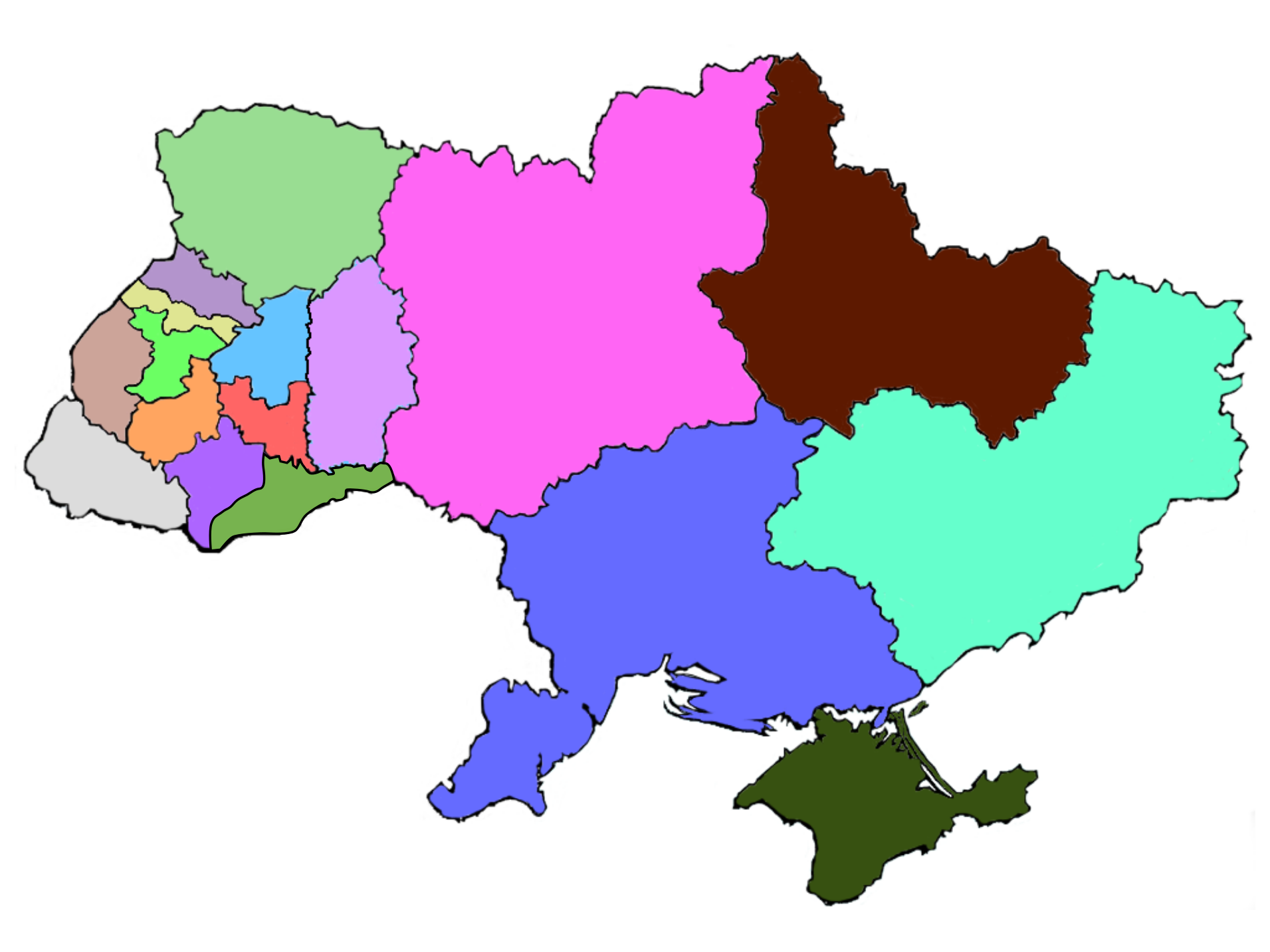

==== Ukrainian Greek Catholic Metropolitanates ====
- Ukrainian Catholic Major Archeparchy of Kyiv–Halych, the Major Archeparchy and head of the particular church
  - Ukrainian Catholic Archeparchy of Kyiv, the proper Metropolitan Archeparchy, at Kyiv
  - Ukrainian Catholic Archiepiscopal Exarchate of Crimea (Krym), on the Russian-annexed Crimea, with cathedral see at Simferopol
  - Ukrainian Catholic Archiepiscopal Exarchate of Donetsk
  - Ukrainian Catholic Archiepiscopal Exarchate of Kharkiv
  - Ukrainian Catholic Archiepiscopal Exarchate of Lutsk
  - Ukrainian Catholic Archiepiscopal Exarchate of Odesa
- Ukrainian Catholic Archeparchy of Lviv (Metropolitan Archeparchy)
  - Ukrainian Catholic Eparchy of Stryi
  - Ukrainian Catholic Eparchy of Sambir – Drohobych
  - Ukrainian Catholic Eparchy of Sokal – Zhovkva
- Ukrainian Catholic Archeparchy of Ternopil – Zboriv (Metropolitan Archeparchy)
  - Ukrainian Catholic Eparchy of Buchach
  - Ukrainian Catholic Eparchy of Kamyanets-Podilskyi
- Ukrainian Catholic Archeparchy of Ivano-Frankivsk (Metropolitan Archeparchy)
  - Ukrainian Catholic Eparchy of Chernivtsi
  - Ukrainian Catholic Eparchy of Kolomyia

==== Ruthenian Greek Catholic ====
(Byzantine rite)

- Greek Catholic Eparchy of Mukachevo, directly dependent on the Holy See.

=== Current Latin Dioceses ===
==== Ecclesiastical province of Lviv ====
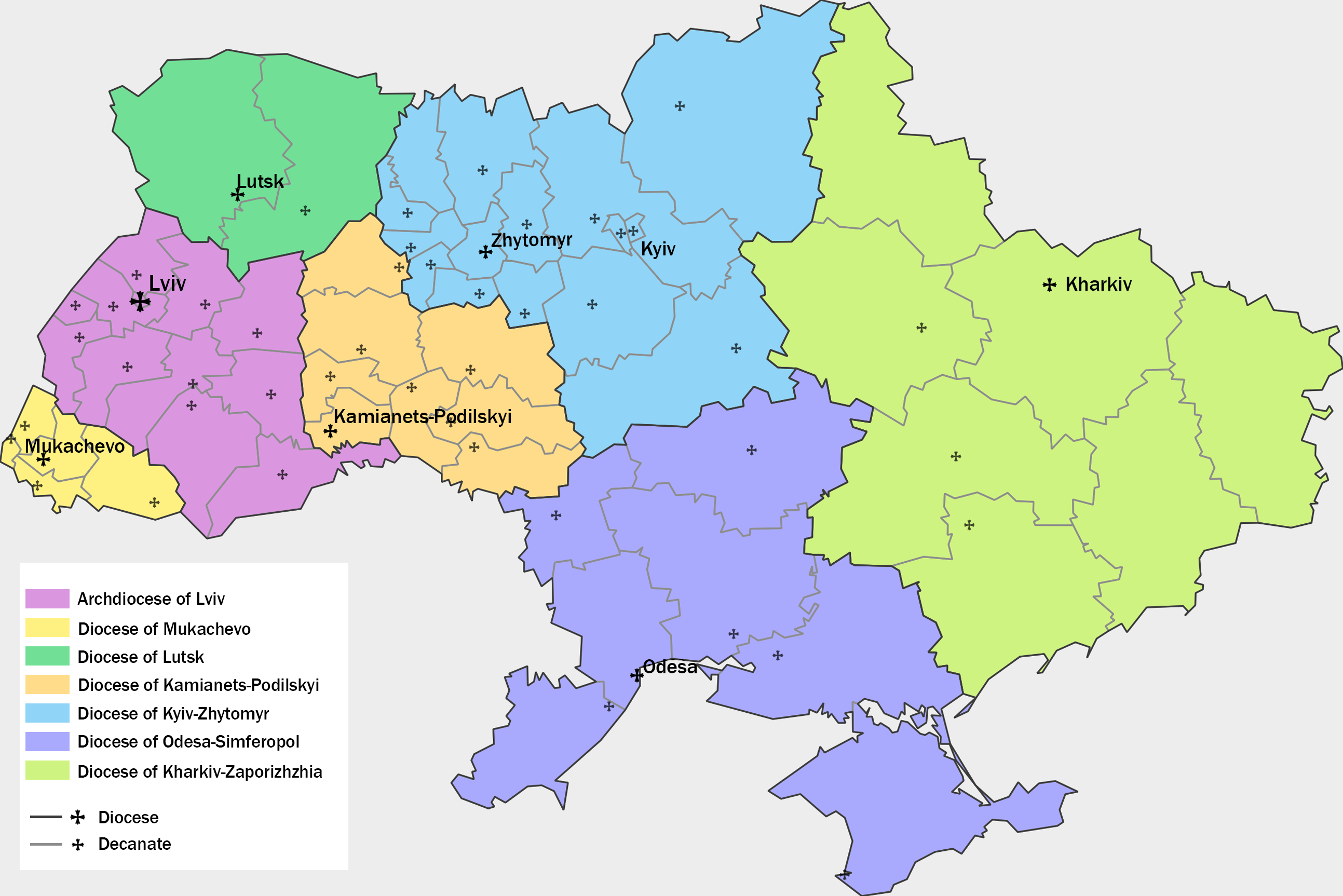

- Metropolitan Archdiocese of Lviv (1375–1945, 1991–)
  - Diocese of Kyiv-Zhytomyr (1320–1925 as diocese of Kyiv (Zhytomyr), 1991–)
  - Diocese of Kamyanets-Podilskyi
  - Diocese of Lutsk
  - Diocese of Mukachevo
  - Diocese of Kharkiv-Zaporizhzhia
  - Diocese of Odesa-Simferopol

Note that, even though Crimea was annexed by the Russian Federation in March 2014, this is not taken into account by the Catholic hierarchy. The Latin Church Catholics of Crimea therefore belong to the Diocese of Odesa-Simferopol which is a suffragan of the Archdiocese of Lviv.

=== Current Armenian Catholic Jurisdiction ===
(Armenian rite)

- exempt Armenian Catholic Ordinariate of Eastern Europe, directly dependent on the Holy See
- Armenian Catholic Archeparchy of Lviv, directly dependent on the Armenian Catholic Patriarchate of Cilicia, defunct since World War II.

== Former jurisdictions ==
Former jurisdictions without current successor sees are :

TO BE CHECKED/COMPLETED

=== Titular sees ===
(all Latin Church)

TO BE WIKIFIED

- Metropolitan Titular archbishoprics : Archdiocese of Sugdaea (Sugdæa)
- Archiepiscopal : Archdiocese of Bosporus, Chersonesus in Zechia, Archdiocese of Phulli
- Episcopal titular bishoprics : Diocese of Caffa, Diocese of Cembalo, Diocese of Soldaia

=== Other Defunct Latin ===
- Roman Catholic Archdiocese of Halyč (Galicia)
- Roman Catholic Diocese of Lodomeria
- Roman Catholic Diocese of Zhytomyr

=== Defunct Eastern Catholic ===
- Ukrainian Catholic Eparchy of Lutsk–Ostroh
- Ukrainian Catholic Eparchy of Volodymyr–Brest
- Ukrainian Catholic Eparchy of Zboriv
- Ukrainian Catholic Apostolic Exarchate of Volhynia, Polesia and Pidliashia
- Ukrainian Catholic Apostolic Exarchate of Łemkowszczyzna (not in Ukrainian territory nor serving Ukrainians, rather Lemko people)

== See also ==
- List of Catholic dioceses (structured view)

== Sources and external links ==
- GCatholic.org - data for all sections
- Catholic-Hierarchy entry
