= Alfons Maria Stickler =

Austrian Catholic cardinal (1910–2007)

His Eminence Alfons Maria Stickler SDB
- Archivist & Librarian Emeritus of the Holy Roman Church
- See: Volsinium (Titular)
- Installed: 27 May 1985 – 1 July 1988
- Predecessor: Antonio Samorè
- Successor: Antonio María Javierre Ortas
- Other posts: Previously Pro-Archivist of the Holy Roman Church, Pro-Librarian of the Holy Roman Church

Orders
- Ordination: 27 March 1937
- Consecration: 8 September 1983 by Pope John Paul II
- Created cardinal: 25 May 1985 by Pope John Paul II

Personal details
- Born: 23 August 1910 Neunkirchen, Austria-Hungary
- Died: 12 December 2007 (aged 97) Vatican City
- Buried: Cemetery of the Salesian Community, Catacomb of Callixtus, Rome, Italy

Styles of Alfons Maria Stickler
- Reference style: His Eminence
- Spoken style: Your Eminence
- Informal style: Cardinal
- See: Volsinium (titular)

Alfons Maria Stickler SDB (23 August 1910 – 12 December 2007) was an Austrian cardinal of the Roman Catholic Church. He served as Archivist and Librarian of the Holy Roman Church from 1985 to 1988. Stickler was elevated to the cardinalate in 1985, and was the oldest member of the College of Cardinals. A traditionalist, he was a strong supporter of the Tridentine Mass and clerical celibacy.

== Biography ==
Stickler was born in Neunkirchen, near Vienna, as the second of twelve children. He entered the Salesians of Don Bosco in a German novitiate, and made his profession on 15 August 1928. Thereafter, Stickler studied philosophy in Germany and then in Austria, Turin, and Rome. He studied canon law at the Pontifical Athenaeum of S. Apollinare (from where he received his doctorate) and the Pontifical Lateran University, and was ordained to the priesthood on 27 March 1937. (Stickler studied with Stephan Kuttner, who lived to see his first pupil in the history of canon law become a cardinal.)

Stickler taught at the Salesian Pontifical University as Professor of Canon Law and Church Legal History for eight years. From 1958 to 1966 he served as rector of the University, having previously served as Dean of the Canon Law Faculty since 1953. Stickler participated as a peritus, or expert, at the Second Vatican Council (1962–1965), working as a member on the Commission for the Clergy, the Commission for the Liturgy, and (in his capacity as rector of the Salesian University) the commission directed by the Congregation for Seminaries and Universities. From the close of the council until 1968, Stickler was president of the newly founded Institutum Altioris Latinitas.

On 8 September 1983, he was appointed Titular Archbishop of Volsinium, Pro-Librarian of the Holy Roman Church, and Pro-Archivist of the Holy Roman Church. Stickler received his episcopal consecration on the following 1 November from Pope John Paul II himself, with Archbishops Eduardo Martínez Somalo and Rosalio José Castillo Lara serving as co-consecrators, in the Sistine Chapel. He was created Cardinal-Deacon of San Giorgio in Velabro by John Paul II in the consistory of 25 May 1985, becoming full Librarian and Archivist two days later, on 27 May.

Stickler reported that Karol Wojtyła, the future Pope John Paul II had confided to him that during his time as a student at the Pontificium Athenaeum Internationale Angelicum (subsequently renamed the Pontifical University of Saint Thomas Aquinas and often known simply as the Angelicum) Wojtyła made a pilgrimage in 1947 to Pietrelcina to visit Padre Pio who told Wojtyła that one day he would ascend to "the highest post in the Church." Stickler added that Wojtyła believed that the prophecy was fulfilled when he became a cardinal.

Stickler served as Librarian and Archivist until his resignation on 1 July 1988. During his tenure he promoted the construction of underground storage for the conservation and consultation of all the codices and printed books of the library. He chose to be raised to the rank of Cardinal-Priest (with the same title) on 29 January 1996, after spending ten years as a Cardinal Deacon.

Upon the death of Johannes Willebrands on 1 August 2006, Stickler became the oldest living cardinal. In 2007, he celebrated the seventieth anniversary of his priestly ordination.

Stickler studied the history of canon law with Stephan Kuttner and published on that subject.

Stickler died on Wednesday, December 12, 2007, at 7.30 pm, in his private apartment at the Vatican City.

His funeral rite was presided by Pope Benedict XVI, took place on Friday December 14, in the altar of the chair of Saint Peter's Vatican Basilica.

He was buried in the cemetery of the Salesian community in the catacombs of San Callisto in Rome.

== Support for tradition ==
Stickler consistently defended the position that the Tridentine Mass was never forbidden or suppressed. He believed that the Mass of Paul VI contradicted the true wishes of the Second Vatican Council, and told the Latin Mass Society of England and Wales that its movement "has full legitimacy in the Church".

On 20 May 1995, Stickler stated that in 1986 a commission of nine cardinals (Stickler, Ratzinger (future Pope Benedict XVI), Mayer, Oddi, Casaroli, Gantin, Innocenti, Palazzini, and Tomko) appointed by Pope John Paul II unanimously gave a negative answer to the question "Did Pope Paul VI or any other competent authority legally forbid the widespread celebration of the Tridentine Mass in the present day?" and to the question "Can any bishop forbid any priest in good standing from celebrating the Tridentine Mass?" He said that eight of the nine were in favour of drawing up a general permission declaring that everyone could choose the old form of the Mass as well as the new.

"The Case for Clerical Celibacy: Its Historical Development and Theological Foundations", written by Stickler, was published in 1995 by Ignatius Press. It treats of the theological reasons and scriptural and magisterial roots of celibacy for Catholic priests.

Catholic Church titles
Preceded by Antonio Samorè	Archivist of the Holy Roman Church; 8 September 1983 – 1 July 1988	Succeeded by Antonio María Javierre Ortas
Records
Preceded by Johannes Willebrands	Oldest living Member of the Sacred College; 1 August 2006 – 12 December 2007	Succeeded by Paul Augustin Mayer
