= Diocese of Vladimir =

Diocese of Vladimir may refer to the following ecclesiastical jurisdictions in Eastern Europe :

- Russian Orthodox Eparchy of Vladimir
- the former Roman Catholic Diocese of Vladimir (Lodomeria)
