= Luigi Dadaglio =

Catholic cardinal (1914–1990)

His Eminence Luigi Dadaglio
- Major Penitentiary and Archpriest of the Basilica di Santa Maria Maggiore
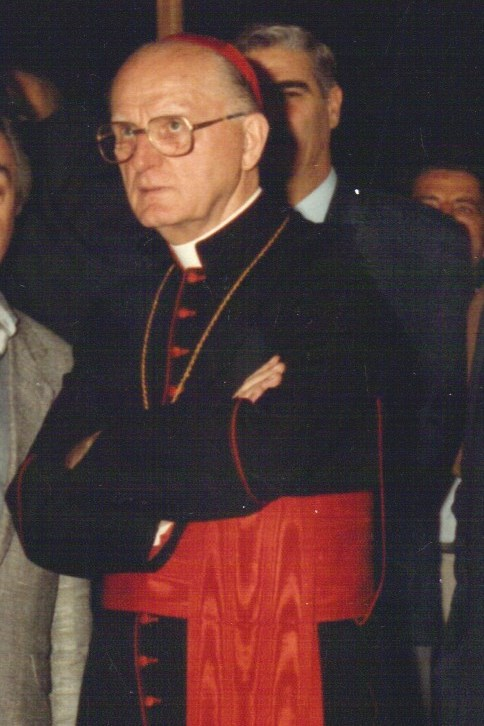
- Dadaglio in 1988.
- Church: Roman Catholic Church
- Appointed: 15 December 1986
- Term ended: 22 August 1990
- Predecessor: Carlo Confalonieri
- Successor: Ugo Poletti
- Other post: Cardinal-Deacon of San Pio V a Villa Carpegna (1985–90)
- Previous posts: Apostolic Nuncio to Venezuela (1961–67); Titular Archbishop of Lerus (1961–85); Apostolic Nuncio to Spain (1967–80); Secretary of the Congregation for Sacraments and Divine Worship (1980–82); Secretary for the Sacraments of the Congregation for Divine Worship (1982–84); Major Pro-Penitentiary of the Apostolic Penitentiary (1984–85); Major Penitentiary of the Apostolic Penitentiary (1985–90)

Orders
- Ordination: 22 May 1937
- Consecration: 8 December 1961 by Amleto Giovanni Cicognani
- Created cardinal: 25 May 1985 by Pope John Paul II
- Rank: Cardinal-Deacon

Personal details
- Born: Luigi Dadaglio; 28 September 1914 Sezzadio, Kingdom of Italy
- Died: 22 August 1990 (aged 75) Policlinico Agostino Gemelli, Rome, Italy
- Education: Pontifical Lateran University; Pontifical Ecclesiastical Academy
- Motto: Sola virtus manet
- Coat of arms

Styles of Luigi Dadaglio
- Reference style: His Eminence
- Spoken style: Your Eminence
- Informal style: Cardinal
- See: Lerus (titular see)

Luigi Dadaglio (28 September 1914 – 22 August 1990) was a Roman Catholic Cardinal and Major Penitentiary of the Apostolic Penitentiary.

== Early life ==
He was born in Sezzadio, Italy. He was educated at the Seminary of Acqui. He was ordained on 22 May 1937. From 1938 until 1942 he continued his studies at the Pontifical Lateran University where he earned a doctorate in utroque iure (in both canon and civil law). He later studied at the Pontifical Ecclesiastical Academy in Rome where from 1941 until 1943 he studied diplomacy.

== Early priesthood ==
He joined the Vatican Secretariat of State (section of Ordinary Affairs) in 1942. He was the secretary in the nunciature in Haiti and Dominican Republic from 1946 until 1950 when he was promoted to be the Auditor in the apostolic delegation to the United States, until 1953. He served as auditor in Canada and in Australia also. He was transferred to be the counselor in the nunciature in Colombia from 1958 until 1960. He was in charge, provisionally, of the nunciature in Venezuela in April 1960, until he himself was named Nuncio in Venezuela on 28 October 1961.

== Episcopate ==
He was appointed titular Archbishop of Lerus by Pope John XXIII. He was consecrated on 8 December 1961 by Amleto Giovanni Cicognani, Cardinal Secretary of State, who was assisted by Archbishop Angelo Dell'Acqua, substitute of the Secretariat of State. He attended the Second Vatican Council. He was appointed Apostolic Nuncio to Spain on 8 July 1967. He was named Secretary of the Congregation for Divine Worship and the Discipline of the Sacraments on 4 October 1980. Pope John Paul II named him Pro-Major Penitentiary on 8 April 1984.

== Cardinalate ==
He was created and proclaimed Cardinal-Deacon of S. Pio V a Villa Carpegna in the consistory of 25 May 1985. Having been created a Cardinal he was then named full Major Penitentiary two days later. He was named Archpriest of the Basilica di Santa Maria Maggiore in 1986. He resigned the penitentiary on 6 April 1990. He died on 22 August.

== Personal life ==
Dadaglio was one of the people accused on the so-called Pecorelli list, alleging membership in Freemasonry of 121 men associated with the Vatican, where he is listed with the code name “LUDA”, supposedly initiated on 8 October 1967. This list was named for the Italian journalist Carmine Pecorelli (himself a member of Propaganda Due, assassinated in 1979), who published it in his journal Osservatore Politico in 1978, but it had also been published elsewhere in Panorama two years earlier.

== Honours ==
- Knight Grand Cross of the Order of Civil Merit (Kingdom of Spain, 18 March 1977).
- Knight Grand Cross of the Order of Charles III (Kingdom of Spain, 20 October 1980).

Catholic Church titles
Preceded by Antonio Riberi	Apostolic Nuncio to Spain; 8 July 1967 – 4 October 1980	Succeeded by Antonio Innocenti
Preceded by Giuseppe Paupini	Major Penitentiary of the Apostolic Penitentiary; 8 April 1984 – 6 April 1990	Succeeded by William Wakefield Baum
Preceded by Carlo Confalonieri	Archpriest of the Basilica di Santa Maria Maggiore; 15 December 1986 – 22 August 1990	Succeeded by Ugo Poletti
Preceded by Paul-Pierre Philippe	Cardinal-Deacon of S. Pio V a Villa Carpegna; 1985–1990	Succeeded by José Tomás Sánchez
