= Yosafat Hovera =

Ukrainian Greek Catholic bishop (born 1967)

- Archiepiscopal Exarch of Ukrainian Catholic Archiepiscopal Exarchate of Lutsk
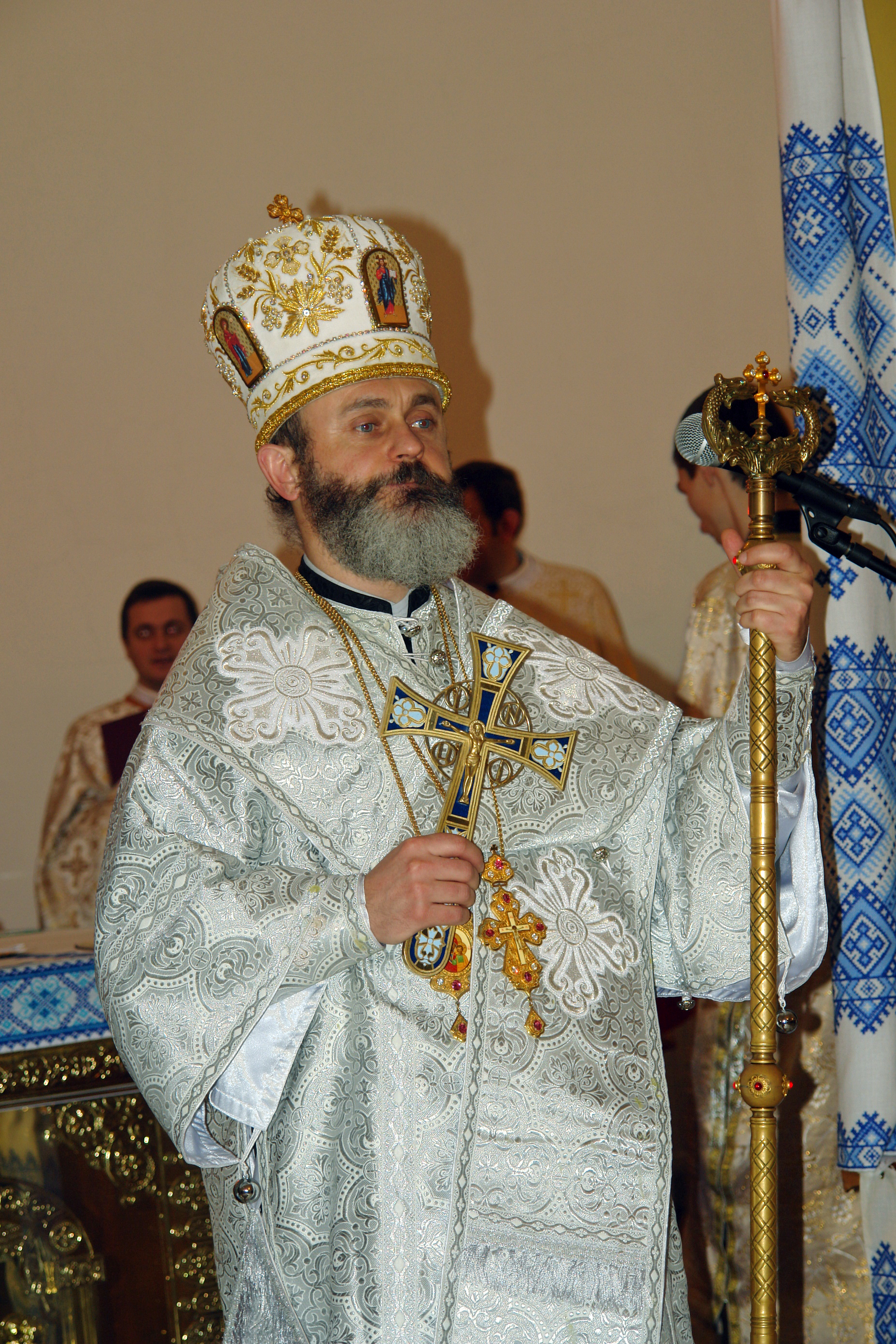
- Church: Ukrainian Greek Catholic Church
- Appointed: 15 January 2008
- Predecessor: New Creation
- Successor: Incumbent
- Other post: Titular Bishop of Caesariana (since 2008)

Orders
- Ordination: 30 May 1990 (Priest) by Yulian Voronovskyi
- Consecration: 7 April 2008 (Bishop) by Lubomyr Husar

Personal details
- Born: Oleh Yaroslavovych Hovera; 12 September 1967 (age 59) Ivano-Frankivsk, Ukrainian SSR
- Coat of arms

Bishop Yosafat Oleh Hovera (Ukrainian: Йосафат Олег Говера; born 12 September 1967 in Ivano-Frankivsk, Ukrainian SSR) is a Ukrainian Greek Catholic hierarch as an Archiepiscopal Exarch of Ukrainian Catholic Archiepiscopal Exarchate of Lutsk and Titular Bishop of Caesariana since 15 January 2008.

== Life ==
Bishop Hovera was born in the family of clandestine Greek-Catholics in Ivano-Frankivsk, where he grew up. After graduation from school he joined a clandestine theological seminary.

He was ordained as priest for the Ukrainian Catholic Archeparchy of Lviv on 30 May 1990, after completing clandestine theological studies, and was appointed as a parish priest in Velyka Berezovytsia. Fr. Hovera continued his studies in the Catholic University of Lublin from 1996 until 1999. After returning to Ukraine he was appointed as a vice-rector of the Major Theological Seminary in Ternopil (1999–2004). During 2004–2007 he again continued his studies, but this time in Rome, in the Pontifical Oriental Institute with a licentiate degree in pastoral theology. In 2007 he was appointed as a Rector of the Theological Seminary in Ternopil.

On 15 January 2008, Hovera was appointed, and on 7 April 2008, was consecrated to the Episcopate as the Titular Bishop of Caesariana. The principal consecrator was Cardinal Lubomyr Husar, the Head of the Ukrainian Greek Catholic Church.

== Personal details ==
His father, Yaroslav Hovera, was a prisoner in the Soviet Union Gulag and spent 15 years in the corrective labor camp in Karaganda.

Bishop Hovera has a two brothers, who also are a clergymen: Rev. Andriy Ivan Hovera (born 1966), Synkellos of the Ukrainian Catholic Archeparchy of Ternopil–Zboriv, and Rev. Vasyl Hovera (born 1972), Apostolic Administrator for Apostolic Administration of Kazakhstan and Central Asia.

Catholic Church titles
Preceded by Giovanni Lajolo	Titular Bishop of Caesariana; 2008–present	Succeeded by Incumbent
New title	Archiepiscopal Exarch of Lutsk; 2008–present	Succeeded by Incumbent
