= Salesian Pontifical University =

Pontifical university

- Università Pontificia Salesiana
- Seal
- Latin: Pontificia Studiorum Universitas Salesiana
- Former name: Pontificio Ateneo Salesiano
- Type: Pontifical university
- Established: 3 May 1940
- Religious affiliation: Catholic; (Salesians of Don Bosco)
- Location: Piazza dell’Ateneo Salesiano, 1, Rome, Italy; 41°57′37″N 12°31′15″E
- Language: Italian
- Website: www.unisal.it

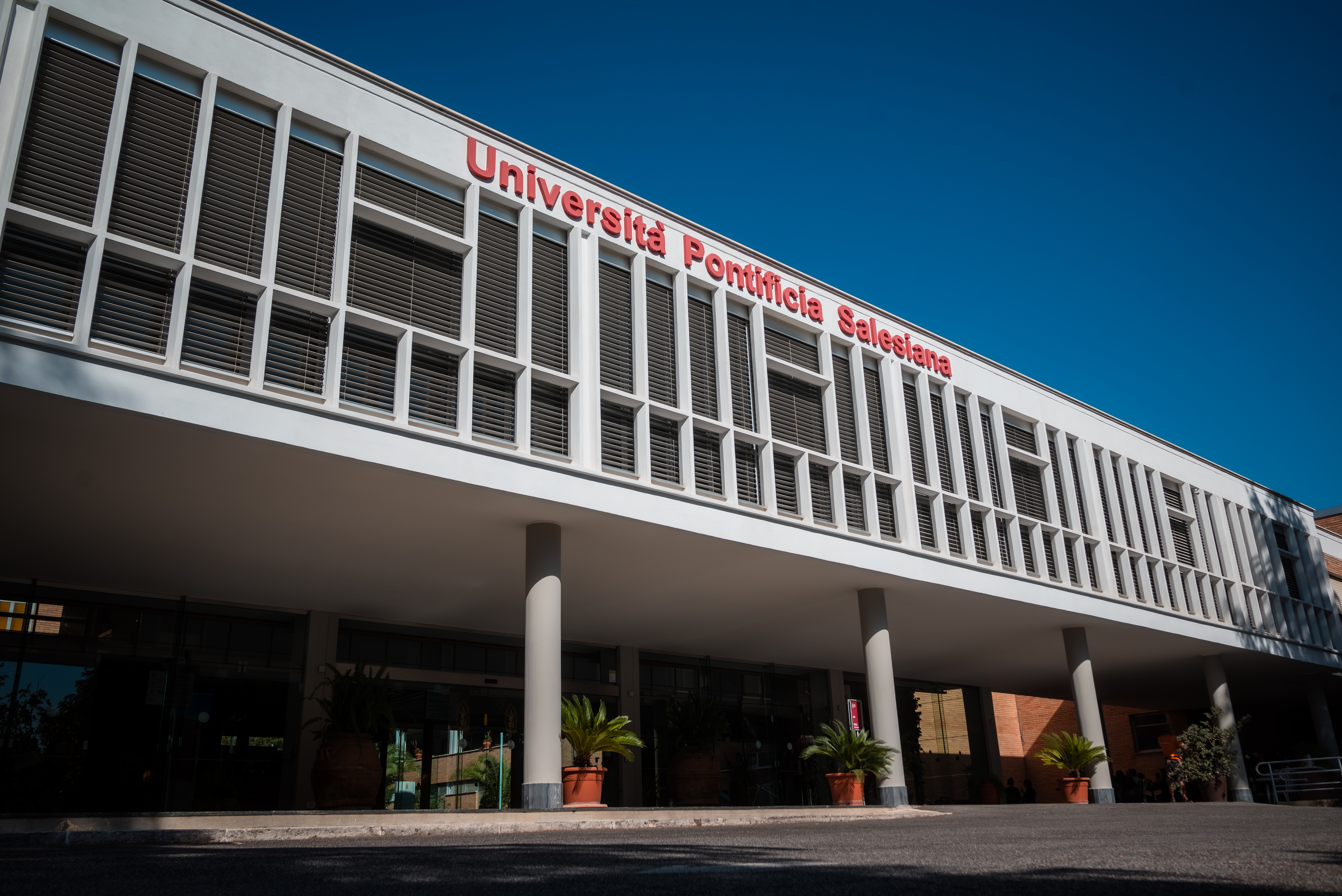
Main entrance of the university in Rome

The Salesian Pontifical University (Italian: Università Pontificia Salesiana; Latin: Pontificia Studiorum Universitas Salesiana) is a pontifical university in Italy run by the Salesians of Don Bosco. It has three campuses, one in Rome, one in Turin, and one in Jerusalem. The Salesian Pontifical University is an ordinary member of the International Federation of Catholic Universities, the European Federation of Catholic Universities, the European University Association and the International Association of Universities.

== History ==
The university began with the founding of the Foglizzo Canavese theological studentate in 1904, which in 1923 moved to Turin. The university was canonically erected by the Congregation for Catholic Education with the decree of 3 May 1940 (Prot. N. 265/40) with the official title Pontificio Ateneo Salesiano (Latin for 'Salesian Pontificial Athenaeum'). During the Second World War students and teachers were transferred to the Salesian house in Bagnolo Piemonte.

In 1958 the Salesian Pontifical Athenaeum moved to Rome. On 24 May 1973, Pope Paul VI approved its new title Pontificia Studiorum Universitas Salesiana (Salesian Pontifical University) with the motu proprio Magisterium vitae. On 8 December 1986, a Department of Youth Pastoral and Catechetics was constituted by an agreement between the Faculties of Theology and Sciences of Education.

In 2012 the Faculty of the Sciences of Social Communication began to offer Catholic priests (who, by virtue of their priestly studies, possess a Bachelor's degree in either Philosophy or Theology) a three-year Master's Degree in Pastoral Communication that includes a one-year Bachelor's in Communication.

On 10 October 2006, Cardinal Tarcisio Bertone, in his first year as Cardinal Secretary of State, gave a homily there celebrating the opening of the new academic year.

== Faculties ==
- Theology
- Educational Sciences "Auxilium"
- Philosophy
- Christian and Classical Literature
- Sciences of Social Communication

== Publications ==
The university's publications are edited by the Italian publishing house Libreria Ateneo Salesiano (LAS), founded in 1974. From 2022 to 2023, Marco Cardinali_{it} was its editor-in-chief.

Since 1939, the university has published Salesianum (ISSN 3035-4293), the university's official journal and an interdisciplinary quarterly of philosophy and theology.

== Notable members ==
=== Faculty ===
- Tarcisio Bertone
- Alfons Maria Stickler
- Ludwig Schwarz
- Antonio María Javierre Ortas

=== Alumni ===
- Angelo Amato
- Rosalio José Castillo Lara
- Joseph Zen
- Carlos Filipe Ximenes Belo
- George Njaralakatt
