= Jozef Zlatňanský =

Monsignor Jozef Zlatňanský DTh
- Bishop; Secretary of the Permanent Interdisciplinary Commission for Eastern Europe in the Vatican
- Church: Roman Catholic Church
- Province: Rome
- Metropolis: Rome
- Diocese: Rome
- See: Holy See
- Elected: 11 June 1997
- In office: 11 February 2017
- Quashed: 8 June 2004
- Other post: Titular Bishop of Montefiascone^{(1997-2017)}

Orders
- Ordination: 22 December 1951
- Consecration: 20 July 1997 by Jozef Cardinal Tomko
- Rank: Papal Prelate

Personal details
- Born: Jozef Zlatňanský; March 13, 1927 Topoľčianky, Slovakia
- Died: February 11, 2017 (aged 89) Nitra, Slovakia
- Buried: Topoľčianky
- Denomination: Roman Catholic
- Education: Lateran University, Rome
- Motto: Veritas Justitia Caritas^{(Latin)} Truth Justice Charity^{(English)}
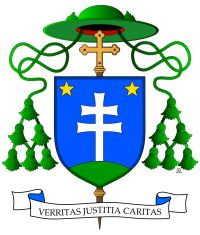
- Coat of arms

Styles of Jozef Zlatňanský
- Reference style: Bishop
- Spoken style: Monsignor
- Religious style: The Most Reverend

Jozef Zlatňanský (13 March 1927 – 11 February 2017) was a Catholic bishop.

Born in Czechoslovakia, Zlatňanský was ordained to the priesthood in 1951. In 1997, he was named bishop and the secretary of the Interdicasterial Commission for the Church in Eastern Europe serving from 1997 until 2004.
