= San Pio V a Villa Carpegna =

Church building in Rome, Italy

- Church of Saint Pius V at Villa Carpegna (in English); S. Pii V ad locum vulgo Villa Carpegna (in Latin); San Pio V sa Villa Carpegna (in Tagalog)
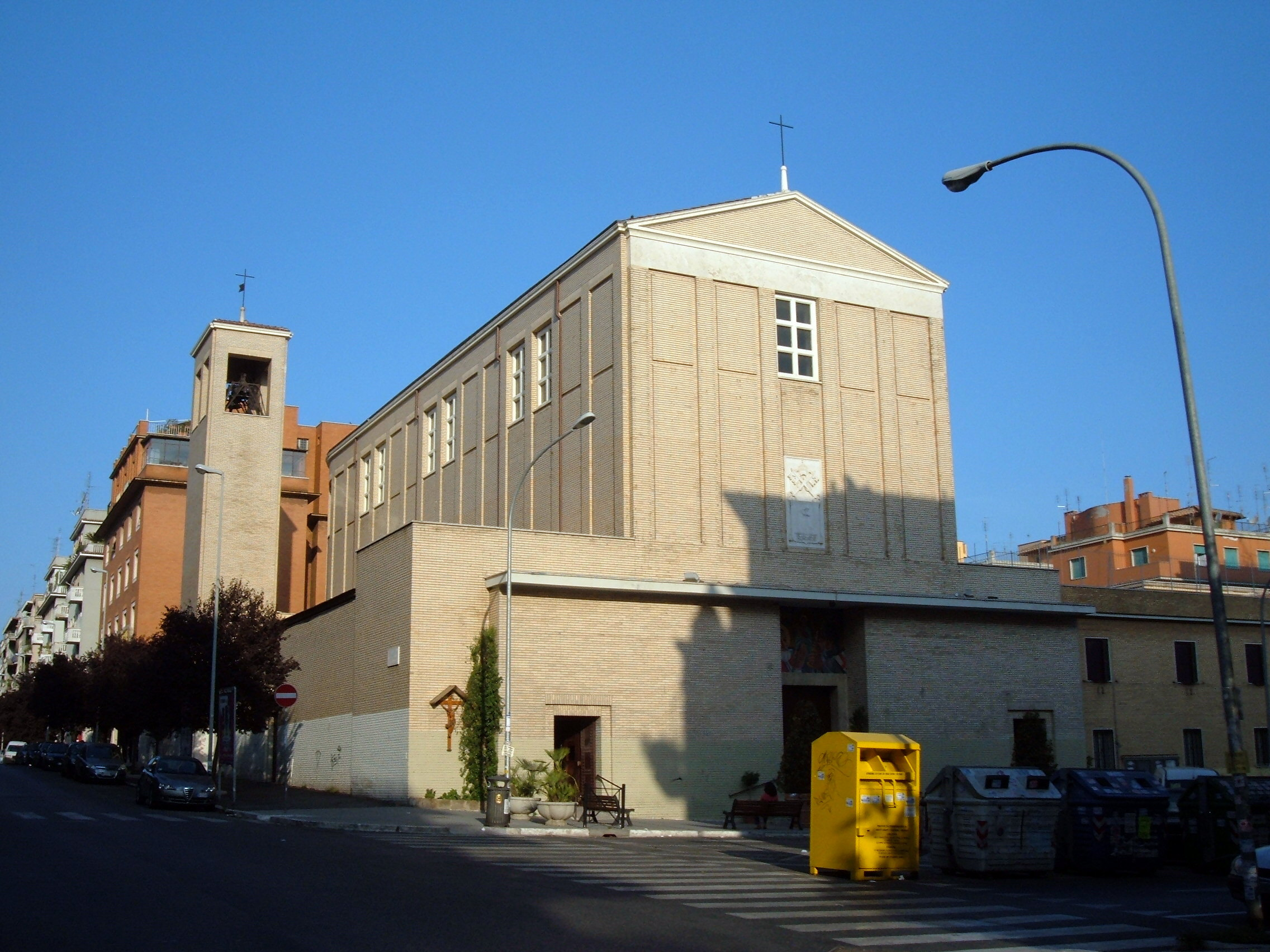

- Location within Rome

Religion
- Affiliation: Roman Catholic
- Rite: Roman Rite
- Ecclesiastical or organisational status: Titular church
- Leadership: James Harvey
- Patron: Pope Saint Pius V
- Year consecrated: 1962

Location
- Location: Largo San Pio V 3, Rome, Italy
- Coordinates: 41.8965°N 12.4314°E

Architecture
- Architect: Tullio Rossi
- Type: Church

San Pio V a Villa Carpegna is a titular church in the Catholic Church. It was established on 5 March 1973, by Pope Paul VI for a Cardinal-Deacon. The title was previously raised pro hac vice after José Tomás Sánchez was installed cardinal-priest in 2002, ten years after serving as cardinal-deacon. The title is now held by an American Cardinal, James Harvey.

== History ==
The Church of Saint Pius V was founded on 10 December 1951 by Clemente Micara, the Cardinal Vicar of Rome. It was designed by architect Tullio Rossi in 1952. It was consecrated by Archbishop Luigi Traglia on 24 February 1962. The Title of Cardinal Protector of the Church was established on 5 March 1973 by the late Pope Paul VI.

== Exterior ==
The church was designed by Tullio Rossi in a somewhat modernized neo-Romanesque style, and completed in 1962.

There is a nave with aisles, a semi-circular apse and a campanile at the end of the left-hand aisle. The fabric is in puce brick, with little decoration.

The façade is two-storey, with the lower storey to aisle roof level being a simple rectangular form which encloses a smaller rectangle brought forward and containing the nave and aisle doorways. The nave door is inset, and above it is a mosaic by Giuseppe Stracota depicting Pope Pius V and St George with the Madonna and Child, and a background showing the Battle of Lepanto (at which the navy of the Ottoman Turks was defeated during his pontificate). The first story of the façade, and the body of the nave above the aisles, is divided into panels by relief pilasters in brick without capitals. On the façade there are six pilasters, ending in a wide blank stone architrave above which is the triangular pediment. In the centre is a vertical rectangular window formed of six squares divided by stone mullions, and below this are a coat of arms. The body of the nave has six windows of identical form on each side, in three pairs. The campanile is an unadorned brick tower on a square plan, with rectangular bell openings.

== Interior ==
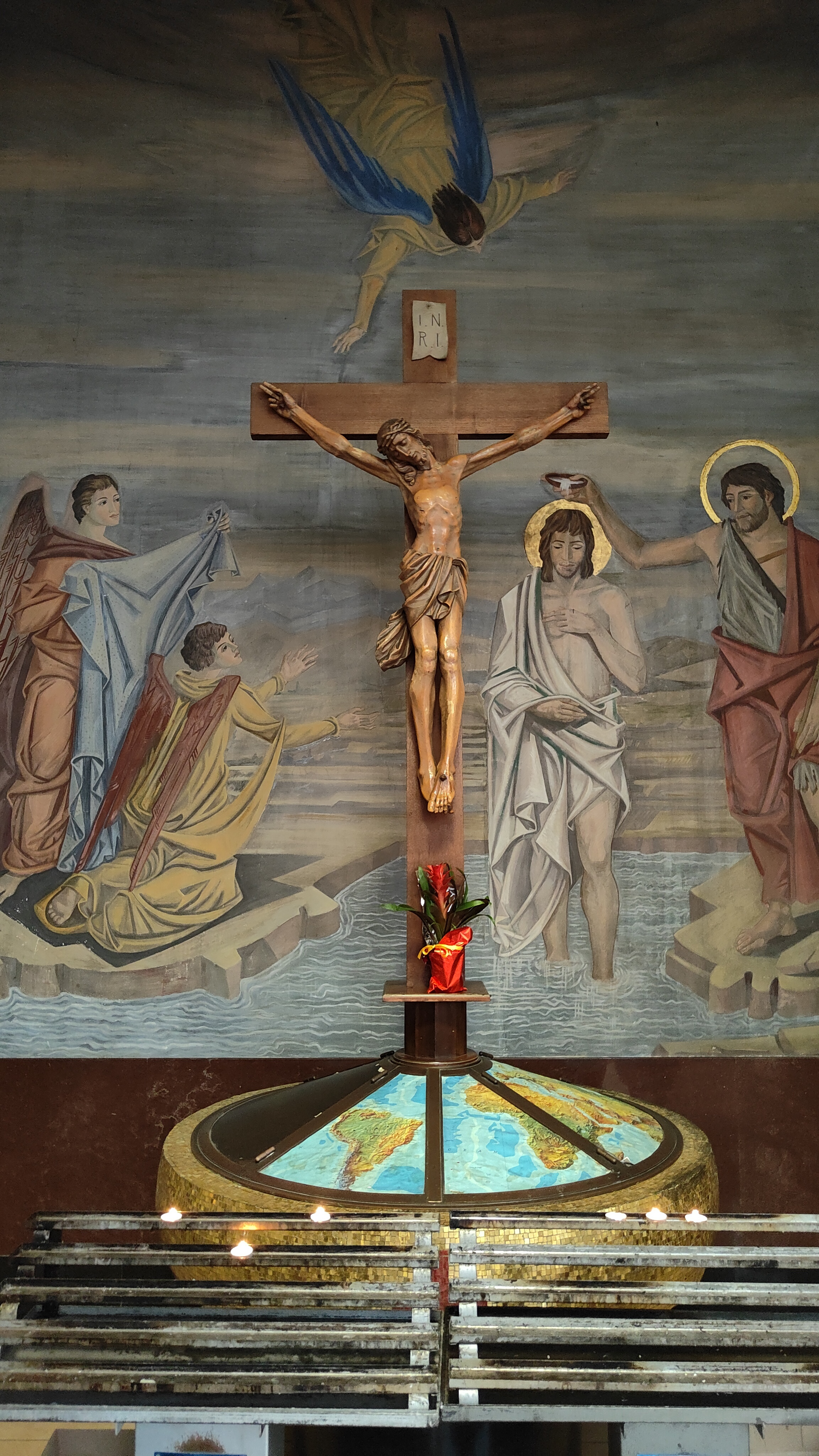
Interior crucifix and mural in the Church of Saint Pius V

The interior has aisle arcades formed by square red marble pillars without capitals. The lower apse is panelled in the same red marble, and has an icon of Pope Pius V. The upper walls are in white with outline rectangular panels in gilt. There are some notable devotional artworks: the crucifix is by Francisco Nagni, the Stations of the Cross by Angelo Biancini, the statue of St Catherine of Siena by Antonio Berti and an angel in gesso by Duilio Cambellotti.

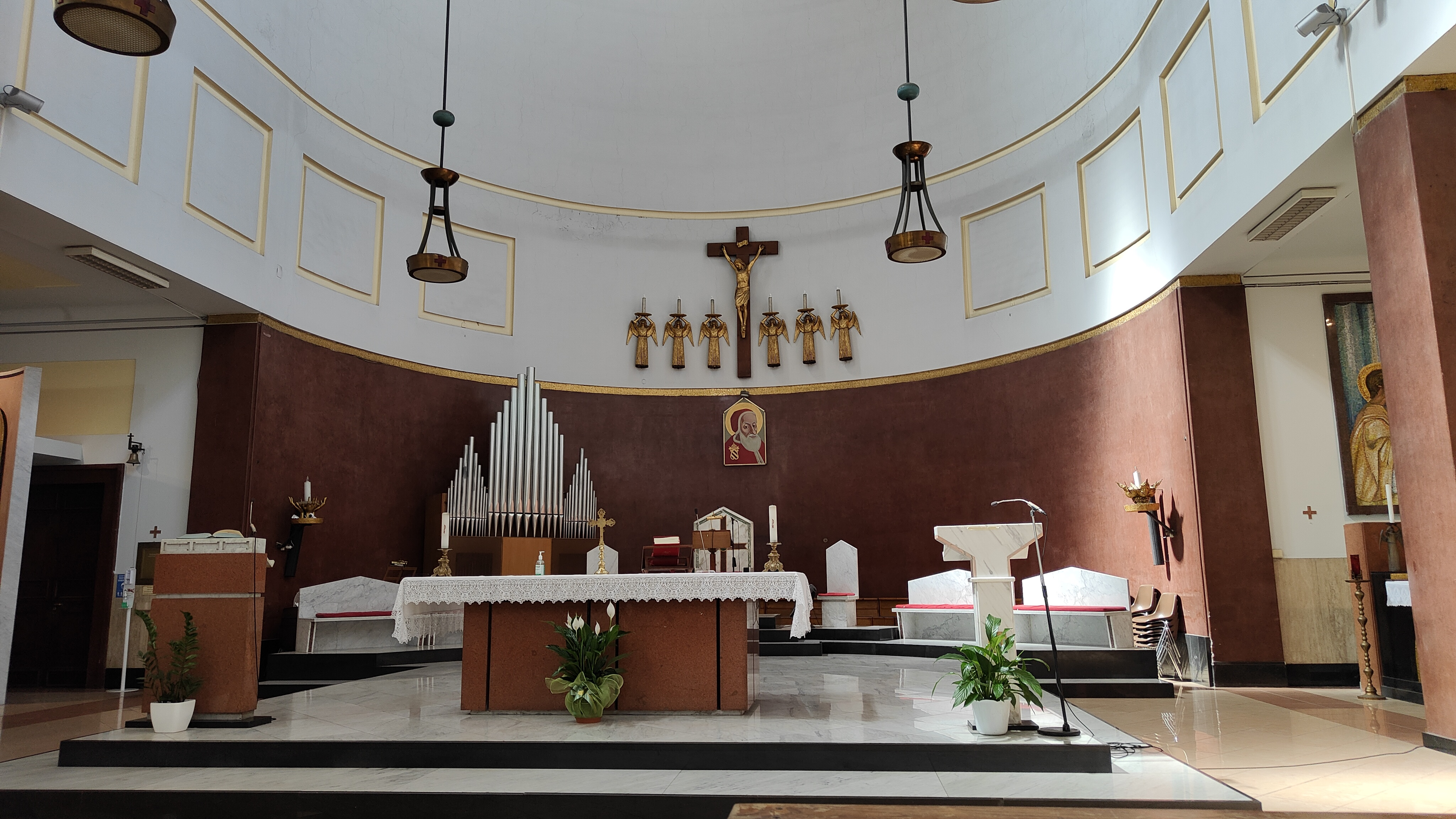
Altar of the Church of Saint Pope Pius V

== Titular Heads ==
- Paul-Pierre Philippe, O.P. † (France) (5 Mar 1973- 9 April 1984 Died)
- Luigi Dadaglio † (Italy) (25 May 1985- 22 August 1990 Died)
- Jose Tomas Sanchez of the Philippines † (28 Jun 1991- 9 March 2012 Died)
- James Michael Harvey (United States) (24 November 2012 – Present)
