= Pietro Parente =

Italian cardinal and theologian

His Eminence Pietro Parente
- Secretary Emeritus of the Congregation for the Doctrine of the Faith
- Church: Roman Catholic Church
- Appointed: 7 December 1965
- Term ended: 26 June 1967
- Predecessor: Alfredo Ottaviani
- Successor: Paul-Pierre Philippe
- Other post: Cardinal-Priest of San Lorenzo in Lucina (1967–1986)
- Previous posts: Archbishop of Perugia (1955–1959); Titular Archbishop of Ptolemais in Thebaide (1959–1965); Assessor of the Congregation of the Holy Office (1959–1965)

Orders
- Ordination: 18 March 1916
- Consecration: 23 October 1955 by Federico Tedeschini
- Created cardinal: 26 June 1967 by Pope Paul VI
- Rank: Cardinal-Priest

Personal details
- Born: Pietro Parente; 16 February 1891 Casalnuovo Monterotaro, Kingdom of Italy
- Died: 29 December 1986 (aged 95) Vatican City
- Education: Pontifical Lateran University; University of Naples
- Motto: Veritatem facientes in caritate

Styles of Pietro Parente
- Reference style: His Eminence
- Spoken style: Your Eminence
- Religious style: Cardinal
- Informal style: Cardinal
- See: Perugia

Pietro Parente (16 February 1891 in Casalnuovo Monterotaro, Italy – 29 December 1986 in Vatican City) was a long-serving theologian in the Holy Office of the Roman Catholic Church, and was made a cardinal on 26 June 1967. At his peak, he was regarded as one of the foremost Italian theologians.

== Life ==
Parente began his education at the Metropolitan seminary of Benevento in the 1900s and soon moved to Rome to study. His ability as a theologian was very well known even before he was ordained in 1916, and immediately after ordination he became a seminary rector in Naples, a role he was to hold for a decade, after which Parente transferred to the prestigious Pontifical Lateran University and briefly from 1934 to 1938 to the Pontifical Urbanian Athenaeum. Parente then went back to Naples to found the Faculty of Theology and Canon Law in his former seminary, and he was again rector from 1940 to 1955.

During this period of seminary teaching, Parente wrote frequently for the Vatican newspaper L’Osservatore Romano. He gained a reputation for his strongly worded, almost blunt, style of communicating official Church doctrine - something for which he is remembered by almost all those who studied under him. He was the first writer to use the term New Theology to describe the writings of Marie-Dominique Chenu and Louis Charlier in that paper in 1942, and was influential behind the encyclical Humani generis that condemned those theologians eight years later. He was the assessor of most of the cases done by the Holy Office during these years and knew Pope Pius XII personally.

== Bishop ==
Parente was archbishop of Perugia from 1955 to 1959, when Pope John XXIII made him one of the highest-ranking officials of the Holy Office. When this was renamed the Congregation for the Doctrine of the Faith in 1965, Parente became secretary, but he was viewed by Paul VI as too outspoken in personality to be given the job of prefect - which was given to the lesser-known but friendly and tactful Yugoslav Franjo Šeper. Parente was elevated to the cardinalate on 26 June 1967, ceasing thereupon to be Secretary of the Congregation, since that post, subordinate to that of Prefect, could not be held by a cardinal.

Although his knowledge and ability was still seen as very valuable in later years, Parente's days as one of the foremost theologians in the Vatican had largely gone by the time he became a cardinal. He was originally highly dubious about the Vatican rehabilitating Galileo during the Vatican Council, but was less opposed to it by the time Pope John Paul II officially did so in 1979, and he spoke at the age of 91 on the 1700th anniversary of the conversion of Armenia to Christianity in an effort to unite the Roman and Armenian Churches.

His age disqualified him from participating in the papal conclaves of 1978.

When he died in 1986, he was the oldest living cardinal, seven weeks shy of his ninety-sixth birthday.

Catholic Church titles
Preceded by Alfredo Ottaviani	Secretary of the Sacred Congregation for the Doctrine of the Faith; 7 December 1965 – 29 June 1967	Succeeded by Paul-Pierre Philippe
Records
Preceded by Carlos Vasconcellos	Oldest living Member of the Sacred College; 18 September 1982 – 29 December 1986	Succeeded by Julijans Vaivods
