= Eparchy of Lutsk and Ostroh (Ruthenian Uniate Church) =

Former eparchy of the Ukrainian Greek Catholic Church

The Eparchy of Lutsk and Ostroh (also known as "Lutsk and Ostroh of the Ukrainians" and in Latin as "Luceorien(sis) et Ostrogien(sis) Ruthenorum") was an eparchy in the Ruthenian Uniate Church (1594–1636, 1702-1795 and 1789–1839). It was a suffragan eparchy (equivalent to a diocese in the Latin Rite) of the Metropolis of Kiev, Galicia and all Ruthenia. It was situated in the Polish–Lithuanian Commonwealth. Today, the territory of the eparchy is located in the north-western part of the modern state of Ukraine; it encompassed the oblasts (provinces) of Volyn Oblast and Rivne Oblast. From 1921 to 1973, the eparchy was a titular see of the Eastern Catholic Church.

Remarkably, its Latin title always called it 'Ruthenian', which is now a distinct Byzantine rite Eastern Catholic (then 'Uniate') particular church sui iuris.

In the Ukrainian Greek Catholic Church — the successor to the Ruthenian Unite Church, the current exarchate of Lutsk may be considered to be the successor of the eparchy. As an exarchate, it only has a pre-diocesan rank. It was erected in 2008 on territory split from the metropolitan Major Archeparchy of Kyiv–Galicia.

== History ==
- The see joined the Union of Brest on 2 February 1594. It did not have a Latin precursor.
- It was suppressed in 1636 by King of Poland Władysław IV Vasa and the eparchy was 'returned' to the Orthodox community. As a result, the remaining Uniate parishes and several monasteries were administered by the Archimandrite of the Zhydychyn Saint Nicholas's Monastery.
- It was restored in 1702.
- It was again suppressed again in 1795, without a direct Catholic successor.
- It was again restored on 18 November 1798.
- It was suppressed for the final time on 14 March 1839 without a direct Catholic successor.

== List of eparchs ==
Suffragan Eparchs (Bishops) of Lutsk–Ostroh (incomplete first decades?)

- Cyril Terlecki (1594.05.02 – death 1608)
- Eustachy Maliński (1609 – death 1621)
- Jeremiasz Poczapowski (1621? – death 1636.10.15). He was forced to yield the see to the Orthodox bishop A. Puzyna in 1633.
- See suppressed 1636-1702
- Dionizy Żabokrzycki (1702 – death 1714) In 1695, he was nominated by King John III Sobieski as the Orthodox bishop of Lutsk–Ostroh. However, in 1702 he joined the Uniate church. He was re-consecrated by Metropolitan Lev Zalenskyj. Tsar Peter I had him arrested and exiled in 1709. He died in prison in Moscow in 1714.
- Cyryl Szumlański (1715 – death 1715)
- Józef Wyhowski (1716 – death 1730)
- Teodozy Rudnicki-Lubieniecki (1731 – death 1751)
- Stefan Sylwester Rudnicki-Lubieniecki (1752 – death 1777)
- Cyprian Stecki (1777.05.12 – death 1787.01.05)
- Michał Mateusz Konstanty Stadnicki (1787.01.05 – 1795), death 1797.06.26;
- See suppressed 1795-78
- Stefan Lewiński (1797.06.26 – death 1806.01.23);
- Hryhorij Koxanovyc (Grzegorz Kochanowicz) (1807 – 1814);
- Jakub Martusiewicz (1817 – 1826);
- Archbishop-bishop Ivan Krasovskyj (1826 – 1827.08.23); previously Archeparch of Polatsk–Vitebsk (1809.09.22 – 1826)
- See suppressed 1839

Orthodox bishops in the 17th century included Dionysius Balaban (1655–1657) and Gedeon Chetvertinsky (1660–1684)..

== Titular see ==
In 1921, the eparchy was restored as a titular see. In 1973 it was suppressed, having had only two incumbents :

- Blessed Bishop Vasyl VeIyčkovskyj, Redemptorists (C.SS.R.) (1959 – death 1973.06.30) as Auxiliary Bishop of the Metropolitan Archeparchy Lviv of the Ukrainians (Ukraine) (1959 – 1973.06.30)
- Josyf Botsian (1921.02.24 – death 1926.11.21), also as Auxiliary Bishop of Lviv of the Ukrainians (1924.09.20 – 1926.11.21).

== See also ==
- List of Catholic dioceses in Ukraine
- Ukrainian Catholic Archiepiscopal Exarchate of Lutsk

== Sources and external links ==
- GCatholic.org - data for all sections
- Lutsk eparchy at Encyclopedia of Ukraine
