= Diocese of Lodomeria =

The Diocese of Lodomeria was a late-medieval Latin rite Catholic diocese in Lodomeria (roughly Volhynia, in modern Ukraine) from 1375 till 1425. Lodomeria is a derivative of Wolodomeria based in Volodymyr. The diocese preceded Roman Catholic Diocese of Lutsk which was formed on its territory. In 1425 the diocese of Lodomeria was merged with its former junior diocese moving its bishop see to Lutsk by Andrzej Spławski.

== History ==
- Established in 1375 as Diocese of Lodomeria (Latin) / Włodzimierz (Polish) / Volodymyr (Ukrainian), on territory split off from the Roman Catholic Diocese of Halyč.
- Lost territory in 1404 to establish the Diocese of Luceoria / Luck (Polish) / Lutsk
- Suppressed on 1425.12.19, its territory being merged into the Diocese of Luck and Włodzimierz.

== Episcopal ordinaries ==
(all Roman Rite)

Suffragan Bishops of Lodomeria

- Mikołaj (1380 – retired 1400.02.17), emeritate as Titular Bishop of Selymbria (1400.02.17 – ?death ?)
- Zbigniew z Łapanowa (1400 – 1413.08.20), next Bishop of Kamyanets-Podilsky (Ukraine) (1413.08.20 – death 1428)
- Jarosław z Lublina, Dominican Order (O.P.) (1414.04.30 – ?).

== See also ==
- Ukrainian Catholic Apostolic Exarchate of Volhynia, Polesia and Pidliashia (overlapping territory but Byzantine Rite)
- List of Catholic dioceses in Ukraine

== Sources and references ==
- GCatholic with Google map - data for all sections
