= Angelo Felici =

Italian cardinal

His Eminence Angelo Felici
- President Emeritus of the Pontifical Commission Ecclesia Dei
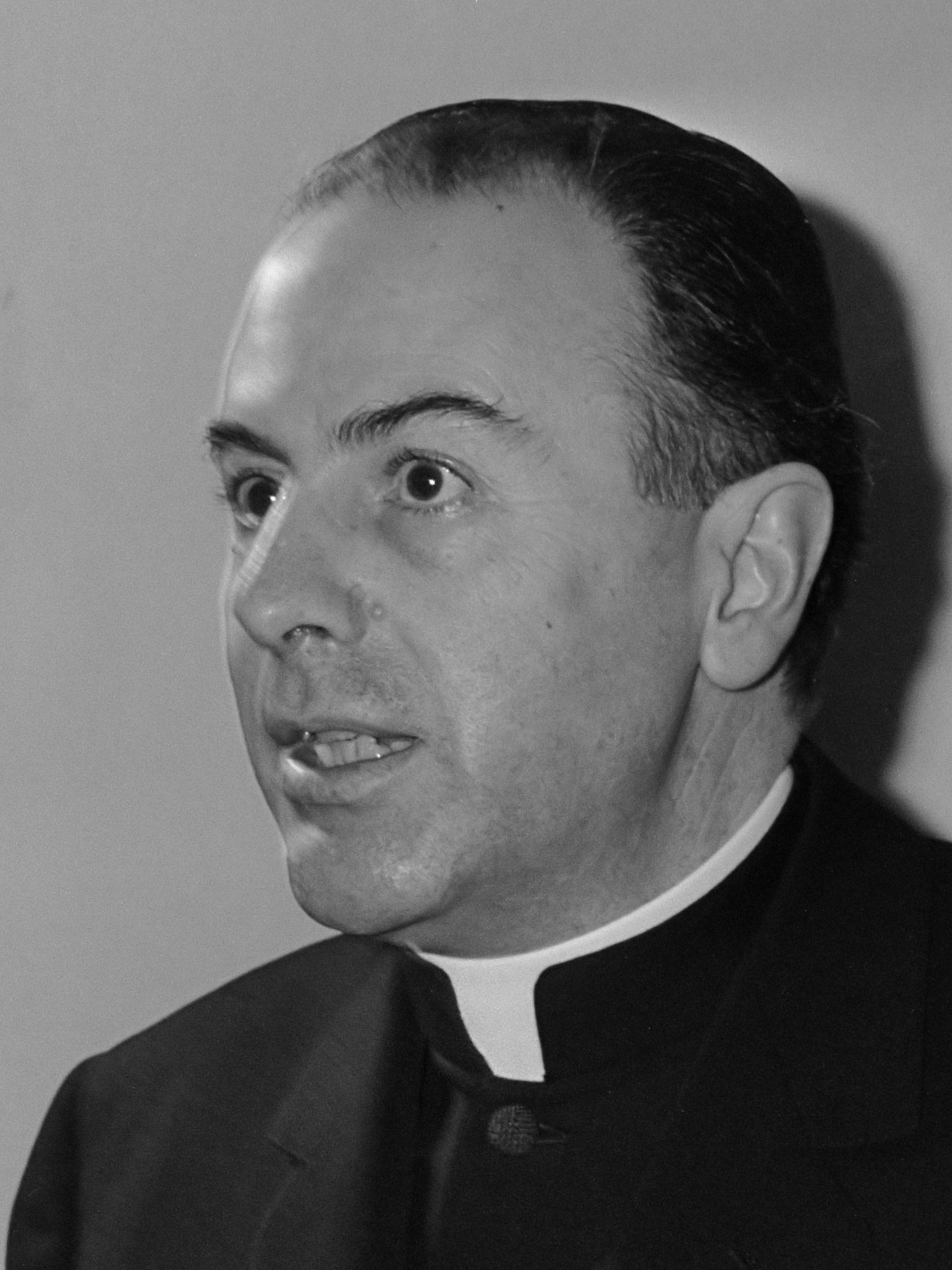
- Felici in 1973.
- Church: Roman Catholic Church
- Appointed: 16 December 1995
- Term ended: 13 April 2000
- Predecessor: Antonio Innocenti
- Successor: Darío Castrillón Hoyos
- Other post: Cardinal-Priest of Santi Biagio e Carlo ai Catinari "pro hac vice" (1999–2007)
- Previous posts: Undersecretary of the Congregation for Extraordinary Ecclesiastical Affairs (1964–67); Apostolic Pro-Nuncio to the Netherlands (1967–76); Titular Archbishop of Caesariana (1967–88); Apostolic Nuncio to Portugal (1976–79); Apostolic Nuncio to France (1979–88); Cardinal-Deacon of Santi Biagio e Carlo ai Catinari (1988–99); Prefect of the Congregation for the Causes of Saints (1988–95)

Orders
- Ordination: 4 April 1942
- Consecration: 24 September 1967 by Amleto Giovanni Cicognani
- Created cardinal: 28 June 1988 by Pope John Paul II
- Rank: Cardinal-Deacon (1988–99); Cardinal-Priest (1999–2007)

Personal details
- Born: Angelo Felici; 26 July 1919 Segni, Kingdom of Italy
- Died: 17 June 2007 (aged 87) Rome, Italy
- Education: Pontifical Ecclesiastical Academy; Pontifical Lateran University; Pontifical Gregorian University
- Motto: In lumine Tuo
- Coat of arms

Styles of Angelo Felici
- Reference style: His Eminence
- Spoken style: Your Eminence
- Informal style: Cardinal
- See: Caesariana

Angelo Felici J.C.D. (26 July 1919, Segni – 17 June 2007, Rome) was an Italian Cardinal in the Roman Catholic Church and President of the Pontifical Commission Ecclesia Dei. Before this role he served as the Prefect of the Congregation for the Causes of Saints from 1988 to 1995.

== Early life ==
He was ordained on 4 April 1942 and spent the next three years studying for his doctorate in canon law. In 1945, he joined the Vatican Secretariat of State, where he worked until 1949. He was a faculty member at the Pontifical Ecclesiastical Academy, until he was appointed under-secretary of the Congregation for Extraordinary Ecclesiastical Affairs in 1964.

== Episcopate ==
Pope Paul sent him on a mission to Jerusalem after the Six-Day War between Arabs and Israelis. Pope Paul VI appointed him as titular archbishop of Caesariana and appointed pro-nuncio to the Netherlands on 22 July 1967. He was consecrated as a bishop in September of the same year. His nine years in the Netherlands were known for their sharp conflicts with the more radical progessivist elements Dutch Catholic Church, among other things on the issue of clerical celibacy and the nominations of two bishop's nominations who supported the Vatican line contrary to Dutch progressivists (Adrianus Johannes Simonis and Joannes Gijsen). He was transferred to Portugal in 1976 and finally to France in 1979.

== Cardinalate ==
He was made Cardinal-Deacon of Santi Biagio e Carlo ai Catinari in the consistory of 28 June 1988 by Pope John Paul II. In 1988, he was appointed Prefect of the Congregation for the Causes of Saints, where he served until 1995. Then, he was appointed President of the Pontifical Commission Ecclesia Dei. As Cardinal Deacons are permitted to do after ten years, he opted for the order of cardinal priests and his titular church was elevated pro hac vice to the rank of title on 9 January 1999. He lost the right to participate in a conclave when he turned 80 years of age, in 1999.

== Death ==
On 17 June 2007, Cardinal Felici died; Pope Benedict XVI sent his condolences and, on 19 June 2007, presided at Cardinal Felici's funeral Mass at the Altar of the Cathedra in Saint Peter's Basilica in the Vatican.

Catholic Church titles
Preceded by Fulton J. Sheen	— TITULAR — Bishop of Caesariana; 1967–1988	Succeeded by Giovanni Lajolo
Preceded by Pietro Palazzini	Prefect of the Congregation for the Causes of Saints; 1 July 1988 – 13 June 1995	Succeeded by Alberto Bovone
Preceded by Antonio Innocenti	President of the Pontifical; Commission Ecclesia Dei; 16 December 1995 – 13 April 2000	Succeeded by Darío Castrillón Hoyos
Records
Preceded by Cardinal Johannes Willebrands	Oldest living Member of the Sacred College; 2 August 2006 – 11 June 2007	Succeeded by Cardinal Édouard Gagnon
