= Jose Tomas Sanchez =

Filipino Archbishop and Cardinal (1929–2012)

His Eminence José Tomás Sánchez
- Former Prefect of the Congregation for the Clergy
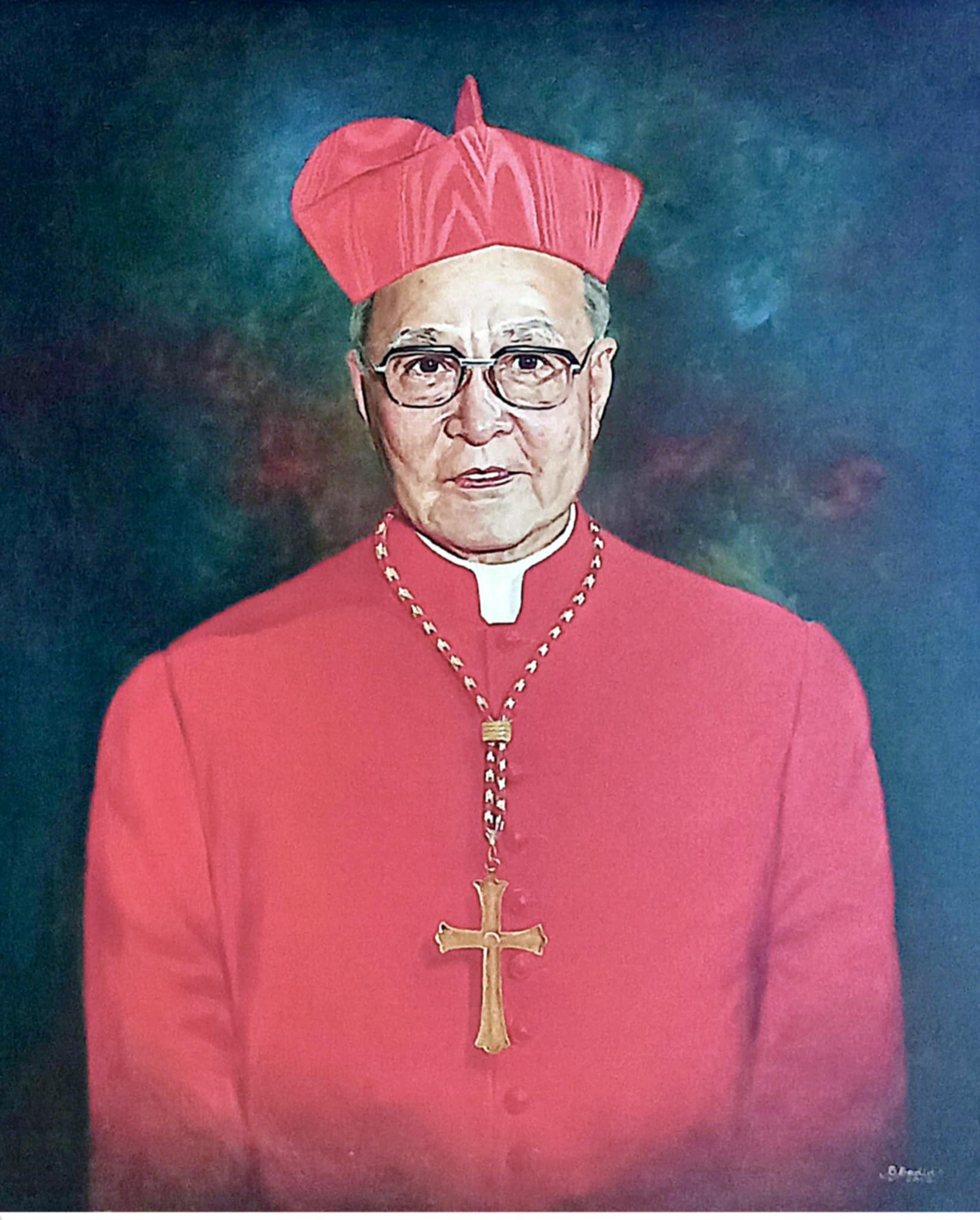
- Portrait of Jose Cardinal Sanchez. From the Pontificio Collegio Filippino collection.
- Province: Nueva Segovia
- See: Nueva Segovia
- Installed: July 1, 1991
- Term ended: June 15, 1996 (Retired)
- Predecessor: Antonio Innocenti †
- Successor: Dario Castrillon Hoyos
- Other posts: Bishop of Lucena; Archbishop of Nueva Segovia; Cardinal-Deacon of San Pio V a Villa Carpegna; Cardinal-Priest of San Pio V a Villa Carpegna

Orders
- Ordination: May 12, 1946
- Consecration: May 12, 1968 by Carmine Rocco
- Created cardinal: June 28, 1991 by Pope John Paul II
- Rank: Cardinal-Priest

Personal details
- Born: March 17, 1920 Pandan, Catanduanes, Philippine Islands
- Died: March 9, 2012 (aged 91) Manila, Philippines
- Buried: Virac Cathedral, Virac, Catanduanes
- Denomination: Roman Catholic
- Motto: "Doce me facere voluntatem" ("Teach to do thy will")
- Coat of arms

Styles of Jose Tomas Sanchez
- Reference style: His Eminence
- Spoken style: Your Eminence
- Religious style: Monsignor
- Informal style: Cardinal
- See: Nueva Segovia

José Tomás Sánchez (March 17, 1920 – March 9, 2012) was a Filipino Catholic prelate who served as prefect of the Congregation for the Clergy from 1991 to 1996. He previously held several diocesan bishop positions in the Philippines, the last of which was Archbishop of Nueva Segovia from 1982 to 1986.

He was ordained a priest on May 12, 1946, and consecrated bishop on May 12, 1968, following his appointment as Auxiliary Bishop of Cáceres. He was elevated to cardinal on June 28, 1991, by Pope John Paul II.

== Early life and education ==
Sánchez was born in Pandan in the island-province of Catanduanes. He was the eighth of ten children born to Patricio Sánchez and Paz Tomás, who was said to be of Spanish descent.

He attended the Holy Rosary Seminary (then named Seminario del Santísimo Rosario) in Naga City, and afterwards obtained his doctorate in theology at the University of Santo Tomás of Manila.

== Early priesthood ==
After an early ambition to become an engineer, Sánchez almost did not enter the priesthood when Imperial Japan temporarily closed the seminary during the Second World War; his friends from the seminary encouraged him to continue his studies. Sanchez was ordained on May 12, 1946, as a priest from Sorsogon, where he was asked to teach at the Peñafrancia Seminary. According to him, he taught Latin, Spanish and, because no one else could ably teach the subjects, Geometry and Algebra. He was appointed Auxiliary Bishop of Nueva Caceres on February 5, 1968, at 47 years old, and became Titular Bishop of Lesvi.

== Episcopacy ==
=== Bishop of Lucena ===
On December 13, 1971, he was appointed Coadjutor Bishop of Lucena with the right to succeed as Bishop of Lucena upon the see's vacancy, which he did on September 25, 1976, at age 56.

=== Archbishop of Nueva Segovia ===
On June 12, 1982, he was appointed by Pope John Paul II as Archbishop of Nueva Segovia, succeeding Most Rev. Juan C. Sison. He resigned from the seat on March 22, 1986, due to his appointment to the Roman Curia as Secretary of the Congregation for the Evangelization of Peoples.

=== Roman Curia and cardinalate ===
On October 30, 1985, he was appointed to the Roman Curia as Secretary of the Congregation for the Evangelization of Peoples. On June 28, 1991, he was elevated by Pope John Paul II to the College of Cardinals as Cardinal-Deacon of San Pio V a Villa Carpegna. On July 1, 1991, he was also appointed Prefect of the Congregation for the Clergy and President of the Administration of the Patrimony of the Apostolic See. He retired as Prefect on June 15, 1996. He was elevated to Cardinal-Priest after 10 years on February 26, 2002.

== Return to the Philippines and death ==
Sánchez returned to the Philippines in December 2010, ostensibly to fight the Reproductive Health Bill, which he believed will destroy the Filipino family due to the promotion of extramarital sex and premarital sex that comes with the distribution of contraceptives.

"His constant prayer was that Europe’s loss of its Christian faith would never happen in the Philippines," wrote former Senator Francisco Tatad. "And he would contribute his last strength to the fight of the Filipino family against the international reproductive health lobby, which has destroyed the family and killed the Christian faith in many parts of the world."

Cardinal Sánchez died on March 9, 2012, at the age of 91 due to multiple organ failure and 8 days before his 92nd birthday. He was the longest-living Filipino Cardinal, until August 2024, when Cardinal Gaudencio Rosales turned 92 on August 10, making Sanchez the second longest-lived Filipino Cardinal.

Catholic Church titles
Preceded by Alfredo Obviar	Bishop of Lucena; 25 September 1976 – 12 January 1982	Succeeded by Ruben T. Profugo
Preceded by Juan C. Sison	Archbishop of Nueva Segovia; 12 January 1982 – 22 March 1986	Succeeded by Orlando Beltran Quevedo
Preceded by Antonio Innocenti	Prefect of the Congregation for the Clergy; July 1991 – June 1996	Succeeded by Darío Castrillón Hoyos
Preceded by Luigi Dadaglio	Cardinal-Priest of S. Pio V a Villa Carpegna (Previously a Cardinal-Deacon); 1991–2012	Succeeded by James Michael Harvey
