= Antonio Innocenti =

Italian cardinal

His Eminence Antonio Innocenti
- President Emeritus of the Pontifical Commission Ecclesia Dei
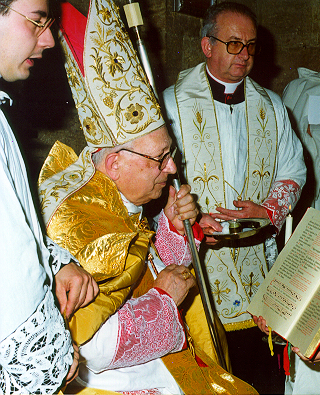
- Church: Roman Catholic Church
- Appointed: 1 July 1991
- Term ended: 16 December 1995
- Predecessor: Paul Augustin Mayer
- Successor: Angelo Felici
- Other post: Cardinal-Priest of Santa Maria in Aquiro pro hac vice (1996–2008)
- Previous posts: Apostolic Nuncio to Paraguay (1967–73); Titular Archbishop of Eclano (1967–85); Secretary of the Congregation for Sacramental Discipline (1973–75); Secretary of the Congregation for Sacraments and Divine Worship (1975–80); Apostolic Nuncio to Spain (1980–85); Cardinal-Deacon of Santa Maria in Aquiro (1985–96); Prefect of the Congregation for the Clergy (1986–91); President of the Pontifical Commission for Preserving the Church's Patrimony of Art and History (1988–91)

Orders
- Ordination: 17 July 1938 by Giovanni Giorgis
- Consecration: 18 February 1968 by Amleto Giovanni Cicognani
- Created cardinal: 25 May 1985 by Pope John Paul II
- Rank: Cardinal-Deacon (1985–96); Cardinal-Priest (1996–2008)

Personal details
- Born: Antonio Innocenti; 23 August 1915 Poppi, Fiesole, Kingdom of Italy
- Died: 6 September 2008 (aged 93) Piazza della Città Leonina 9, Vatican City
- Education: Pontifical Gregorian University; Pontifical Lateran University; Pontifical Ecclesiastical Academy
- Motto: Lucet spero fide

Styles of Antonio Innocenti
- Reference style: His Eminence
- Spoken style: Your Eminence
- Religious style: Cardinal
- Informal style: Cardinal
- See: Aeclanum (titular see)

Antonio Innocenti (23 August 1915 – 6 September 2008) was an Italian cardinal who was a leading figure in the Roman Curia and the Vatican diplomatic service for many years.

== Biography ==
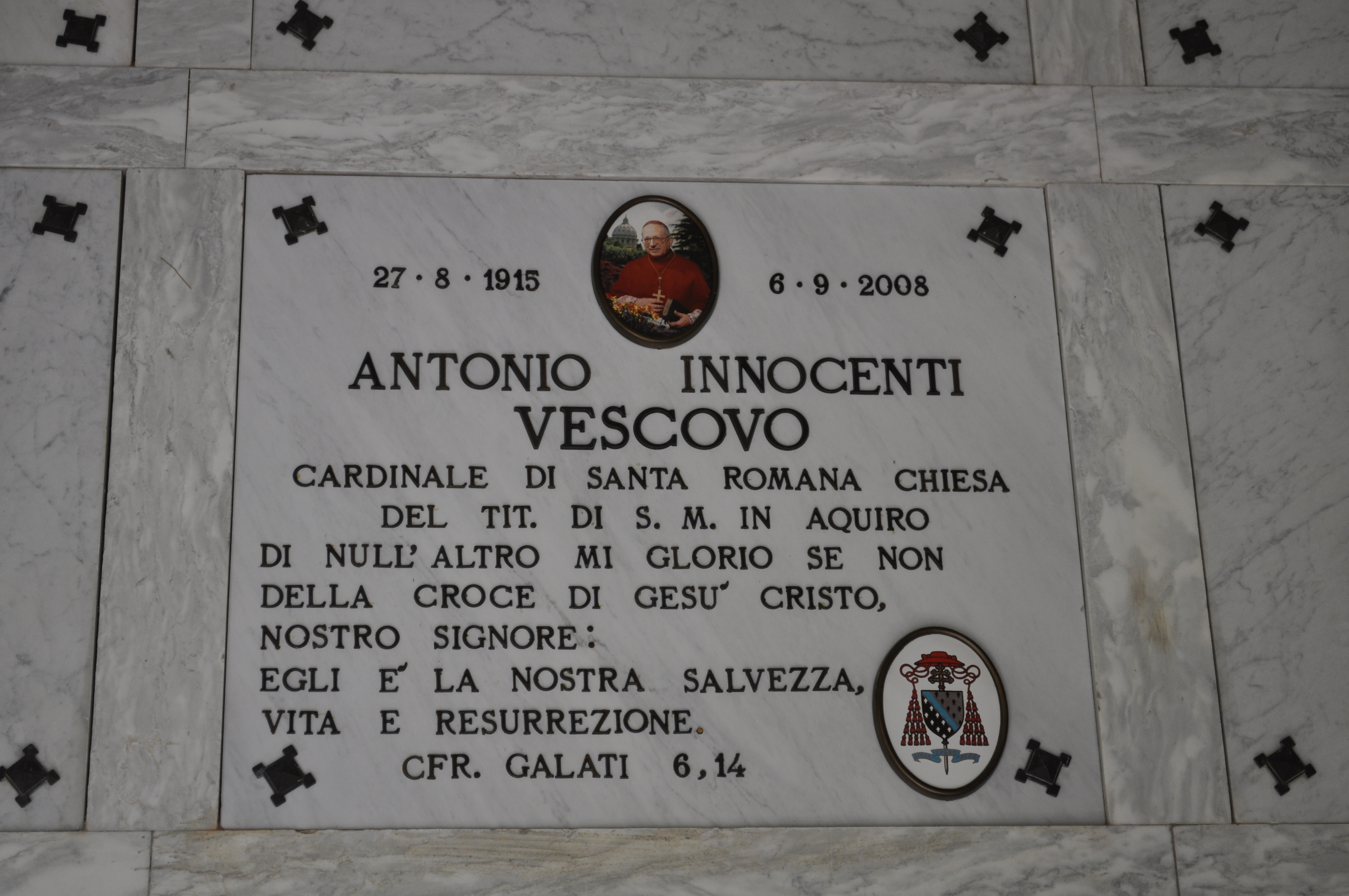
Cardinal Innocenti's grave in Tosi.

He was born at Poppi, Italy. Ordained in 1938 at Florence, Innocenti was studied at the Diocesan Seminary of Fiesole, the Pontifical Gregorian University where he received a doctorate in 1941, the Pontifical Lateran University, where he received a licentiate in dogmatic theology in 1950, and the Pontifical Ecclesiastical Academy, where he studied diplomacy. He served as a priest in northern Italy for the decade following his ordination. His work helping Jews led to his arrest and almost being shot by a firing squad; he was released at the last minute. He was then called to Rome by Pope Pius XII and settled on a career in the Curia. He served for most of the 1950s and 1960s in the Papal Nunciature in Switzerland, where, as he saw it, the major problems were "an opulent society, religious assistance to immigrants and relations with Christian of other denominations".

On 15 December 1967, Pope Paul VI named him Titular Archbishop of Eclano and Apostolic Nuncio to Paraguay. He was appointed Secretary of the Congregation for the Discipline of the Sacraments (now the Congregation for Divine Worship) until 1980, when he became Nuncio to Spain.

In 1985, Pope John Paul II made him a cardinal, and on 9 January 1986 appointed him Prefect of the Congregation for the Clergy, a post he held until his retirement in 1991. During Innocenti's time as Prefect, the Curia was extremely busy dealing with what was perceived as dangerous dissent from papal teaching, and Innocenti was heavily involved with many lay movements designed to restore orthodoxy among the Church's members.

By 1999, he had retired to Piazza della Citta Leonina.

Catholic Church titles
Preceded by Luigi Dadaglio	Apostolic Nuncio to Spain; 4 October 1980 – 9 January 1986	Succeeded by Mario Tagliaferri
Preceded by Silvio Oddi	Prefect for the Congregation for the Clergy; 1986–1991	Succeeded by José Tomás Sánchez
Preceded by Paul Mayer	President of the Pontifical Commission Ecclesia Dei; 1991–1995	Succeeded by Angelo Felici
