= Santa Maria Liberatrice a Monte Testaccio =

- Church of Saint Mary Liberatrix on Monte Testaccio
- Chiesa di Santa Maria Liberatrice a Monte Testaccio
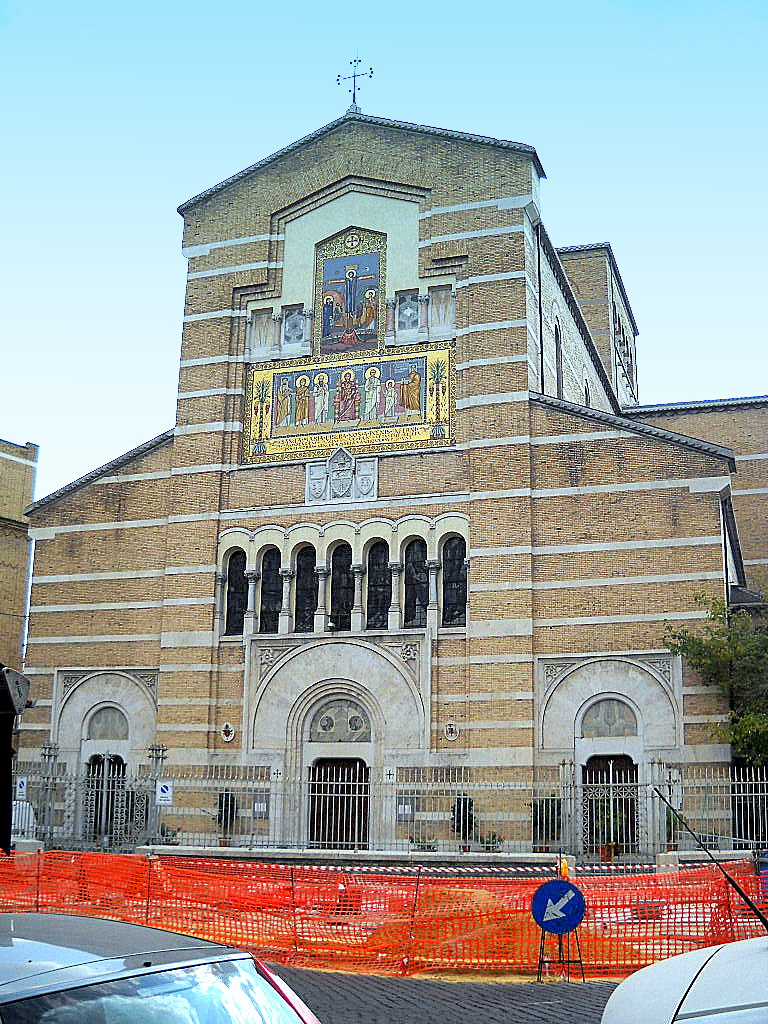
- Facade
- Click on the map for a fullscreen view
- 41°52′45″N 12°28′26″E
- Location: Via Lorenzo Ghiberti 2, Testaccio, Rome
- Country: Italy
- Language: Italian
- Denomination: Catholic
- Tradition: Roman Rite
- Religious order: Salesians, Oblates of St. Frances of Rome
- Website: santamarialiberatrice.com

History
- Status: titular church, parish church
- Dedication: Mary, mother of Jesus (as Liberatrix)
- Consecrated: 1908

Architecture
- Functional status: active
- Architect: Mario Ceradini
- Architectural type: Romanesque Revival, Byzantine Revival
- Completed: 1908

Administration
- Diocese: Rome

Santa Maria Liberatrice a Monte Testaccio is a 20th-century parochial church and titular church on the Monte Testaccio in Rome, dedicated to Mary, mother of Jesus.

== History ==
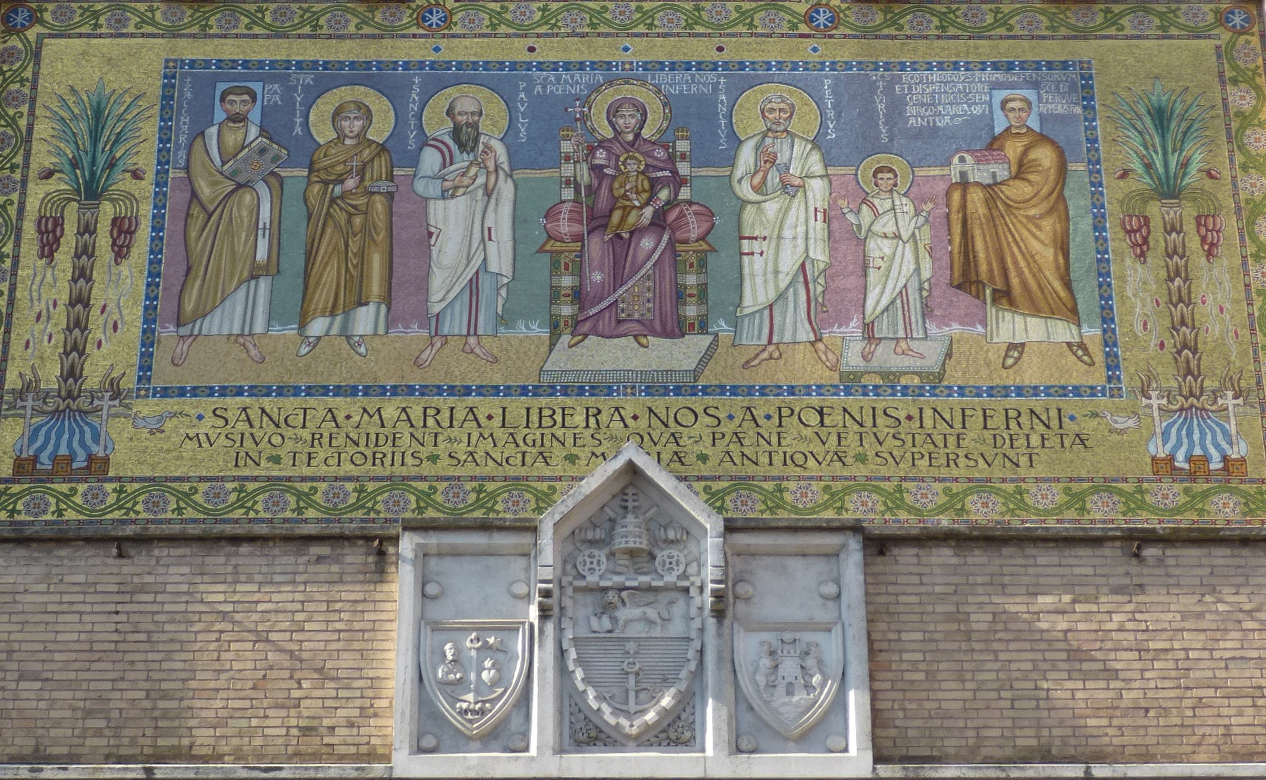
Mosaic on facade; it depicts Pope Zachary, Saint Julitta, Saint Paul, Mary and Jesus, Saint Peter, Saint Cyricus and Pope Theodore I. This image reproduces frescos from the Cappella di Teodoto, of Santa Maria Antiqua.

Santa Maria Liberatrice a Monte Testaccio was built in 1908 to serve the new suburb at Monte Testaccio, and put in the care of the Salesian Order and the Oblates of St. Frances of Rome. It took its title and much of its artwork from the old church of Santa Maria Liberatrice in the Forum.

On 5 February 1965, it was made a titular church to be held by a cardinal-deacon.

Cardinal-Protectors

- Giuseppe Beltrami (1967–1973); cardinal-priest pro hac vice
- Opilio Rossi (1976–1987)
- Antonio María Javierre Ortas (1988–2007); promoted to cardinal-priest pro hac vice in 1999
- Giovanni Lajolo (2007–present); promoted to cardinal-priest pro hac vice in 2018
