= Antonio María Javierre Ortas =

Roman Catholic Cardinal

His Eminence Antonio María Javierre Ortas S.D.B.
- Prefect Emeritus of the Congregation for Divine Worship and the Discipline of the Sacraments
- Church: Roman Catholic Church
- Appointed: 24 January 1992
- Term ended: 21 June 1996
- Predecessor: Eduardo Martínez Somalo
- Successor: Jorge Arturo Medina Estévez
- Other post: Cardinal-Priest of Santa Maria Liberatrice a Monte Testaccio (1999–2007) (Note: Held this church as a diaconate since 1988 but became a Cardinal-Priest in 1999. It is due to this that he held this diaconate as a titular church from the moment he became a Cardinal-Priest and is reflected like a different appointment rather than the same one.)
- Previous posts: Rector Magnificus of the Salesian Pontifical University (1971–74); Secretary of the Congregation for Catholic Education (1976–88); Titular Archbishop of Meta (1976–88); Cardinal-Deacon of Santa Maria Liberatrice a Monte Testaccio (1988–99); Archivist of the Vatican Secret Archives (1988–92); Librarian of the Vatican Apostolic Library (1988–92)

Orders
- Ordination: 24 April 1949
- Consecration: 29 June 1976 by Vicente Enrique y Tarancón
- Created cardinal: 28 June 1988 by Pope John Paul II
- Rank: Cardinal-Deacon (1988–99); Cardinal-Priest (1999–2007)

Personal details
- Born: Antonio María Javierre Ortas; 21 February 1921 Siétamo, Spain
- Died: 1 February 2007 (aged 85) Rome, Italy
- Motto: Ego vobiscum sum

Antonio María Javierre Ortas S.D.B. (21 February 1921 – 1 February 2007) was a cardinal of the Catholic Church, and former prefect of the Congregation for Divine Worship and the Discipline of the Sacraments in the Vatican.

Javierre Ortas was born in Siétamo, Spain. He was ordained in 1949 and took his doctorate in theology in Louvain. For many years he lectured in fundamental theology and dogmatics in places such as Turin, Rome, Peru, Guatemala and Poland. During the Second Vatican Council he was a spokesman for the Spanish bishops in ecumenical questions.

In 1976 Pope Paul VI made him archbishop and secretary of the Congregation for Catholic Education. He became cardinal deacon in 1988, as well as the librarian and archivist of the Holy Roman Church. In 1992 he was elevated to cardinal priest and prefect for the Congregation for Divine Worship and the Discipline of the Sacraments, positions he kept until 1996. He died in 2007 in Rome.

In 1992, he participated in the decision to allow female altar servers in the Church. In 1994, Cardinal Javierre Ortas advising that women were permitted to serve at the discretion of the local bishop.

Preceded by Alfons Maria Stickler	Librarian of the Holy Roman Church and Archivist of the Holy Roman Church; 1988–1992	Succeeded by Luigi Poggi
Preceded by Eduardo Martínez Somalo	Prefect of the Congregation for Divine Worship and the Discipline of the Sacraments; 1992–1996	Succeeded by Jorge Medina Estévez
