= Paul-Pierre Philippe =

His Eminence Paul-Pierre Philippe O.P.
- Patron of the Order of Malta
- Church: Roman Catholic Church
- Appointed: 10 November 1978
- Term ended: 9 April 1984
- Predecessor: Giacomo Violardo
- Successor: Sebastiano Baggio
- Other post: Cardinal-Priest of San Pio V a Villa Carpegna pro hac vice (1983–84)
- Previous posts: Commissary of the Congregation of the Holy Office (1955–59); Secretary of the Congregation for Religious (1959–67); Titular Archbishop of Heracleopolis magna (1962–73); Secretary of the Congregation for the Doctrine of the Faith (1967–73); Cardinal-Deacon of San Pio V a Villa Carpegna (1973–83); Prefect of the Congregation for the Oriental Churches (1973–80)

Orders
- Ordination: 6 July 1932 by Benjamin-Octave Roland-Gosselin
- Consecration: 21 September 1962 by Pope John XXIII
- Created cardinal: 5 March 1973 by Pope Paul VI
- Rank: Cardinal-Deacon (1973–83); Cardinal-Priest (1983–84)

Personal details
- Born: Pierre-Charles Philippe; 16 April 1905 Paris, French Third Republic
- Died: 9 April 1984 (aged 79) Rome, Italy
- Buried: Campo Verano
- Parents: Louis Henri Philippe; Gabrielle Adam
- Motto: Voluntatem Dei ex animo
- Coat of arms

Styles of Paul-Pierre Philippe
- Reference style: His Eminence
- Spoken style: Your Eminence
- Religious style: Cardinal
- Informal style: Cardinal
- See: Erocleopoli Maggiore (titular see)

Paul-Pierre Philippe (16 April 1905 – 9 April 1984) O.P. was a Cardinal and Prefect of the Congregation for the Oriental Churches in the Roman Catholic Church.

== Early life ==
He joined the Dominican Order in Paris in 1926 and was ordained on 6 July 1932. He was a faculty member of the Pontifical Athenaeum Angelicum, the future Pontifical University of St. Thomas Aquinas (Angelicum) in Rome from 1935 until 1939. During the war he served as an officer in the French Army. After the war he returned to Rome to teach until 1950.

== Archbishop and Cardinal ==
Pope John XXIII appointed him titular Archbishop of Erocleopoli Maggiore on 28 August 1962 and he was consecrated on 21 September of that year at the hands of Pope John. He attended the Second Vatican Council. He was appointed Secretary of the Congregation for Religious on 14 December 1959.

He would remain secretary of the congregation until 28 June 1967, when he was appointed Secretary of the Congregation for the Doctrine of the Faith. He was created and proclaimed Cardinal-Deacon of S. Pio V a Villa on 5 March 1973. Pope Paul VI appointed him Prefect of the Congregation for the Oriental Churches the next day. He opted for the order of cardinal priests and his deaconry was elevated pro hac vice to title on 2 February 1983 after being ten years as a cardinal deacon.

== Bibliography ==
- The Blessed Virgin and the priesthood. Chicago: Regnery, 1955.
- De Contemplatione Mystica in Historia. Romae: Angelicum, 1955.
- The Ends of the Religious Life according to Saint Thomas Aquinas. Athens: Fraternity of the Blessed Virgin Mary, 1962.
- The novitiate. Notre Dame: University of Notre Dame Press, 1961.
- Principles for a Renewal of Religious Life : General Assembly of 1963. Ottawa: Canadian Religious Conference, 1964.
- Le rôle de l'amitié dans la vie chrétienne selon saint Thomas d'Aquin. Rome: Angelicum, 1938.

Catholic Church titles
Preceded by Pietro Parente	Secretary of the Congregation for he Doctrine of the Faith; 29 June 1967 – 6 March 1973	Succeeded by Jean Jérôme Hamer
Preceded by Maximilien de Furstenberg	Prefect of the Congregation for the Oriental Churches; 6 March 1973 – 27 June 1980	Succeeded by Wladyslaw Rubin
