= James Michael Harvey =

American Catholic cardinal (born 1949)

His Eminence James Michael Harvey
- Archpriest of the Basilica of Saint Paul Outside the Walls; Cardinal-Priest of San Pio V a Villa Carpegna
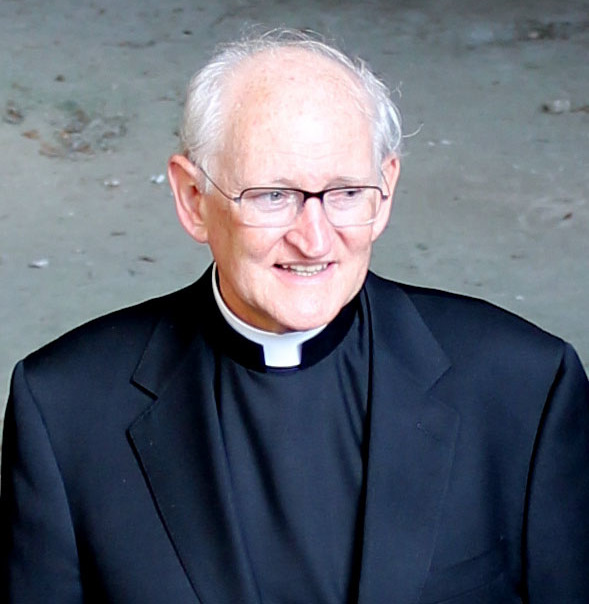
- Harvey in 2013
- Church: Catholic Church; Latin Church
- See: Basilica of Saint Paul Outside the Walls
- Appointed: November 23, 2012
- Predecessor: Francesco Monterisi
- Previous posts: Prefect of the Prefecture of the Papal Household (1998‍–‍2012); Titular Archbishop of Memphis (2003‍–‍2012); Titular Bishop of Memphis (1998‍–‍2003)

Orders
- Ordination: June 29, 1975 by Pope Paul VI
- Consecration: March 19, 1998 by Pope John Paul II
- Created cardinal: November 24, 2012 by Pope Benedict XVI
- Rank: Cardinal-Deacon (2012–2024); Cardinal-Priest (2024–)

Personal details
- Born: October 20, 1949 (age 76) Milwaukee, Wisconsin, US
- Education: North American College; Pontifical Ecclesiastical Academy
- Motto: Zelus Domus Tuæ (Latin for 'Zeal for the Lord’s house')
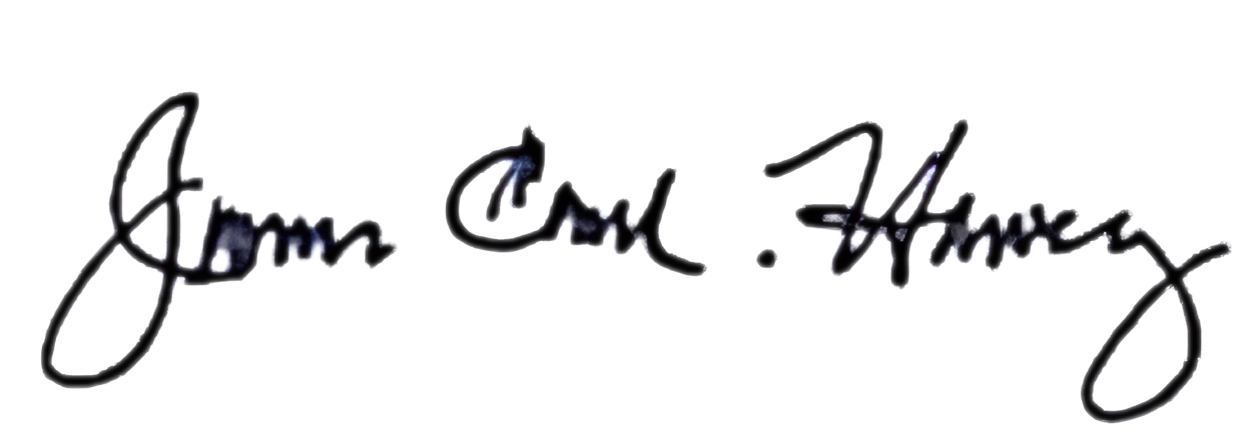
- Signature
- Styles
- Reference style: His Eminence
- Spoken style: Your Eminence
- Religious style: Cardinal
- Informal style: Cardinal

James Michael Harvey (born October 20, 1949) is an American Catholic prelate currently serving as the Archpriest of the Basilica of Saint Paul Outside the Walls. He served from 1982 to 1998 in the central administration of the Secretariat of State at the Vatican. From 1998 to 2012, Harvey managed the pope's household, first for Pope John Paul II and then for Pope Benedict XVI. He was named bishop in 1998, archbishop in 2003, and cardinal in 2012.

== Biography ==
=== Early years and priesthood ===
Harvey was born in Milwaukee, Wisconsin, on October 20, 1949. He was ordained to the priesthood for the Archdiocese of Milwaukee on June 29, 1975, by Pope Paul VI in Rome. Harvey studied at St. Francis Seminary in St. Francis, Wisconsin. He then resided at the Pontifical North American College while studying for a Doctor of Canon Law degree at the Pontifical Gregorian University. He also studied diplomacy at the Pontifical Ecclesiastical Academy in Rome.

Harvey entered the Vatican diplomatic service on March 25, 1980. He served as attaché and then secretary in the apostolic nunciature in the Dominican Republic for two years. On July 10, 1982, Harvey took a position in the Section for Relations with States of the Secretariat of State of the Holy See. He was named assessor for general affairs of that secretariat on July 22, 1997.

=== Prefect of the papal households and archbishop ===
On February 7, 1998, Harvey was named prefect of the papal household by Pope John Paul II, who consecrated him a bishop of the titular see of Memphis on March 19, 1998. As prefect, he oversaw the restoration of the papal audience hall and the papal apartments at Castel Gandolfo in Lazio, Italy. The pope elevated him to archbishop on September 29, 2003. Later, in 2012, a member of Harvey's staff was convicted of stealing documents and leaking them to the media.

=== Archpriest and cardinal ===
Pope Benedict XVI appointed Harvey as archpriest of St Paul Outside the Walls, one of the four major basilicas in Rome, on November 23, 2012. The next day, the pope appointed him cardinal-deacon of San Pio V a Villa Carpegna in Rome. On December 22, 2012, Harvey was appointed a member of the Congregation for the Causes of Saints for a five-year renewable term. On January 31, 2013, Harvey was appointed a member of the Administration of the Patrimony of the Apostolic See and the Congregation for the Evangelization of Peoples. Harvey was one of the cardinal electors who participated in the 2013 papal conclave that elected Pope Francis.

Harvey was awarded the title Knight Grand Cross of the Order of Merit of the Italian Republic by the President of the Italy in 1999. He has also been titled Knight Grand Cross of the Order of Isabella the Catholic.

Pope Francis named Harvey a member of the Supreme Tribunal of the Apostolic Signatura on June 21, 2021.

From 4 March 2022 to 1 July 2024, Harvey was—among the cardinal electors—the highest ranking cardinal deacon. He was thus, as protodeacon, responsible for announcing the election of a new pope. He was elevated to the order of cardinal priests, and thus ceased to be protodeacon, on 1 July 2024. He again participated as a cardinal elector in the 2025 papal conclave that elected Pope Leo XIV.

Besides his native English, he speaks Italian, German, French, and Spanish.

=== McCarrick scandal ===
According to a 2018 Washington Post report, Harvey was one of many Catholic prelates who received large cash gifts from former cardinal Theodore McCarrick. In a 2019 interview, Harvey said that receiving money from other prelates was in no way out of the ordinary, adding that "it never occurred to me that this would be in some way improper" and that "it wasn't about currying favor".

Catholic Church titles
Preceded by Leonardo Sandri	Assessor for General Affairs; July 22, 1997 – February 7, 1998	Succeeded by Pedro Lopez Quintana
Preceded by Dino Monduzzi	Prefect of the Prefecture of the Papal Household; February 7, 1998 – November 23, 2012	Succeeded by Georg Gänswein
Preceded by Francesco Monterisi	Archpriest of the Basilica of Saint Paul Outside the Walls; November 23, 2012 – present	Incumbent
