= Ukrainian Catholic Apostolic Exarchate of Volhynia, Polesia and Pidliashia =

Former Eastern Catholic missionary jurisdiction in Ukraine

The Ukrainian Catholic Apostolic Exarchate of Volhynia, Polesia and Pidliashia was a short-lived (1931–44) pre-diocesan Eastern Catholic (notably Byzantine Rite, Ukrainian language) jurisdiction in three parts of present Ukraine.

== History ==
- Established in 1931 as Apostolic Exarchate of Volhynia, Polesia and Pidliashia / Wolhynien, Polissia und Pidliashia (in German)
- Suppressed in 1944 after Stalin's Red Army reconquered the area.

Its only incumbent was:

- Blessed Bishop Mykola Czarneckyj, Redemptorists (C.SS.R.) (born Ukraine), Apostolic Exarch of Volhynia, Polesia and Pidliashia of the Ukrainians (Ukraine) (1939–1944), Titular Bishop of Lebedus (1931.01.16 – death 1959.04.02).

== See also ==
- List of Catholic dioceses in Ukraine

== Sources and external links ==
- GCatholic - data for all sections
