= Apostolic Administration of Kazakhstan and Central Asia =

Eastern Catholic missionary jurisdiction in Central Asia

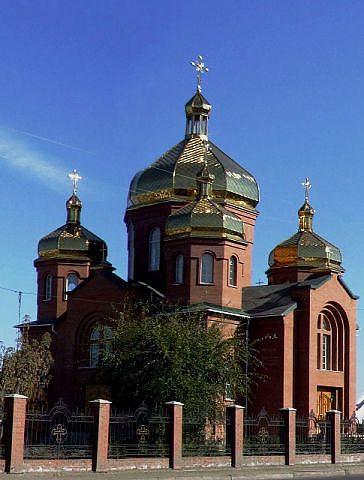
- Holy Protection of the Mother of God Cathedral

Location
- Territory: Kazakhstan; Kyrgyzstan; Tajikistan; Turkmenistan; Uzbekistan
- Ecclesiastical province: Immediately subject to the Holy See
- Headquarters: Karaganda, Kazakhstan

Statistics
- Area: 4,003,451 km^{2} (1,545,741 sq mi)
- Population: 10,000

Information
- Sui iuris church: Eastern Catholic Churches
- Rite: Byzantine
- Established: 1 June 2019
- Cathedral: Holy Protection of the Mother of God Cathedral in Karaganda
- Secular priests: 8
- Language: Church Slavonic (de facto Ukrainian)

Current leadership
- Pope: Leo XIV
- Apostolic Administrator: Rev. Vasyl Hovera

Map
- Territory of the Apostolic Administration

Website
- https://www.ugcc-kazakhstan.com/

The Apostolic Administration of Kazakhstan and Central Asia is an Apostolic Administration (pre-diocesan jurisdiction) and is exempt, i.e. directly subject to the Holy See, that extends its jurisdiction over all the Eastern Catholic faithful of the Byzantine Rite who live in Kazakhstan, Kyrgyzstan, Tajikistan, Turkmenistan and Uzbekistan.

== Pre-History ==
The presence of Catholic faithful of the Byzantine rite in Central Asia dates back to the 17th century, but was sporadic until the 20th century, when their number increased considerably due to the forced mass deportations carried out in the Stalinist era. From 1939 to 1953, some 150,000 faithful of the Ukrainian Greek-Catholic Church were transferred to Central Asia: most of them were to Kazakhstan. About 150 priests were deported with the faithful, including the blessed martyrs Oleksiy Zarytskyi and Nykyta Budka, and the Servant of God Alexander Chira.

After 1991, with the dissolution of the Soviet Union the activities of the Catholic Church, even of the Byzantine rite, became normal. Greek-Catholic parishes were erected in Karaganda, Pavlodar, Astana, Satbayev, Shiderty and Almaty: in addition to these parishes the Byzantine rite Catholics form a dozen communities, scattered in other places. In 1996 here was appointed by the Holy See an Apostolic Visitor, who was replaced in 2002 by Apostolic Delegate and depended from the Congregation for the Oriental Churches.

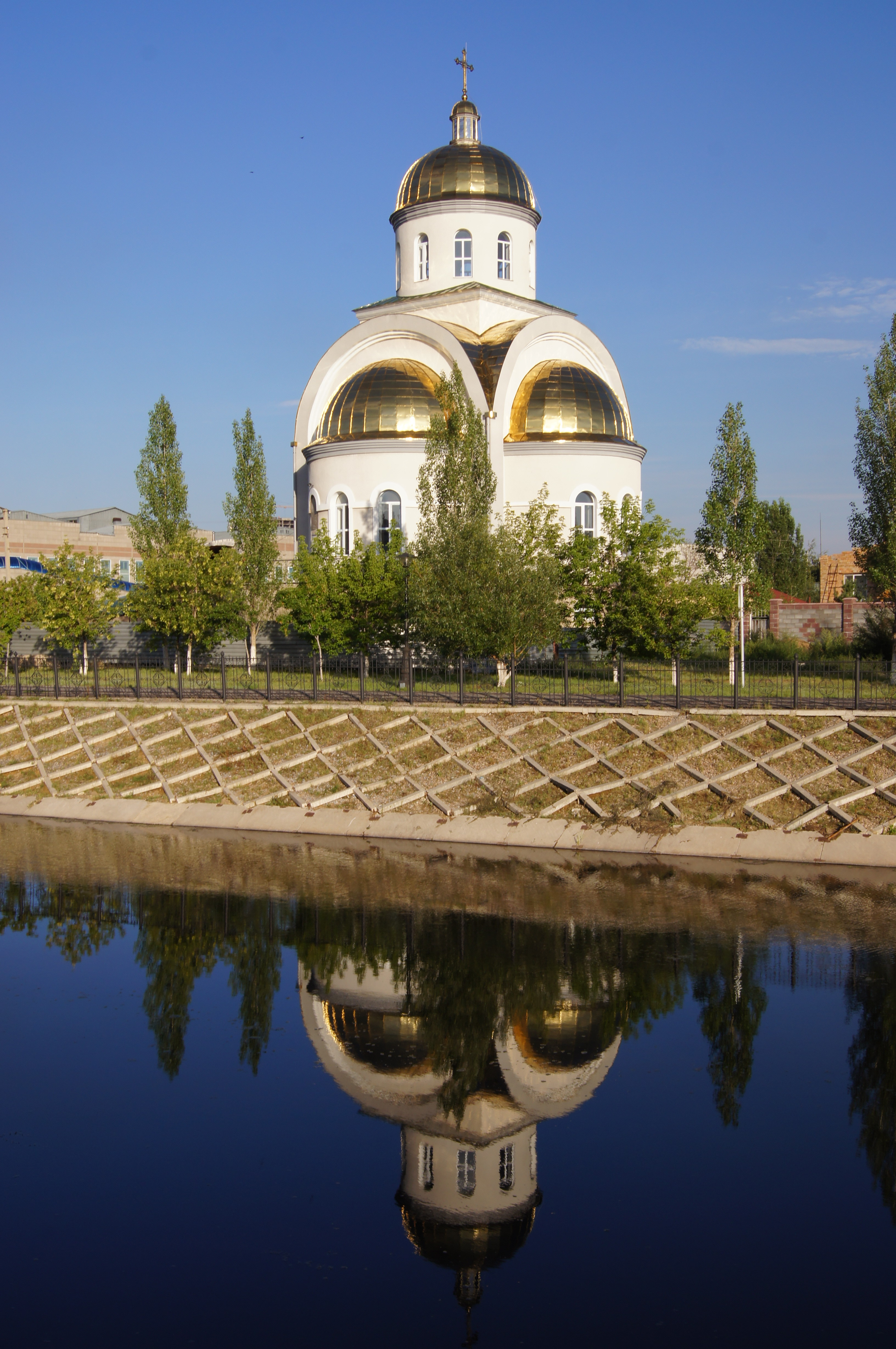
St. Joseph Greek Catholic church in Astana, capital of Kazakhstan

== History ==
It was established on 1 June 2019 by Pope Francis for all the Byzantine Rite (mainly Ukrainian Greek Catholic) parishes. The circumscription encompasses Kazakhstan and others four Central Asia states. The Holy Protection of the Mother of God church, that is located in Karaganda, in Kazakhstan, become as the Cathedral.

On 7 February 2023, by decree of Vasyl Hovera, it was established that the Apostolic Administration for Catholics of the Byzantine rite in Kazakhstan and Central Asia from 1 September 2023 switches to the Revised Julian calendar following the UGCC in Ukraine and Poland.

== Hierarches ==
=== Apostolic Visitor ===
- Wasyl Medwit, O.S.B.M. (December 1996 – 11 November 2002), Titular Bishop of Hadriane

=== Apostolic Delegate ===
- Rev. Vasyl Hovera (11 November 2002 – 1 June 2019)

=== Apostolic Administrator ===
- Rev. Vasyl Hovera (since 1 June 2019)
