= Rémy-Louis Leprêtre =

Rémy-Louis Leprêtre OFM (28 August 1878 – 10 January 1961) was a French prelate of the Catholic Church who served as an archbishop and Apostolic Delegate to Syria from 1936 to 1947.

== Biography ==
Rémy-Louis Leprêtre was born on 28 August 1878 in Le Portel, France. He was ordained a priest of the Order of Friars Minor on 25 June 1903.

On 18 March 1936, Pope Pius XI appointed him titular archbishop of Rhusium and Apostolic Delegate to Syria.

He received his episcopal consecration on 12 May 1936 from Cardinal Luigi Maglione, Apostolic Nuncio to France.

He resigned on 7 May 1947 at the age of 68.

He died on 10 January 1961 at the age of 82.
