= Interdicasterial Commission for the Church in Eastern Europe =

Part of the Roman Curia

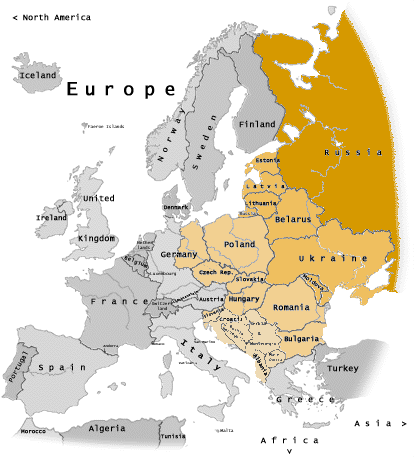
Pre-1989 division between the "West" (grey) and "Eastern Bloc" (orange) superimposed on current borders: Russia (the former RSFSR) (dark orange) Other countries formerly part of the USSR (medium orange) Members of the Warsaw Pact (light orange) Other former Communist regimes not aligned with Moscow (lightest orange)

The Permanent Interdicasterial Commission for the Church in Eastern Europe is part of the Roman Curia. It was established in 1991 to better deal with the rapidly changing situation in the early 1990s. The commission has as its president the Cardinal Secretary of State. Other members include the Secretary and Under-Secretary for Relations with States. As well as the secretaries of the Congregation for the Oriental Churches, Congregation for the Clergy, Congregation for Institutes of Consecrated Life and Societies of Apostolic Life and the Pontifical Council for Promoting Christian Unity.

== Presidents of the Permanent Interdicasterial Commission for the Church in Eastern Europe ==
- Cardinal Angelo Sodano (1 December 1990 – 15 September 2006)
- Cardinal Tarcisio Bertone, S.D.B. (15 September 2006 – 15 October 2013)
- Cardinal Pietro Parolin (15 October 2013 – present)

== Actual members ==
- Archbishop Paul Richard Gallagher - Secretary
- Archbishop Cyril Vasiľ, S.J.
- Archbishop Joël Mercier
- Archbishop José Rodríguez Carballo, O.F.M.
- Bishop Brian Farrell, L.C.
- Msgr. Antoine Camilleri

== See also ==
- Roman Curia
- Interdicasterial Commission for Consecrated Religious
