= Ukrainian Catholic Archiepiscopal Exarchate of Lutsk =

Ukrainian Catholic missionary jurisdiction in north western Ukraine

Coordinates: 50.7500°N 25.3167°E

Archiepiscopal Exarchate of Lutsk Luceoriensis Ucrainorum

Location
- Country: Ukraine
- Territory: Volyn Oblast and Rivne Oblast
- Headquarters: Lutsk, Ukraine

Information
- Sui iuris church: Ukrainian Greek Catholic
- Rite: Byzantine
- Established: 1594 (as Eparchy of Lutsk–Ostroh); 2008 (new)
- Dissolved: 1839
- Cathedral: Cathedral of the Nativity of the Theotokos in Lutsk
- Co-cathedral: Co-Cathedral of St. Nicholas in Rivne

Leadership
- Pope: Leo XIV
- Major Archbishop: Sviatoslav Shevchuk
- Archiepiscopal Exarch: Yosafat Hovera

Map

Website
- Official Website

The Archiepiscopal Exarchate of Lutsk (Lutsk of the Ukrainians) is an Archiepiscopal Exarchate (rare Eastern Catholic pre-diocesan jurisdiction, comparable to a Patriarchal exarchate, Apostolic exarchate or Latin Apostolic vicariate; both other cases are also Ukrainian Catholic) in Ukraine of the Ukrainian Greek Catholic Church (Byzantine Rite in Ukrainian language).

Its cathedral episcopal see is the Cathedral of the Nativity of the Theotokos, in Lutsk (Луцьк), Volyn Oblast.

== Statistics ==
As per 2014, it pastorally served 3,173 Catholics in 26 parishes with 25 priests (15 diocesan, 10 religious), 12 lay religious brothers and 6 seminarians.

== History ==
It was established on 15 January 2008 as Archiepiscopal Exarchate of Lutsk (Luc’k in Curiate Italian), on Ukrainian territory split off from the Ukrainian Catholic Major Archeparchy of Kyiv-Halych, which is the Chief (almost a Patriarch) of the particular church sui iuris, to which it is immediately subject, but not formally a Suffragan, and further depends on the Congregation for the Oriental Churches.

It can be considered the de facto successor of the Ukrainian Catholic Eparchy of Lutsk–Ostroh, which was founded in 1589, twice suppressed and restored, was finally suppressed in 1839, nominally restored as a titular bishopric in 1921 and suppressed even as such in 1973.

== Episcopal ordinaries ==
(all Ukrainian Rite)

Archiepiscopal Exarchs

- Yosafat Hovera (2008.01.15 – ...), Titular Bishop of Cæsariana (2008.01.15 – ...).

== See also ==
- Diocese of Lutsk (Latin Catholic)
- Eparchy of Lutsk–Ostroh (Ruthenian Uniate Church)
- Eparchy of Volodymyr–Brest (Ukrainian Catholic)
- Exarch
