= Szeptycki =

Szeptycki (feminine: Szeptycka) is a Polish-language surname. It belongs to the Polish noble Szeptycki family. The Ukrainian-language spelling of the surname is Sheptytskyi (Ukrainian: Шептицький; feminine: Sheptytska). The name is also sometimes rendered as Sheptytsky or Sheptycki. Notable people with the surname include:

== Szeptycki, Szeptycka ==
- Athanasius Szeptycki (1686–1746), bishop
- Jadwiga Szeptycka (1883–1939), Polish archeologist, ethnographer, writer and social activist
- James Sheptycki, Canadian criminologist
- Kamil Szeptycki (born 1991), Polish actor
- Leo Szeptycki (1717–1779), bishop
- Stanisław Szeptycki (1867–1950), Polish general and minister
- Zofia Szeptycka (1837–1904), Polish countess, poet and painter

== Sheptytsky, Sheptytskyi ==
- Andrey Sheptytsky (1865–1944), Metropolitan Archbishop of the Ukrainian Greek Catholic Church
- Klymentiy Sheptytsky (1869–1951), archimandrite of the Ukrainian Greek Catholic Church
- Oleh Sheptytskyi (born 1986), Ukrainian footballer

== See also ==
- Sheptytskyi, a city in Ukraine
