= Ivan Starchuk =

Ukrainian archaeologist, art historian (1894–1950)

- Іван Данилович Старчук
- Born: 11 May 1894; Pylypy (now Ukraine)
- Died: 12 November 1950 (aged 56); Lviv
- Education: Lviv University
- Occupations: Archaeologist, art historian

Ivan Starchuk (Ukrainian: Іван Данилович Старчук; 11 May 1894 – 12 November 1950) was Ukrainian archaeologist, art historian of the classical antiquity and ancient Kyivan Rus' period.

== Biography ==
Ivan Starchuk was born on 11 May 1894, in the Pylypy, which now belongs to the Mateivka rural hromada of Kolomyia Raion of Ivano-Frankivsk Oblast in Ukraine.

He studied at the Kolomyia gymnasium. In 1913, he entered the Free Academy of Arts in Lviv (thanks to the scholarship of Metropolitan Andrey Sheptytsky), but in August 1914, he was mobilized into the Austrian army. Later he fought as a rifleman in the Ukrainian Galician Army. In 1921, he became a teacher at the Borys Hrinchenko Lviv Folk School. In 1923, he graduated from the Oleksa Novakivskyi Art School.

From 1925, he studied at the Faculty of Humanities of Lviv University, where he remained to teach at the Department of Classical Archaeology.

In 1931, he defended his doctoral dissertation.

From 1935, he was an adjunct to E. Bulanda, author of many publications, including valuable art historical research. He participated in archaeological expeditions. In 1931–1935, he traveled to Greece, Crete, Turkey, Bulgaria, Romania, Hungary, Great Britain, Germany, Greece, Yugoslavia, Bulgaria, Romania, and Hungary.

In 1940–1941 and 1944–1950, he worked at the Department of Archeology at Lviv University, as well as at the Lviv Department of Archeology of the Institute of Archeology of the Academy of Sciences of the USSR. In 1936–1937, he participated in the excavations of Ancient Halych, and in 1946–1949, under his leadership, an expedition conducted research on the settlement in Plisnesk.

He died on 12 November 1950, in Lviv. He was buried at the Yanivskyi cemetery.

== Bibliography ==
- L. Voloshyn (2024). "Старчук Іван". Мистецька школа Олекси Новаківського 1923-1935. Життя у перспективі часу (in Ukrainian). Lviv–Drohobych: Kolo. p. 223, 430—431. ISBN 978-617-642-676-9.
- Старчук О. Спогади про батька / О. Старчук // МДАПВ. — Львів, 2006. — Вип. 10. — С. 329–334.
- Яців Р. «Працюй і молись…» До 100-річчя від дня народження ученого і митця Івана Старчука (1894–1950) / Р. Яців // Молода Галичина. — Львів, 1994. — 14 червня. — No. 68 (6943). — С. 3.
- Домбровський О. Іван Старчук — видатний клясичний археолог / О. Домбровський // Український історик. — 2005. — Том 42. — No. 2/4. — С. 229–233.
