= Pylypy, Ivano-Frankivsk Oblast =

Rural locality in Ivano-Frankivsk Oblast, Ukraine

Pylypy Пилипи
- Location in Ivano-Frankivsk Oblast Pylypy (Ukraine)
- Coordinates: 48°27′59″N 25°7′7″E
- Country: Ukraine
- Oblast: Ivano-Frankivsk Oblast
- Raion: Kolomyia Raion
- Hromada: Mateivtsi rural hromada
- Time zone: UTC+2 (EET)
  - Summer (DST): UTC+3 (EEST)
- Postal code: 78281

Pylypy (Ukrainian: Пилипи) is a village in the Mateivtsi rural hromada of the Kolomyia Raion of Ivano-Frankivsk Oblast in Ukraine.

== History ==
The first written mention of the village was in 1887.

On 19 July 2020, as a result of the administrative-territorial reform and liquidation of the Kolomyia Raion, the village became part of the Kolomyia Raion.

== Religion ==
- Holy Trinity church (1925, wooden)
- Roman Catholic Chapel of St. Michael (1913)

== Notable residents ==
- Ivan Zakharchuk (1922–1948), Knight of the Bronze Cross of Merit of the UPA
- Mykhailo Ivanchuk (1894–1937), Ukrainian geomorphologist, soldier of the Legion of Ukrainian Sich Riflemen and the Ukrainian Galician Army
- Ivan Starchuk (1894–1950), Ukrainian archaeologist, art historian of the ancient and ancient Kyivan Rus' period

== Bibliography ==
- "Pilipy, prysiołek do Pererowa, pow. kołomyjski". Geographical Dictionary of the Kingdom of Poland (in Polish). 8. Warszawa: Kasa im. Józefa Mianowskiego. 1887. p. 142.
