= Zofia Szeptycka =

Polish painter

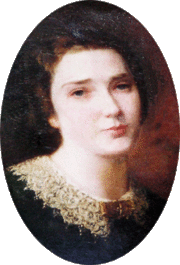
- Born: 20 May 1837; Lviv, Austrian Empire, German Confederation
- Died: 14 April 1904 (aged 66); Prylbychi (now Yavoriv Raion Lviv Oblast Ukraine
- Resting place: Prylbychi
- Occupation: Painter
- Spouse: Jan Kanty Szeptycki (m. 1861)
- Children: Stefan, Jerzy Piotr, Roman Aleksander Maria (Andrey), Aleksander Maria, Stanisław, Kazimierz Maria (Klymentiy), Leon Józef

Zofia Ludwika Cecylia Konstancja Szeptycka de domo Fredro (27 May 1837, Lviv — 17 April 1904, Prylbychi), was a Polish poet and painter. She was also the mother of Andrey Sheptytsky, O.S.B.M., the Metropolitan Archbishop of the Ukrainian Greek Catholic Church (1900–1944), and of the Blessed Hieromartyr Klymentiy Sheptytsky, MSU, an archimandrite of the Order of Studite monks of the Ukrainian Greek Catholic Church.

== Biography ==
Born in the family of Polish playwright Aleksander Fredro, she was educated in Paris and Vienna. In 1855, she was close to the workers of the Hôtel Lambert. In 1856–1861 lived in Lviv, in October 1861 engaged with Jan Kanty Szeptycki. She married Jan and therefore joined the prominent Sheptytsky family.

She had seven sons, two of whom died at an early age: Stefan (1862-1864) and Jerzy Piotr (1863-1880). She was a very religious, which deeply influenced her sons to make a decision to serve God. Roman Aleksander Maria later became a monk and took a name Andrey; and Kazimierz Maria became a Studite monk, under a name Klymentiy.

Another son, Stanisław Maria Jan, graduated from the Vienna Military Academy, and then became a general of the Polish Army. Aleksander Maria was a landowner, Leon Józef Maria was also a landowner, living in the family residence of Prylbychi. Leon and his wife were fusilladed by the NKVD in September 1939, in Prylbychi. Aleksander was killed by the Gestapo in 1940, in Zamość.

== Works ==
Zofia Szeptycka was a painter, who produced portraits of her father, mother, brother and a self-portrait created by her, which are placed in her books, as exhibits. The paintings created by her decorated Catholic churches in Lviv, Kraków, Zhovkva and other places. For the Bernardine Church, Lviv, she painted the portrait of John of Dukla, where the Saint is buried.

Zofia Szeptycka is the author of a number of stories and essays, written as for her family diary. In 1900–1903 she published the book "Memories of the Past Years". In 1904, after her death, newspapers "Gazeta Narodowa" and the Krakówian "Przegląd Polski" for the first time published her stories. She wrote memories of her son Andrey's younger years. The two-volume collection of the "Letters" by Zofia Szeptycka was published in Kraków in 1906–1907.

She died on 17 April 1904. She was buried on Prylbychi's family land.

== Literature ==
- Barbara Lasocka: Aleksander Fredro. Drogi życia, Oficyna Wydawnicza Errata, Warszawa 2001, ISBN 83-913140-4-9.
- Zbigniew Kuchowicz: Al. Fredro we fraku i w szlafroku. Osobowość i życie prywatne – Łódź: KAW, 1989.
- Zofia Szeptycka: Młodość i powołanie ojca Romana Andrzeja Szeptyckiego zakonu św. Bazylego Wielkiego, oprac. Bogdan Zakrzewski, Wrocław: Towarzystwo Przyjaciół Polonistyki Wrocł., 1993.
- Zofia Szeptycka: Wspomnienia z lat ubiegłych, przyg. do druku, wstępem i przypisami opatrzył B. Zakrzewski, Wrocław: Zakł. Nar. im. Ossolińskich, 1967.
