= Battle of Minsk =

Battle of Minsk may refer to one of the following battles:

- Operation Minsk, a military offensive of the Polish Army resulting in the recapture of Minsk from the Bolsheviks in 1919
- Battle of Białystok–Minsk in 1941 in the opening stage of Operation Barbarossa
- Minsk Offensive of 1944, an offensive of the Red Army, part of Operation Bagration
