= Mateyivtsi =

Village in Ivano-Frankivsk Oblast, Ukraine

Mateyivtsi Матеївці
- Village
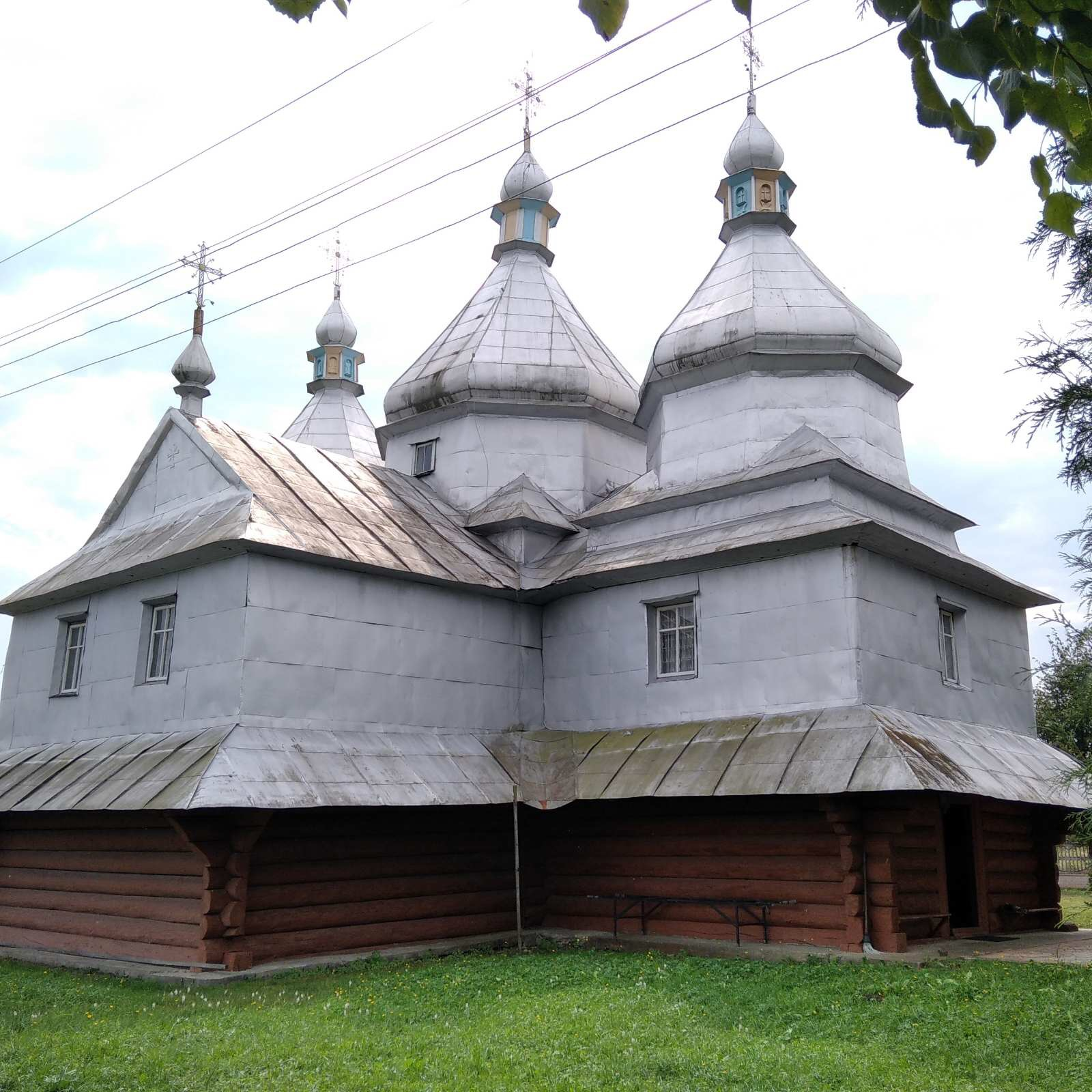
- The Church of the Intercession in Mateyivtsi

- Location of Novytsia in Ivano-Frankivsk Oblast Location of Novytsia in Ukraine
- Coordinates: 48°29′52″N 25°09′45″E
- Country: Ukraine
- Oblast: Ivano-Frankivsk Oblast
- Raion: Kolomyia Raion
- First mentioned: 1764

Population
  - Total: 1,753

Mateyivtsi (Ukrainian: Матеївці; Polish: Matyjowce), also known as Matiyivtsi (Ukrainian: Матіївці) is a village in Kolomyia Raion, Ivano-Frankivsk Oblast, in western Ukraine. It is the administrative centre of Mateyivtsi rural hromada. Its population is 1,753 (as of 2023).

== History ==
Mateyivtsi was first mentioned in 1764. As of 1939, the village had a population of 1,050, according to Volodymyr Kubijovyč. Of these, 950 were Ukrainians, 60 were Polish people, 30 were Jews, and 10 were Latynnyky.

There is a wooden church in the village, known as the Church of the Intercession. It was constructed in 1834 as a replacement for the original (possibly built in 1695).
