= Klymentiy Sheptytsky =

Ukrainian Greek Catholic archimandrite and martyr

Blessed Klymentiy Sheptytsky M.S.U.
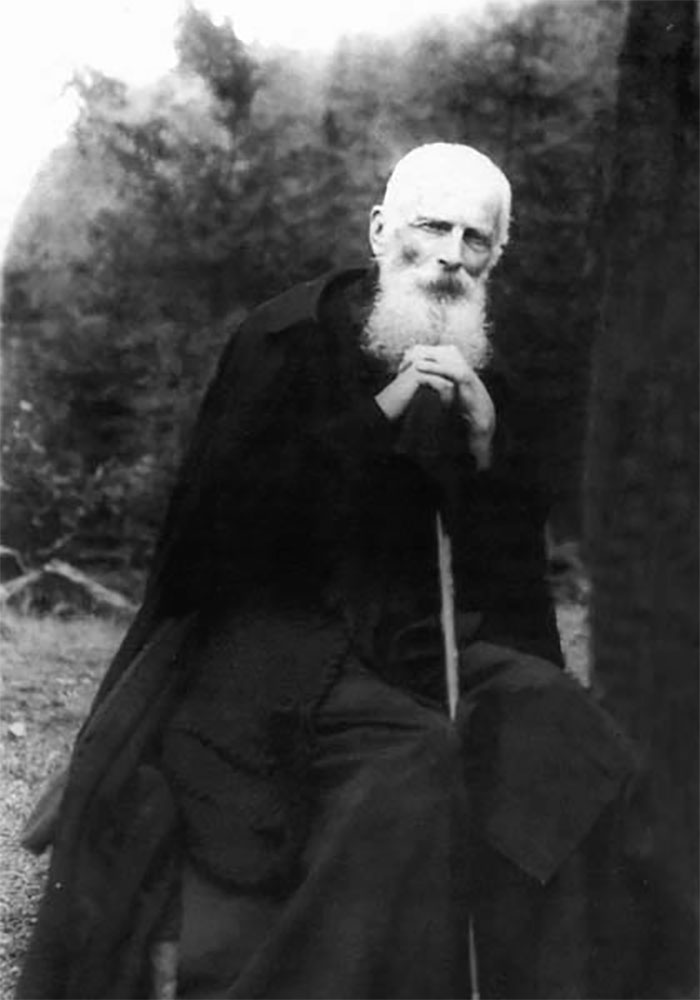
- Szeptycki in the 1930s

Hieromartyr
- Born: 17 November 1869; Prylbychi, Lviv Oblast, Kingdom of Galicia and Lodomeria; Austro-Hungary
- Died: 1 May 1951 (aged 81); Vladimir Central Prison, Russian SFSR, Soviet Union
- Venerated in: Catholic Church
- Beatified: 27 June 2001, Lviv, Ukraine, by Pope John Paul II
- Feast: 1 May

Klymentiy Sheptytsky, MSU (Polish: Klemens Szeptycki, Ukrainian: Климентій Шептицький; 17 November 1869 – 1 May 1951), also known as Klymentiy of Univ (Ukrainian: Климентій Унівський), was a Ukrainian Catholic prelate who served as archimandrite of the Studite Monks in the Ukrainian Greek Catholic Church and as Russian Catholic Apostolic Exarch of Great Russia and Siberia. Sheptytsky was arrested and died a political prisoner of the Soviet Union in the Vladimir Central Prison in Russia. He was beatified in 2001 and named Righteous Among the Nations by the State of Israel for saving Jewish lives during the Holocaust in Ukraine.

== Early life ==
Sheptytsky was born as Kazimierz Maria Szeptycki on 17 November 1869 in the village of Prylbychi, Yavorich Region, near Lviv in Galicia to an old Polish-Ruthenian noble family. The Szeptycki family lived in the eastern part of Poland, near Zamość, in Labunie's Palace. At that time, the area was of the Austro-Hungarian Empire. He was a younger brother of the future Venerable, Metropolitan Bishop Andrey Sheptytsky, and received his education first at home and starting in 1882 at Kraków. Sheptytsky later also studied at the Ludwig-Maximilians-Universität München and the University of Paris. In 1892, he became a doctor of law at the Jagiellonian University. After finishing his studies, he returned home to manage the family estates and look after his aging parents. In 1900, Casimir Sheptytsky was elected to the Austrian parliament, and a member of the National Council, however after its dissolution in 1907, he decided to withdraw from politics.

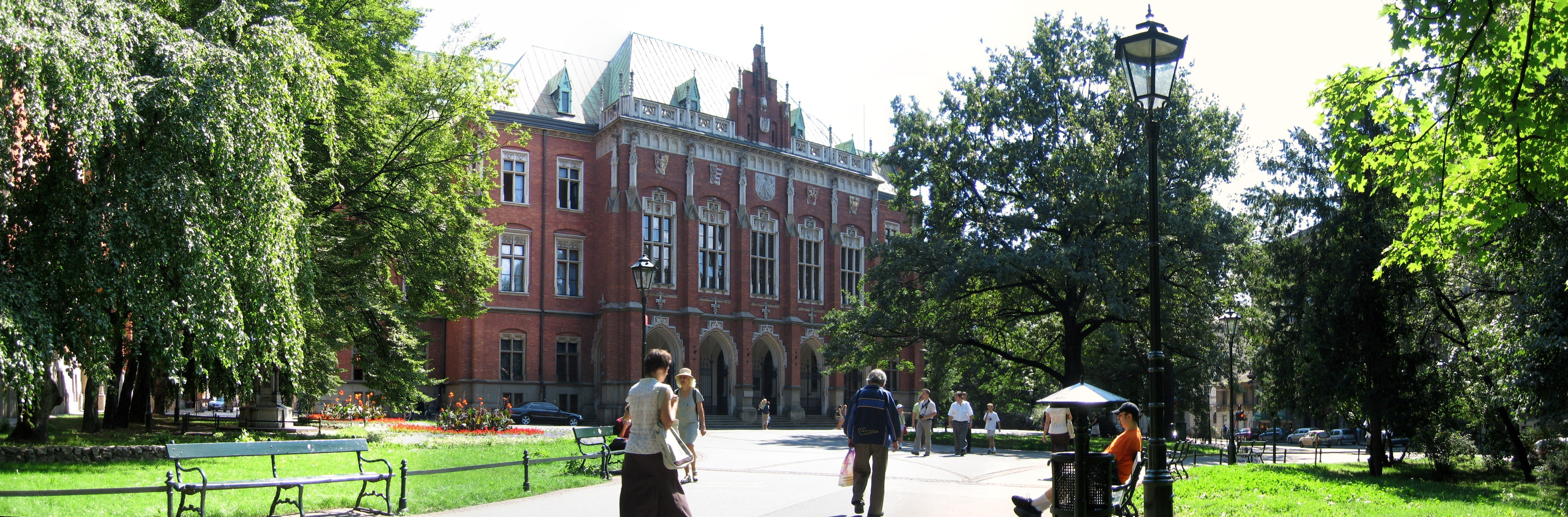
Jagiellonian University

In 1911, Sheptytsky decided to become a monk and entered the Benedictine (Latin Rite) Beuron Archabbey (Baden-Württemberg), Germany. After a year he decided to follow the example of his older brother, returning to the Ukrainian Greek Catholic Church of their ancestors and entered the Studite Monastery at Kamenica, near Čelinac, Bosnia-Herzegovina. He took the religious name of Clement, after Pope Clement I, martyred in Chersonesos, who together with Andrew the Apostle is considered to be the founder of Christianity in the Balkans. In 1913, he undertook theological studies at the University of Innsbruck and on 28 August 1915 he was ordained a priest by the Greek Catholic Bishop of Križevci, Croatia, Eparch Dionisije Njaradi, while he studied. He took solemn vows on 22 December 1917 as a member of the Ukrainian Studite Monks. After finishing them in 1919 returned to Ukraine to settle in the Holy Dormition Lavra, currently in Lviv Raion of Lviv Oblast.

Family coat of arms Sheptytsky of Blessed Clement Sheptytsky

In 1926, Sheptytsky was named the hegumen (prior) of the Univ Lavra and in 1944, became the Archmandrite (abbot). In 1937 he came to Lviv to aid his ailing brother Andrew (Andrey). In 1939 the region was occupied by communists and the Soviets immediately implemented a plan to eliminate the Ukrainian intellectual elites and church. At the time they did not arrest the Metropolitan himself, fearing his great authority among the nation, but went after his family attempting to capture Sheptytsky and murdering their brother Leon along with his family.

On 17 September 1939, Metropolitan Andrey appointed Klymentiy Sheptytsky the Russian Catholic Apostolic Exarch of Great Russia and Siberia. Communication with the Vatican was limited because of the Soviet annexation, but the Vatican officially recognized this appointment in November or December 1941. The borders of the apostolic exarchate were defined as "ethnic Great Russia, Finland, and Siberia" by the 1942 synod of exarchs, though he had practically no connection with anyone there because it was all under Soviet control. Sheptytsky still prepared literature for possible future missionary work there and in 1942 established a separate vicariate for Siberia. When the Russian Jesuit Viktor Novikov secretly went into Soviet territory, he was designated vice-exarch of Siberia by Sheptytsky.

== World War II ==
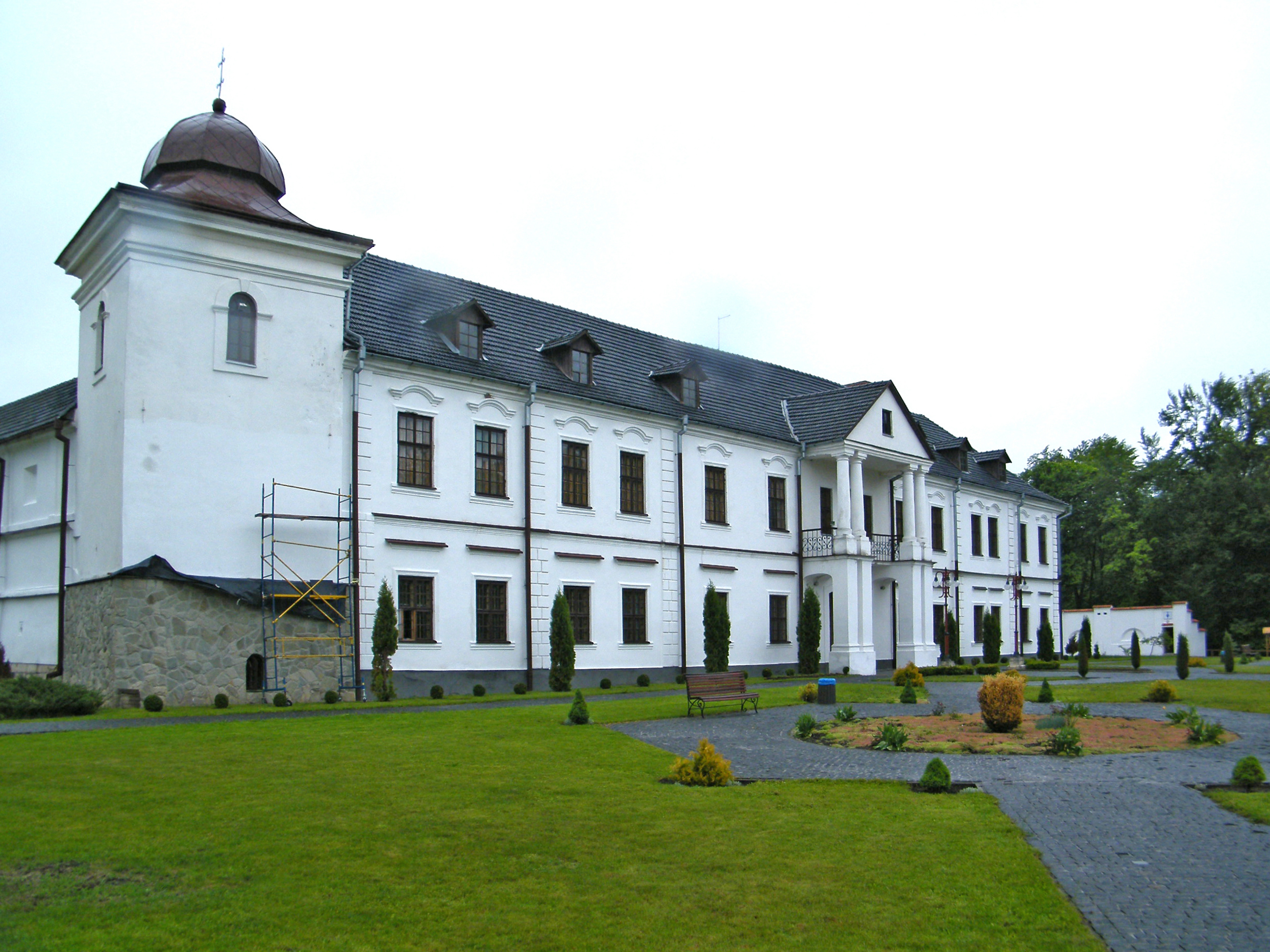
Univ Lavra

In 1941 the persecution of Christians was interrupted with the outbreak of the Nazi-Soviet war and the German occupation of Ukraine, however the situation did not improve much. During that time Sheptytsky helped his brother Andrey Sheptytsky rescue Jews, harboring them in Studite monasteries and organizing groups that would aid them in escaping to Hungarian-controlled Governorate of Subcarpathia.

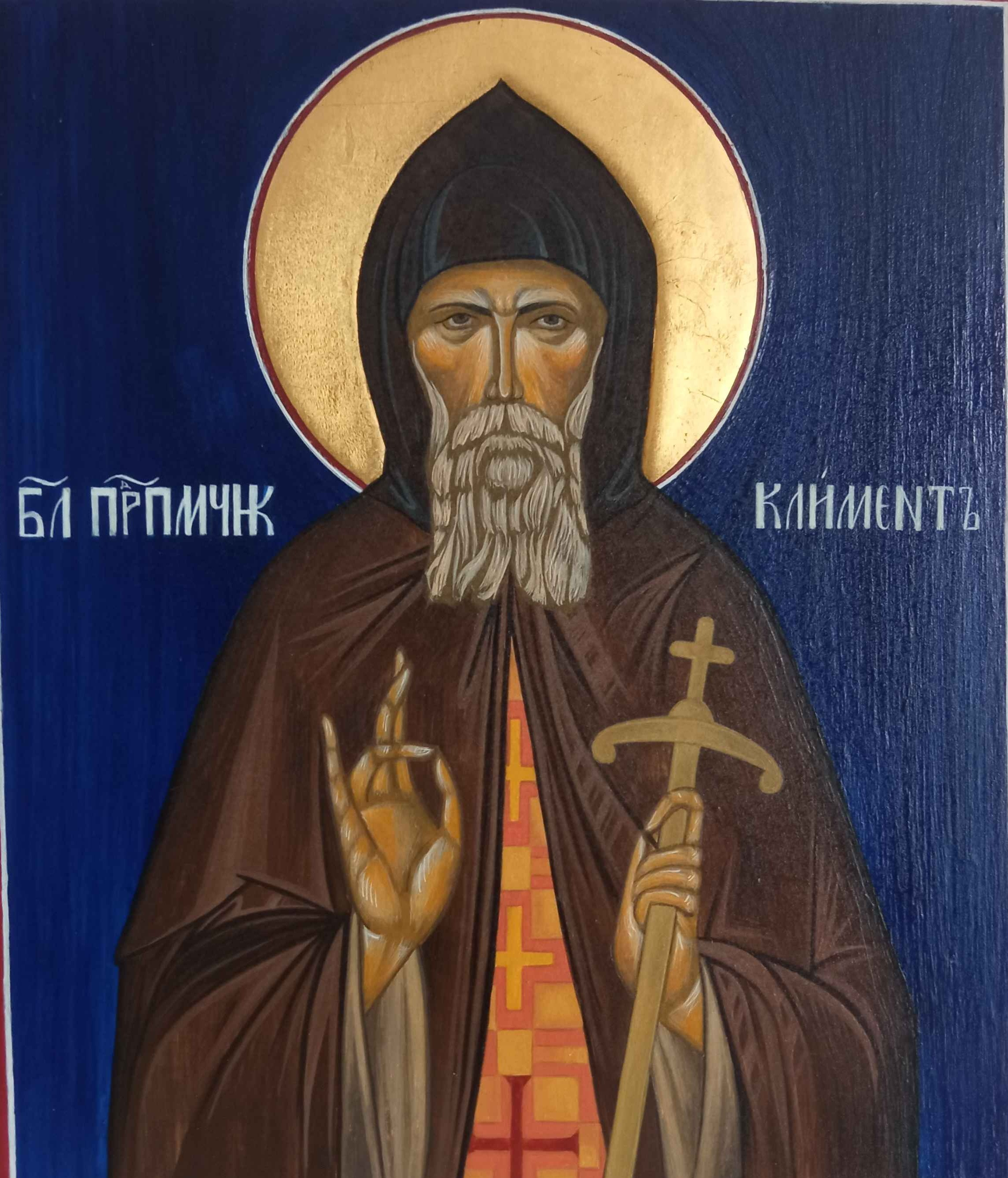
Icon of Venerable martyr Klymentiy of Univ

From 1941 to 1944, when the region was occupied by Nazi Germany, Jewish boys were hidden at the monastery in Univ, home to monks of the Ukrainian Greek Catholic Church. Univ was particularly important because it was the main Studite monastery; with its large community of monks, younger boys would go unnoticed by authorities. Along with the handful of holy men who were the children's daily caretakers, three figures were instrumental in their safekeeping: Metropolitan Andrey Sheptytsky, the head of the Ukrainian Greek Catholic Church, his brother Klymentiy, and Omelyan Kovch, a priest from the nearby town of Peremyshliany. Kurt I. Lewin, whose father was Lviv's last rabbi and who would later become a renowned businessman, and David Kahane, later chief rabbi in the Israeli Air Force, were both harbored by Sheptytsky in Lviv. Later in their lives, both men would write about their experiences, Lewin in A Journey Through Illusions and Kahane in the Lvov Ghetto Diary.

Sheptytsky was recognized as one of the Righteous among the Nations by the State of Israel in 1995.

== Soviet persecution ==
With the return of the Soviets in 1944 a coordinated action to destroy the church and subject it to the Moscow Patriarchate was implemented. After the death of the Metropolitan, his successor, Joseph Slipyj, named Sheptytsky the Archimandrite of the Studite Order. This meant that at the time of the mass arrest of church hierarchs carried out by the NKVD in 1945 he was one of the highest ranking clergymen left. As such he became an informal leader of the church, meeting with monks and priests and strengthening them in their resolve. On 5 June 1947, he himself was arrested by Soviet authorities and held, first in an NKVD prison in Lviv, then in Kyiv, and finally, after his steadfast refusal to renounce his faith and serve the Moscow Patriarchate, sentenced to eight years imprisonment. Ivan Kryvytskyi described him:

He reminded me of Saint Nicholas ... We never expected such a rascal in our room ... Some sisters had passed three apples to him, real rosy red and ripe. And he gave one apple to Roman Novosad, who often had stomach problems. He said: 'You need to take care of your stomach,' and the others he divided among us.

He died on 1 May 1951 in Vladimir Central Prison.

== Veneration ==
Sheptytsky was beatified on 27 June 2001 by Pope John Paul II in Lviv, during his apostolic journey to Ukraine, together with 27 other members of the Ukrainian Catholic Church previously declared Venerable.

On 29 July 2011, a monument to Andrey and Klymentiy Sheptytsky was unveiled in their home village of Prylbychi.

== Family ==
Klymentiy Sheptytsky was born into the prominent Sheptytsky family.

He was one of five sons of Jan Kanty Szeptycki and his wife Zofia Fredro. His brothers were Andrey, Stanislaw, Leon and Aleksander.

== Legacy ==
In November 2011, James Temerty, chairman of the Ukrainian-Jewish Encounter Initiative (UJE) donated $1.2 million to establish three endowed chairs in Jewish Studies at the Ukrainian Catholic University in Lviv, Ukraine.

A human rights activist, who served time in Soviet prisons, Myroslav Marynovych, the vice Rector of the Ukrainian Catholic University, said:

We have always wanted to plunge more deeply into the legacy of previous generations of ethnic Ukrainians and Jews who lived on historically Ukrainian lands. This legacy knows not only pain and injustice, but also the experience of tolerant co-existence and mutual assistance. In order to guarantee a humane outline for the future, we must not forget the former and actively the experience the latter. For example, the spiritual inheritance of the Sheptytsky brothers alone, Andrey and Klymentiy, is sufficient to reveal to the contemporary person all the beauty of the love of humanity.

== See also ==
- Russian Catholic Apostolic Exarchate of Russia
