= Mateivtsi rural hromada =

Hromada in Ivano-Frankivsk Oblast, Ukraine

Mateivtsi rural hromada Матеївецька сільська громада
- Hromada
- Interactive map of Mateivtsi rural hromada
- Country: Ukraine
- Oblast: Ivano-Frankivsk Oblast
- Raion: Kolomyia Raion
- Admin. center: Mateivtsi

Area
  - Total: 78.61 km^{2} (30.35 sq mi)

Population (2018)
  - Total: 6,657
  - Density: 84.68/km^{2} (219.3/sq mi)
- CATOTTG code: UA26080110000076323
- Settlements: 17
- Rural settlements: 1
- Villages: 16
- Website: mateivetska-gromada.gov.ua

Mateivtsi rural hromada (Ukrainian: Матеївецька сільська громада) is a hromada in Ukraine, in Kolomyia Raion of Ivano-Frankivsk Oblast. The administrative center is the village of Mateivtsi.

== Settlements ==
The hromada consists of 17 villages:

- Hanniv
- Hutsulivka
- Debeslavtsi
- Zaluchchia
- Zamulyntsi
- Korosty
- Kryvobrody
- Krynychky
- Kropyvyshche
- Lypnyky
- Mateivtsi
- Pereryv
- Pylypy
- Semakivtsi
- Trach
- Trostianka
- Tsutsulyn
