= Szeptycki family =

Ruthenian noble family

Szeptycki Шептицькі
- Noble family
- Country: Polish–Lithuanian Commonwealth
- Current region: Ukraine, Poland
- Founded: May 12, 1469; 557 years ago
- Founder: Fiodor Szeptycki
- Historic seat: Szeptyce (Lviv Oblast, Ukraine)
- Titles: Count of the Austria-Hungary empire (from 1871)
- Connected families: Starowieyski, Fredo, Wiśniowiecki, Ledóchowski

Szeptycki family (in Polish spelling; or Шептицькі (Sheptytsky) in Ukrainian spelling) is a distinguished part of the Polish szlachta, of Ruthenian origin. The Szeptycki family was ennobled by the King of Poland, Casimir IV Jagiellon, on April 12, 1469, in Gródek. The family was related to a number of other noble families, such as the Wiśniowiecki, the Ledóchowski and the Fredro.

Originally Eastern Orthodox, some time after 1596 the family joined the Greek Catholic Church following the Union of Brest.

From the 16th century, the family's members started to acquire important offices in the Polish–Lithuanian Commonwealth, especially in ecclesiastical orders (Greek Catholic Church and Catholic Church). In 1871, the family received the title of Count of the Holy Roman Empire. Around that time, the family became increasingly polonized and converted preponderantly to the Roman Catholic faith.

Notable 20th-century members included the Austro-Hungarian and then Polish general Stanisław Szeptycki, and Ukrainian monk and blessed Klymentiy Sheptytsky and Metropolitan Archbishop Andrey Sheptytsky.

The family continues to be active and has created a foundation (Fundacja Rodu Szeptyckich), seated in Warszawa, Poland.

== Main historical representatives ==
=== First Generation ===
Szeptycki's rights were created on April 12, 1469, by King Casimir IV Jagiellon in Gródek (present day Horodok, Lviv, Ukraine). Fiodor Szeptycki, together with grandsons Fiodor, Hlib and Sienek were confirmed in the ownership of their estates of Szeptyce, Woszczańce and Kanafosty, then part of Polish–Lithuanian Commonwealth, today located in Ukraine.

=== II^{nd} Generation ===
- Jan Szeptycki, son of Fiodor, from Szeptyce and Uherce Wieniawskie.

=== III^{rd} Generation ===
- Hlib Szeptycki, son of Jan, from Szeptyce, Uherce Wieniawskie i Woszczańce.

=== IV^{th} Generation ===
- Janek Szeptycki, son of Hlib, from Szeptyce, Uherce Wieniawskie i Woszczańce.

=== V^{th} Generation ===
Janek's sons were given the following estates:

- Szeptyce and Kanafosty for Jerzy Szeptycki;
- Woszczańce for Teodor Szeptycki;
- Uherce Wieniawskie for Semion Szeptycki.

=== VI^{th} Generation ===
- Paweł Szeptycki, Jerzy's son, inherited Szeptyce estate. He was a lieutenant in the Polish hussars.
- Aleksander Szeptycki, Teodor's son, owned the Woszczańce estate. He served also in the Polish hussars.
- Mikolaj Szeptycki, Semion's son, was a colonel of the crown and a captain in the Polish hussars.

=== VII^{th} Generation ===
- Jerzy Prokop Szeptycki, son of Paweł, owned Szeptyce village.
- Aleksander Zahariasz Szeptycki, Aleksander's son, had the Kupnowice estate.

=== VIII^{th} Generation ===
- Jerzy Prokop's sons:
  - Stefan Szeptycki, owned the Szeptyce estate. He became in 1683 a cavalry captain in the hussars. He married Zofia, née Korybut-Daszkiewicz.
  - Adam Szeptycki from Szeptyce.
- Aleksander Zahariasz's sons:
  - Baarlam (Bazyl) Szeptycki (1647–1715) was a bishop in Lviv. He was originally a bishop of the Eastern Orthodox rite, before converting to the Greek rite;
  - Eustachy Stanisław was a lieutenant in the hussars. He participated in the Sandomierz Confederation (1704).
  - Teodor Szeptycki, became a companion in the hussars. He was wounded in 1683: his coat of arms was hung in the chapel on the hill of Kahlenberg;
  - Alexander Sheptytsky.

=== IX^{th} Generation ===
- Zofia's and Stefan's sons:
  - Atanazy Andrzej Szeptycki (1723–1779) was the Eparch of Przemyśl (Ukrainian Rite). He started the construction of a new cathedral in Przemyśl, though only the belfry was completed during his tenure;
  - Bazyli Szeptycki, from Przyłbice, who married Rozalia.
- Eustachy Stanisław's sons:
  - Hieronim Antoni Szeptycki (1700–1773) was the Bishop of Płock. An elector from the Płock province, he participated to the election of king Stanisław August Poniatowski in 1764. The same year, he was appointed to a Sejm commission. In 1766, he was appointed resident senator. In 1760, he was awarded the Order of the White Eagle. He died in his palace in Krakowskie Przedmieście in Warsaw and was buried in the collegiate church of the Annunciation of the Blessed Virgin Mary and St. Matthew in Pułtusk;
  - Jerzy Szeptycki, living in Pohorylce, was a cavalry captain in the hussars;
  - Franciszek Szeptycki, a cup-bearer in Lviv (1765–1775) and a hood court judge (Polish: Sąd kapturowy) in the Lviv region in 1764.
- Athanasius Szeptycki (Atanazy Antoni Szeptycki) (1686–1746), son of Aleksander, was the Eparch of Lviv and the Ruthenian Uniate Church archbishop of Kiev. He started the construction of the St. George's Cathedral in Lviv and participated in the Synod of Zamość (1720). In 1732, he led to the opening of a printing house in Uniów. As a metropolitan, he carried out the Latinization of temples and clergy's clothes.
- Filip Szeptycki, son of Adam, from Szeptyce.

=== X^{th} Generation ===
- Bazyli and Rozalia's sons:
  - Jan Baptysta, from Przyłbice, married Aniela Lipska;
  - Andrzej Szymon Szeptycki, from Bruchnal (today's Tarnowica, Ukraine).
- Filip's sons:
  - Leo Szeptycki (1717–1779) was the Metropolitan of Kiev, Galicia and all Ruthenia. In 1764, he was an elector of Stanisław August Poniatowski, representing the Halych Land. After the First Partition of Poland (1772), he championed the creation of a Greek Catholic metropolis in Lviv. He was made knight of the Order of Saint Stanislaus in 1767 and knight of the Order of the White Eagle in 1775.
  - Szymon Szeptycki was a castellan of Malczyce. His wife was Anna Trembińska. He was made knight of the Orders of the White Eagle and St. Stanislaus.
- Rozalia, daughter of Jerzy, married Bazyli Szeptycki.
- Franciszek's sons:
  - Jan Szeptycki, living in Liczkowce;
  - Hieronim Szeptycki was a landowner. He served in the Lithuanian Guard. An Aide-de-camp of king Stanisław August Poniatowski, he eventually reached the rank of commanding general;
  - Kajetan Szeptycki was a castellan of Jakubowice Murowane. He was made knight of the Orders of the White Eagle and St. Stanislaus;
  - Józef Szeptycki purchased in 1775 the Starosta of Stanisławów from Felicjanna née Czosnowska, widow of Jan Antoni Czarnecki, castellan of Bracław. He was made knight of the Orders of the White Eagle and St. Stanislaus.

=== XI^{th} Generation ===
- Jan Baptysta's sons:
  - Józef Gabriel(1806–1855), died in Łaszczów without issue;
  - Piotr Paweł Leopold (1808–1843) married Róża Teresa Ewelina née Kossecki (1808–1888), they lived in Przyłbice. Róża Teresa was a lady of the Order of the Starry Cross.
- Marianna, Szymon's daughter, married Maciej Jabłonowski (1757–1844), a Polish prince and politician, member of the Central Government in Galicia in 1809 and captain of the National Cavalry (1785).
- Jan's children:
  - Wincenty Wiktor Leon (1782–1836) was a Brigadier General of the Polish Army. During the Napoleonic Wars, he served in Spain, Austria and Russia. For his bravery, he was awarded the French Ordre de la Réunion and the Order of the Two Sicilies as well as the Russian Order of Saint Anna, class 3. He later participated in the November Uprising, commanding the forces in the Lublin region. As such, on June 17, 1831, he was promoted to brigadier general and organized the Volhynia-Ruthenian-Lithuanian Legion. He is buried in the Lychakiv Cemetery in Lviv in one of the first cast iron sarcophagi of the graveyard.
  - Julianna, Jan's daughter, got married with Józef Zaborowski. She was the mother of poet Tymon Zaborowski.

=== XII^{th} Generation ===
- Piotr Paweł's children:
  - Michalina Władysławowa Komorowska née Szeptycki (1835–1911);
  - Jan Kanty Remigian (1836–1912) was the landowner of several estates (Przyłbice, Bruchnal, Korczyna, Łaszczów, Grodysławice, Dziewietniki). He became a parliament member at the State Council of the 3rd and 4th terms (1870–1873) and at the National Sejm. On October 1, 1861, he married Zofia Ludwika Cecylia Konstancja née Fredro, daughter of the Polish playwright Aleksander Fredro. Jan Kanty was the first of the Szeptycki family to bear the title of Count of the Holy Roman Empire in 1871.

=== XIII^{th} Generation ===
Zofia's and Jan Kanty's children:

- Stefan Kanty Aleksander who died in infancy (1862–1864);
- Jerzy Piotr, who died as a child (1863–1880);
- Roman Aleksander Maria Szeptycki (1865–1944) bore the title of Count before entering religious life in 1888. He was the Greek Catholic Archbishop of Lviv and Metropolitan of Halych from 1901 until his death in 1944. His tenure in office spanned two world wars and seven political regimes: Austrian, Russian, Ukrainian, Polish, Soviet, Nazi German, and again Soviet;
- Count Aleksander Maria Szeptycki (1866–1940) was the owner of the following estates: Łaszczów, Grodysławice, Pukarzów, Zimno, Cherkasy, Podhajce, Nadolce, Hopkie and Ruda Żelazna. In 1902, he purchased the estate of Łabunie from Polish diplomat Jan Stanisław Amor Tarnowski but the family never lived in the palace, because of its derelict state. Aleksander bequeathed the palace complex with the 25 hectares (62 acres) park and outbuildings to the Franciscan Missionaries of Mary (FMM) who had been running here an orphanage with his approval. The Count's decision was a gift to the congregation, in gratitude for taking care of his sick daughter Maria. The latter suffered from tuberculosis and died in 1917 in Łabunie. The estate is still today (2023) in the hands of the FMM. Aleksander was tortured to death by the Gestapo on June 19, 1940, in the Rotunda Zamość. He is the father-in-law of Blessed Stanisław Kostka Starowieyski;
- Count Stanisław Maria Jan Teofil (1867–1950) became a Lieutenant General of the Polish Army and served during WWI and Polish–Soviet War. He was briefly a Minister of Military Affairs (June to December 1923). After Piłsudski's May 1926 Coup d'État, Stanisław was dismissed from active service. After World War II, from 1945 to 1950, he headed the Polish Red Cross (Polski Czerwony Krzyż). He died in 1950 in his estate in Korczyna without issue;
- Blessed father Klemens Kazimierz (1869–1951) was an archimandrite of the Order of Studite monks (Ukrainian Greek Catholic Church) and a hieromartyr. Klymentiy has been beatified by the Catholic Church and received the title of Righteous Among the Nations by the State of Israel for saving Jews. As a leader of the church, he was arrested by the NKVD in 1947 and died a prisoner of the Soviet Union in a jail in Volodymyr (Polish: Włodzimierz); A commemorative plaque had been unveiled in Volodymyr at a memorial complex erected on the site of the mass grave of Soviet victims; the plaque was dismantled by the Russian authorities in October 2023.
- Leon Józef (1877–1939) owner of Przyłbice and Bruchnal estates. Leon was a Polish aristocrat, landowner and social worker. He was awarded the title of papal chamberlain. Leon married in 1902 Jadwiga, née Szembek (1883–1939); she was the great-granddaughter of poet Aleksander Fredro and an archeologist and ethnographer, writer and social activist. The couple had eight children. During the Soviet invasion of Poland, Jadwiga and Leon were both murdered by the NKVD in the family estate of Przyłbice. Two of their daughters belonged to the Franciscan Missionaries of Mary, Wanda and Zofia Maria Bronisława (1904–1958) who became the superior of the Polish Province of the Order;

=== XIV^{th} Generation ===
- Jan Kazimierz (1907–1994), son of Aleksander, was the owner of Łaszczów, Grodysławice and Łabunie (till 1922).
- Jadwiga's and Leon Józef's sons:
  - Jan Sylwester (1905–1980) owned the estate of Dziewiętniki (in today's Ukraine);
  - Andrzej (1912–1940) was a cleric of the seminary in Lviv and a cadet of the Polish Army reserve. He is one of the numerous victims of the Katyn massacre.

=== XV^{th} Generation ===
- Jan Sylwester's sons:
  - Paweł (1935–2004) was a professor of mathematics;
  - Andrzej Szeptycki (1939–2008) was a professor of zoology.
- Aleksander Szeptycki (1938–2020), Jan Kazimierz's son, was a Polish specialist in agricultural mechanization, an engineer and a Doctor habilitatus. He was the owner of the Nadolec estate.

== See also ==
- Ruthenian nobility
- Stanisław Kostka Starowieyski
- Fredo family
- Wiśniowiecki family
- Ledóchowski family
- Jadwiga Szeptycka
- Stanisław Szeptycki
- Andrey Sheptytsky
- Klymentiy Sheptytsky

== Bibliography ==
- Samuel Orgelbrand (1903). Encyklopedja Powszechna. S. Orgelbranda synów. p. 254.
- Bogdan Zakrzewski (1993). Fredro nie tylko komediopisarz. Wydawn. Uniwersytetu Wrocławskiego. p. 163. ISBN 978-83-229-0957-7.
