= Stanisław Szeptycki =

Polish general and count (1867–1950)

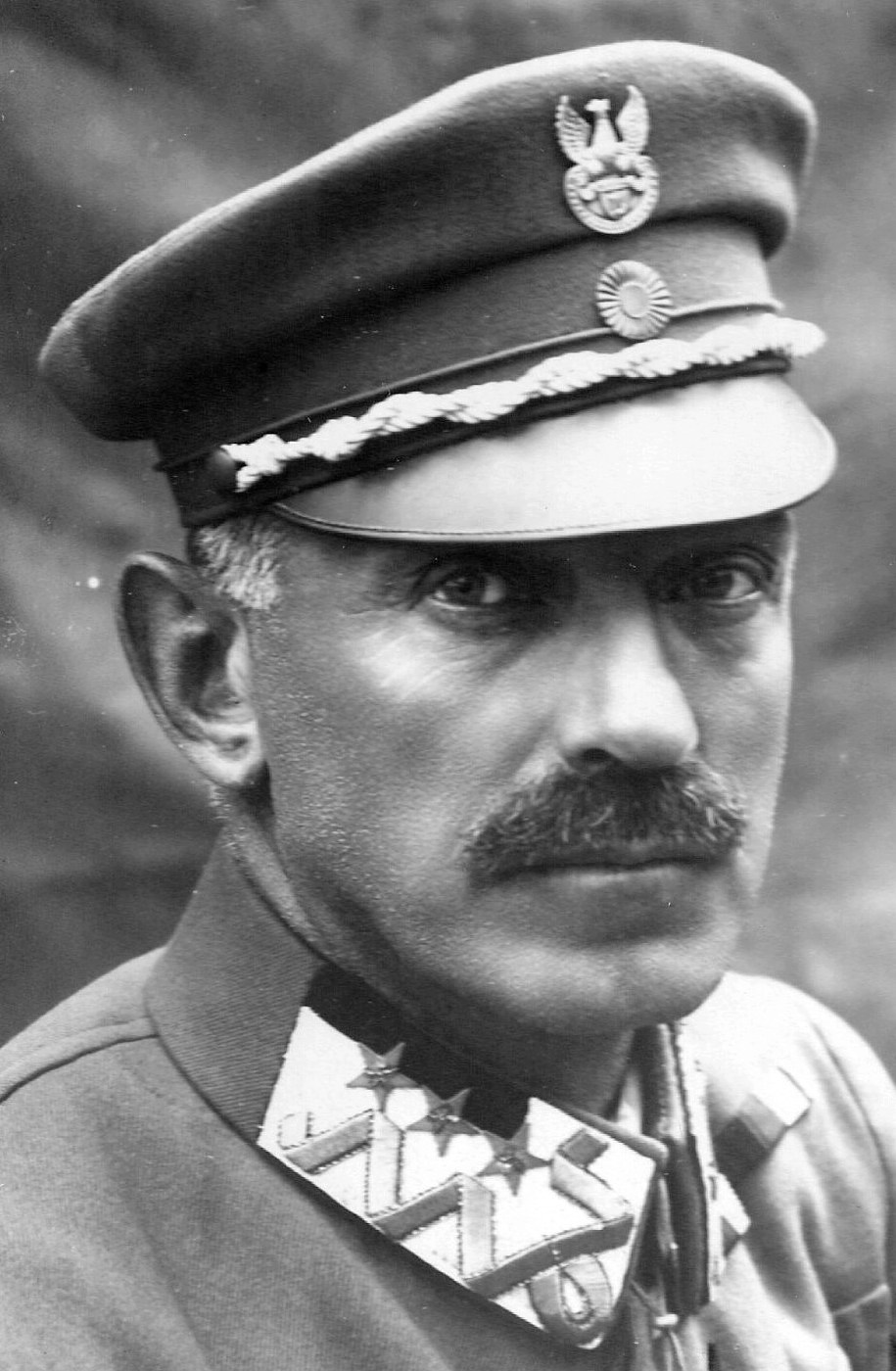
- Count-General Stanisław Szeptycki
- Born: 3 November 1867; Prylbychi, Kingdom of Galicia and Lodomeria, Austria-Hungary
- Died: 9 October 1950 (aged 82); Korczyna, Poland
- Military career
- Allegiance: Poland; Austria-Hungary
- Rank: Lieutenant General
- Conflicts: Russo-Japanese War; World War I Polish–Soviet War

Signature
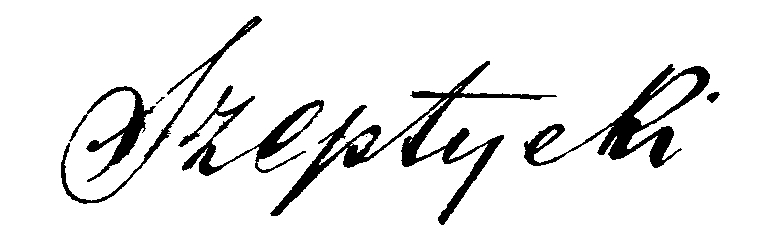

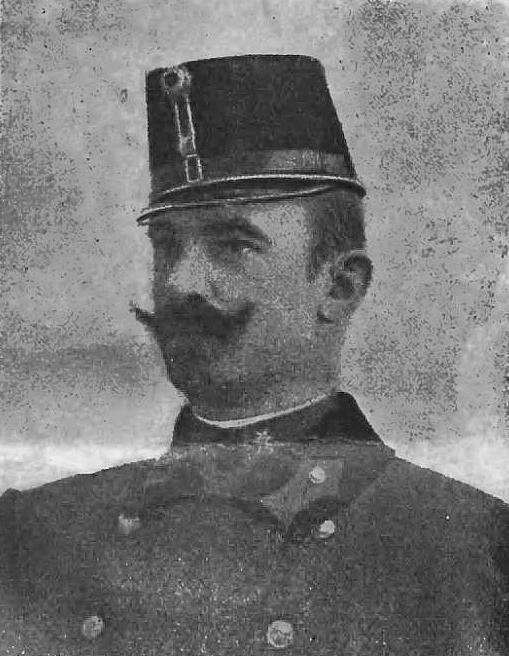
Szeptycki serving as a military attaché in Outer Manchuria during the Russo-Japanese War (1904/5)

Stanisław Maria Jan Teofil Szeptycki (3 November 1867 – 9 October 1950) was a Polish count, general and military commander.

== Biography ==
Born in 1867 in the Kingdom of Galicia and Lodomeria, part of Austria-Hungary, to the aristocratic Szeptycki family, he was the grandson of Polish playwright Aleksander Fredro, son of the count Jan Kanty Szeptycki and brother of Andrey Sheptytsky, Metropolitan Archbishop of the Ukrainian Greek Catholic Church (Stanisław was a Catholic of the Latin rite, his brother Andrey/Andrzej was also initially of the Latin Rite, but instead followed Greek Catholicism).

Szeptycki joined the Austro-Hungarian Army, where he attained the rank of colonel. In 1914 he joined the Polish Legions, where he became commander of the Third Brigade, and from November 1916 to April 1917 commander of the entire Polish Legions formation. Following the Oath Crisis he commanded the German-aligned Polnische Wehrmacht. Until February 1918 he was Austro-Hungarian governor general of Lublin, but resigned in protest when Germany turned Chełm and the surrounding area over to the Ukrainians. He joined the newly recreated Polish Armed Forces in November 1918 following the country's independence and replaced General Tadeusz Rozwadowski as Chief of the General Staff, a post that he held until March 1919.

During the Polish-Soviet War of 1919–1921, Szeptycki commanded the Polish Northeast Front and the 4th Army. In 1919 he commanded Operation Minsk. He disagreed with the Polish Commander-in-Chief, Józef Piłsudski, which cost him his post, and joined the National Democratic opposition to Piłsudski. From June to December 1923 he was Minister of Military Affairs; during that time he challenged Piłsudski to a duel for a perceived slight (Piłsudski refused the challenge).

After Piłsudski's May 1926 Coup d'État, Szeptycki was dismissed from active service. After World War II, from 1945 to 1950, he headed the Polish Red Cross (Polski Czerwony Krzyż).

He died in Korczyna in 1950.

== Promotions ==
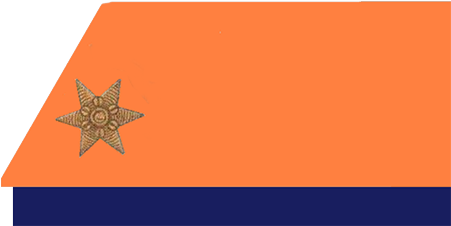
- Leutnant (Second lieutenant) - 1888
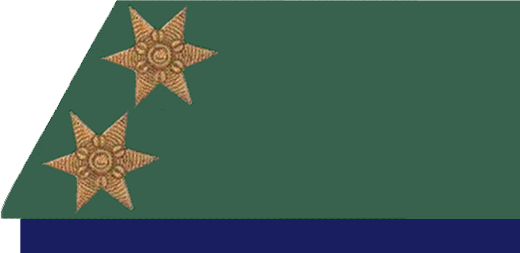
- Oberleutnant (First lieutenant) - 1892
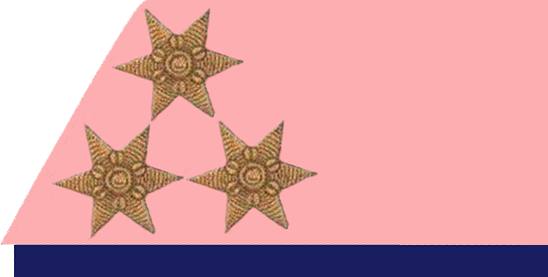
- Hauptmann (Captain) - 1900
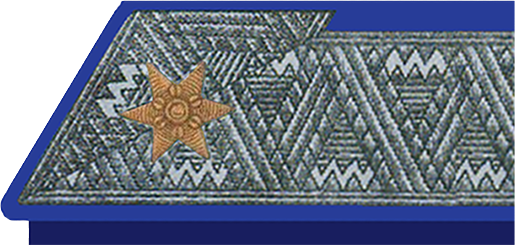
- Major (Major) - 1 November 1907
- Oberstleutnant (Lieutenant colonel) - 1 May 1911
- Oberts (Colonel) - 1 May 1914
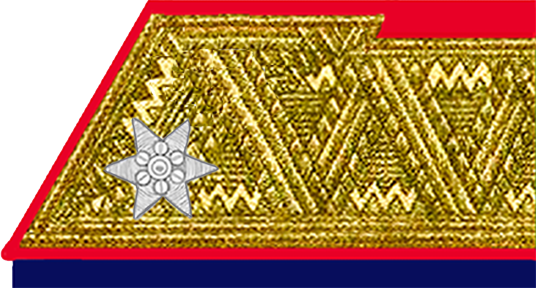
- Generalmajor (Brigadier general) - 28 April 1917
- Generał dywizji (Major general) - 4 November 1918
- Generał broni (Lieutenant general) - 21 April 1920

== Honours and awards ==
- Polish:
  - Commander's Cross of the Virtuti Militari (1922)
  - Silver Cross of the Virtuti Militari (1921)
  - Commander's Cross with Star of the Order of Polonia Restituta (7 November 1925)
  - Commander's Cross of the Order of Polonia Restituta (1921)
  - Cross of Valour, four times
  - Golden Cross of Merit
  - Commemorative Medal for the War of 1918–1921
  - Medal of the Tenth Anniversary of Regained Independence
- Austro-Hungarian:
  - Order of the Iron Crown, 2nd Class (1916)
  - Order of the Iron Crown, 3rd Class (1905)
  - Order of Leopold, 2nd Class (1914)
  - Order of Franz Joseph, 1st Class (1918)
  - Military Merit Cross, 2nd and 3rd Class (1916, 1915)
  - Decoration for Services to the Red Cross
  - Karl Troop Cross
  - 1898 Jubilee Medal
  - 1908 Jubilee Cross
- Other:
  - Order of the Crown, 2nd Class (1909, Prussia)
  - Iron Cross, 2nd Class (Prussia)
  - Military Merit Order, 2nd Class (Württemberg)
  - Order of Saint George, 2nd Class (1900, Bavaria)
  - Military Merit Order, 2nd Class (Bavaria)
  - Commander of Legion of Honour (1922, France)
  - Chevalier of Legion of Honour (1906, France)
  - Order of the Bath, CB (1921, United Kingdom)
  - Grand Cross of Order of the Star of Romania (1923, Romania)
  - Grand Cross of Order of St. Sava (1923, Yugoslavia)
  - Knight Grand Cross of Order of the Crown of Italy (1923, Kingdom of Italy)
  - Cross of Liberty, 2nd Class (1922, Estonia)
  - Order of Lāčplēsis, 2nd class (1921, Latvia)
  - Order of Saint Stanislaus, 2nd Class (1905, Russian Empire)
  - Golden Weapon for Bravery (1908, Russian Empire)

== Family ==
He was one of five sons of Jan Kanty Szeptycki and his wife Zofia Fredro.

His brothers were Andrey, Klymentiy, Leon and Aleksander.
