= David Kahane =

- דוד כהנא
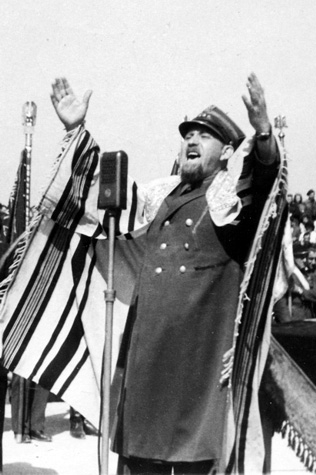
- Speaking publicly as an army officer
- Born: 15 March 1903; Grzymałów, Austrian Poland
- Died: 24 September 1998 (aged 95); Jerusalem
- Years active: 1945–1949
- Title: Naczelny rabin Wojska Polskiego (Chief Rabbi of the Polish Army)

David Kahane (Hebrew: דוד כהנא, Polish: Dawid Kahane; 15 March 1903 – 24 September 1998) was a Polish-Jewish religious teacher, doctor of philosophy, member of the Mizrachi party in Lwów and Chief Rabbi of the Polish Army. He was also the Chief Rabbi of the Israeli air force, and Chief Rabbi of Argentina between 1965 and 1975.

== Life ==
Kahane was born in Grzymałów, partitioned Poland (now Hrymailiv, Ukraine) into a religious family of the Rabbis. He studied in Berlin and in Wrocław (then Breslau). In 1923–1929, following the reconstitution of sovereign Poland, he continued his studies at the University of Vienna where he obtained the title of Doctor of Philosophy at the Israelitisch-Theologische Lehranstalt. Upon his return to Poland, Kahane joined the Mizrachi party in Lwów. He made his living as a religious teacher. Subsequently, he was appointed Rabbi of Tykocin, and in 1929–1939 the Rabbi in Ose Tow Synagogue of Lwów. He also served as director of scientific Tanakh institute locally.

Following the Nazi Operation Barbarossa and the conquest of Lwów, he was interned in the Lwów Ghetto and was active in the local religious department. His parents were murdered in Bełżec extermination camp in 1941. Prior to his deportment to Janowska concentration camp in August 1942, he managed to secure a hiding place for his three-year-old daughter. Deported to Janowska concentration camp, he escaped on 23 April 1943 and went into hiding on the 'Aryan' side. Two months after the liquidation of the Lvov ghetto, in September 1943 Kahane and 15 other Jews sheltered in Metropolitan Andrey Sheptytsky's home in Lvov. He survived the Holocaust in the General Government District of Galicia. After the Soviet takeover, in 1944 he joined the Polish People's Army in the rank of Major, and appointed chief Rabbi in 1945. Kahane protested against acts of antisemitism in Poland at the funeral of the victims of the Kielce pogrom. Following the liquidation of the Polish Army field rabbinate in 1949, Kahane left the army and emigrated to Israel.

In Israel, he became the Chief Rabbi of the Air Force. In 1967–1975 he resided in Argentina and served as Chief Rabbi of that country. He returned to Israel in 1975 and settled in Tel Aviv. He wrote memoirs in Hebrew including: Joman geto Lwow (1978); translated as the Lvov Ghetto Diary (1990); as well as the Achre(j) ha-mabul (1968). The Lvov Ghetto Diary is one of the few diaries to come out of the Lvov ghetto.

== See also ==
- List of Holocaust diarists
- Kurt I. Lewin, Przeżyłem. Saga Świętego Jura spisana w roku 1946 przez syna rabina Lwowa, Zeszyty Literackie, Warsaw 2006, ISBN 83-60046-40-9.
