= Andrey Sheptytsky =

Metropolitan Archbishop of the Ukrainian Greek Catholic Church (1865–1944)

Venerable Andrey Sheptytsky OSBM
- Metropolitan of Galicia, Archbishop of Lviv (Lemberg)
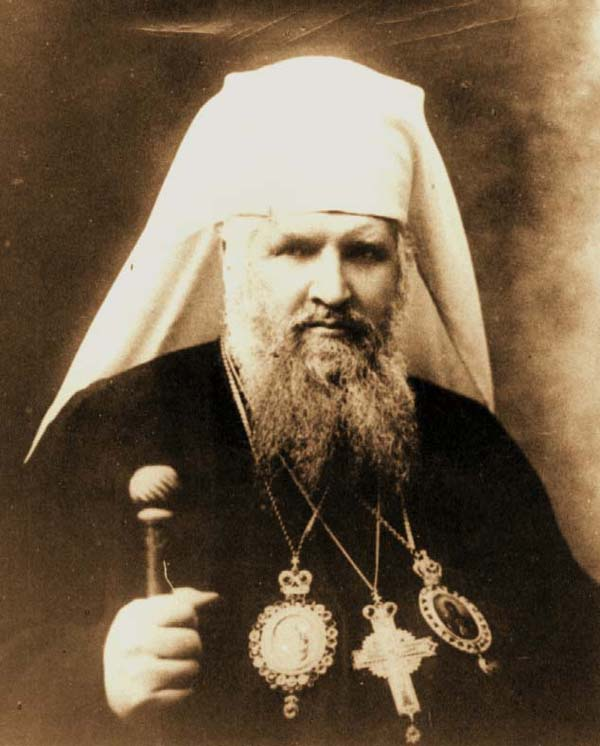
- Sheptytsky in 1921
- Church: Ukrainian Greek Catholic
- Appointed: 12 December 1900
- Installed: 17 January 1901
- Term ended: 1 November 1944
- Predecessor: Julian Sas-Kuilovsky
- Successor: Josyf Slipyj

Orders
- Ordination: 27 August 1892 (deacon); 28 August 1892 (priest) by Yulian Pelesh
- Consecration: 17 September 1899 by Julian Sas-Kuilovsky, Konstantyn Chekhovych, and Józef Weber

Personal details
- Born: Roman Aleksander Maria Szeptycki; 29 July 1865 Prylbychi, Galicia, Austrian Empire
- Died: November 1, 1944 (aged 79) Lviv, Lviv Oblast, Ukrainian SSR, Soviet Union
- Buried: St. George's Cathedral, Lviv, Ukraine; 49°50′19.48″N 24°0′46.19″E
- Coat of arms: Andrey Sheptytsky's coat of arms

Ordination history
History
Diaconal ordination
- Ordained by: Bishop Yulian Pelesh
- Date: 27 August 1892
Priestly ordination
- Ordained by: Bishop Yulian Pelesh
- Date: 28 August 1892
Episcopal consecration
- Principal consecrator: Archbishop Julian Sas-Kuilovsky
- Co-consecrators: Bishop Konstantyn Chekhovych and Bishop Józef Weber
- Date: 17 September 1899
- Place: Resurrection Cathedral, Stanisławów
Episcopal succession
Bishops consecrated by Andrey Sheptytsky as principal consecrator
- Hryhoriy Khomyshyn: 19 June 1904
- Soter Ortynsky: 12 May 1907
- Nykyta Budka: 13 October 1912
- Josyf Botsyan: 21 September 1914
- Josaphat Kotsylovsky: 23 September 1917
- Ivan Buchko: 20 October 1929
- Ivan Lyatyshevskyi: 26 January 1930
- Josyf Slipyj: 22 December 1939

I am Ukrainian from my grandfather, great-grandfather. And our church and our holy ritual I love with all my heart devoting to the Lord's affair my whole life. So I know that in this regard I could not be foreign to people who have given their heart and soul for the same cause.

— Andrey Sheptytsky, Pastoral letters, 2 August 1899.

Andrey Sheptytsky OSBM (Polish: Andrzej Szeptycki; Ukrainian: Андрей Шептицький, romanized: Andrey Sheptytsky; 29 July 1865 – 1 November 1944) was a prelate and theologian of the Ukrainian Greek Catholic Church who served as Metropolitan of Galicia and Archbishop of Lviv from 1901 until his death in 1944. His tenure in office spanned two world wars and seven political regimes: Austrian, Russian, Ukrainian, Polish, Soviet, Nazi German, and again Soviet.

He was born as Roman Szeptycki in Prylbychi, a village outside of Lviv in the Kingdom of Galicia and Lodomeria (Austrian Galicia), to on his father's side the Roman Catholic Szeptycki family who were part of the Polish szlachta (nobility) of Ruthenian origin, and on his mother's side to the very famous in Poland Fredro family, who also were part of the Roman Catholic Polish szlachta. Although he was baptized in the Latin Church, Sheptytsky joined the Greek-Catholic Order of Saint Basil the Great in 1888, and took the monastic name Andrey. In 1892 he took his solemn vows and was also ordained to the deaconate and the priesthood. He went on to serve as a hegumen and seminary professor in the Basilian Order. In 1899 Sheptytsky was nominated by Emperor Franz Joseph to become the Bishop of Stanislau, and his consecration took place that year. In 1900 he was selected to be the Metropolitan Archbishop of Galicia (also the leading bishop of the Ukrainian Greek Catholic Church), and he was enthroned in 1901.

Sheptytsky had a major role in raising Ukrainian national consciousness in modern-day western Ukraine and expanded the Ukrainian Catholic Church. He defended the interests of Ukrainians to the Austro-Hungarian House of Lords and Emperor Franz Joseph, established schools and a hospital society, and founded a seminary and the order of the Ukrainian Studite Monks. He also facilitated the appointment of the Ukrainian Catholic hierarchy for Ukrainian immigrants in Canada and the United States. Sheptytsky was a member of the National Council of the Western Ukrainian People's Republic after World War I, and when Galicia became part of Poland, he defended the Ukrainian Orthodox from persecution. He also became the main sponsor of the nascent Russian Greek Catholic Church in 1907 with the approval of the Holy See, and was responsible for the Russian Catholic hierarchy until shortly before his death.

According to the church historian Jaroslav Pelikan, "Arguably, Metropolitan Andrey Sheptytsky was the most influential figure ...in the entire history of the Ukrainian Church in the twentieth century". Several locations and organizations in Ukraine have been named after him, including the city of Sheptytskyi in Lviv Oblast and the Andrey Sheptytsky National Museum of Ukrainian culture in the city of Lviv. In 2015, Pope Francis recognized his life as one of heroic virtue by declaring him Venerable.

== Life ==
=== Early life and education ===
He was born as Count Roman Aleksander Maria Szeptycki in Prylbychi, a village 40 km west/northwest of Lviv, in the Kingdom of Galicia and Lodomeria, then a crownland of the Austrian Empire. His parents were Jan Kanty Szeptycki and Zofia née Fredro.

The Szeptycki family was part of the Polish szlachta of Ruthenian origin. The maternal Fredro family was descended from the Polish nobility and, through his mother, the future Metropolitan Bishop was the grandson of Polish Romantic poet Aleksander Fredro. The Szeptycki family produced a number of bishops of both Catholic rites, most notably in the 18th century. Greek Catholic Bishops of Lviv and Metropolitans of Kiev were: Athanasius and Leo, Barlaam Bazyli was also bishop of Lviv. Atanazy Andrzej was a Greek Catholic bishop of Przemyśl and Nikifor was archimanrite of Lavriv. The Latin Catholic Bishop of Płock was Hieronim Antoni Szeptycki, while his nephew Marcin was elected to the position, but did not take it. One of his brothers, Klymentiy Sheptytsky, M.S.U., became a Studite monk, and another, Stanisław Szeptycki, became a General in the Polish Army. His brothers Leon and Aleksander died during WWII.

He was 2 m 10 cm (6 ft. 10 in.) tall.

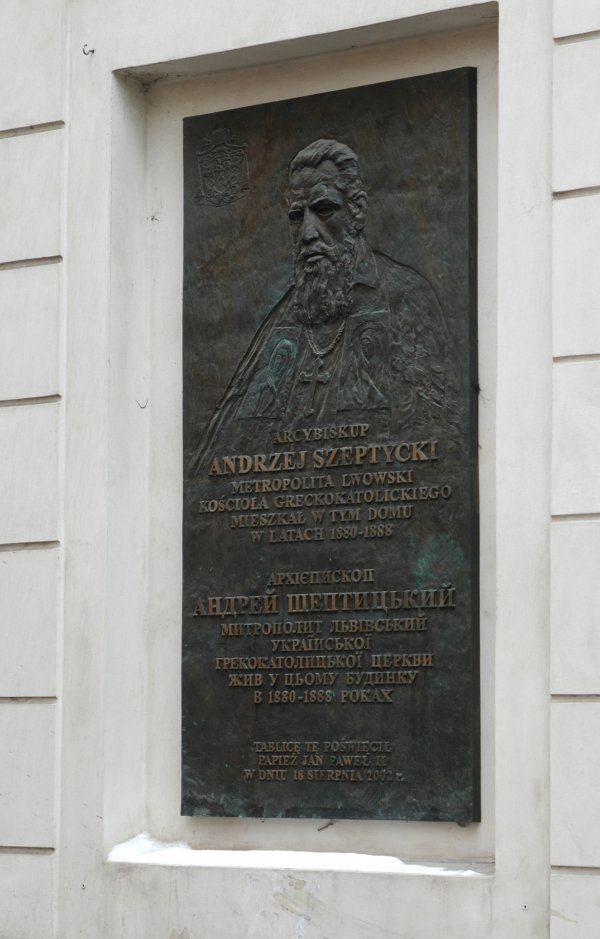
Memorial plaque in Kraków, marking the place where Szeptycki lived during the 1880s

Sheptytsky was baptized in the Roman rite at the parish church in Bruchnal (today Ternovytsia). Sheptytsky received his education first at home and then in Lviv and later in Kraków. He graduated from the St. Anna gymnasium in Kraków on 11 June 1883. His confessor was Jesuit Henry Nostitz-Jackowski, who was carrying out the reform of the Greek Catholic Basilian Order in Galicia. Probably under his influence, Sheptyskiy made the decision to join the Basilians, which, however, provoked opposition from his father. Hence in 1883 he went to serve in the Austro-Hungarian Army but after a few months he fell sick and was forced to abandon it.

Instead, he went to study law in Breslau. There he was a member of the Literary and Slavic Society run by Władysław Nehring, as well as the Upper Silesian Society and the Polish Academicians' Reading Room. With his brother Alexander, he founded the Polish-Catholic Student Theological Society "Societas Hosiana" in 1884. From the 1885/6 academic year, he continued his studies at the Jagiellonian University in Kraków, at which time he changed his nationality declaration from "Polish" to "Ruthenian". In April and May 1886 he visited Rome. From November to December 1887 he stayed in Kyiv and then in Moscow. Together with his mother and brother Leone he was granted an audience on March 24, 1888, with Pope Leo XIII at the Vatican. The Pope blessed his intention to join the Basilians, and on May 19, 1888, he received his doctorate.

According to his biographer Fr. Cyril Korolevsky, Sheptytsky's lifelong dream of creating the Russian Greek Catholic Church as a means of reuniting the Russian people with the Holy See goes back at least to his first trip to Russia in 1887. Afterwards, Sheptytsky "wrote some reflections" between October and November 1887, and expressed his belief, "that the Great Schism, which became definitive in Russia in the fifteenth century, was a bad tree, and it was useless to keep cutting the branches without uprooting the trunk itself, because the branches would always grow back." Sheptytsky likely spoke about his desire to bring Russia to Catholicism during his audience with Pope Leo XIII in 1888, and it was one of the factors that influenced his decision to become an Eastern Catholic despite his family's Polish and Latin Church background. A monk who later became his aide wrote in 1933 that Sheptytsky "never turned his eyes away from the conversion of Russia."

=== Religious and political life ===
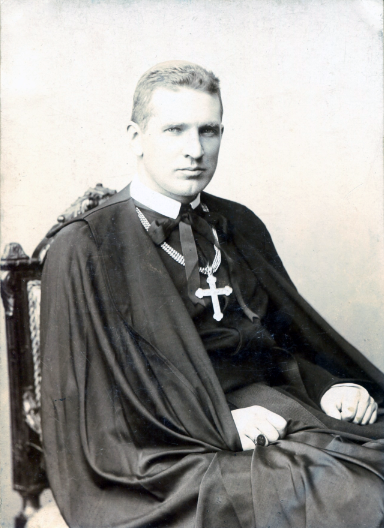
Sheptytsky c. late 1880s or early 1890s

Sheptytsky became a novice at the Basilian monastery in Dobromyl on May 29, 1888. He took the name Andrey, after the younger brother of Saint Peter, Andrew the Apostle, considered the founder of the Byzantine Church and also specifically of the Ukrainian Church. Beginning in 1889, he studied Ukrainian there under Wojciech Baudiss. He then studied at the Jesuit College in Kraków, passing the exam in 1894. Sheptytsky became a professed member of the Order of Saint Basil the Great on August 13, 1889, and took his solemn vows on August 11, 1892. He was ordained a deacon and a priest on August 27 and 28, 1892, in Przemyśl. He was made hegumen of the Monastery of St Onuphrius in Lviv in 1896. In 1898, he took up the post of professor of moral and dogmatic theology at the Basilian seminary in Krystynopol. There he founded the Studite Order, based on the rule of St. Theodore the Studite, which had been introduced to the Kievan Rus' in the 11th century. The formation of the Studite order was part of Sheptytsky's effort to restore Byzantine traditions within the Ukrainian Church and to link modern monasticism with the historic Kievan Rus'. He also hoped that it would make the monasticism of Ukrainian Greek Catholics more like that of the Orthodox.

In 1899, following the death of Cardinal Sylwester Sembratowicz, Sheptytsky was nominated by Emperor Franz Joseph to fill the vacant position of Greek Catholic Bishop of Stanyslaviv (now Ivano-Frankivsk), and Pope Leo XIII concurred. Thus he was consecrated as bishop in Lviv on 17 September 1899 by Metropolitan Julian Sas-Kuilovsky assisted by Bishop Chekhovych and Bishop Weber, the Latin-Rite auxiliary of Lviv. On February 5 of that year, he received a doctorate in theological sciences in Rome, nostrified at the Faculty of Theology of the Jagiellonian University. A year later, following the death of Julian Sas-Kuilovsky, Sheptytsky was appointed, at the age of thirty-six, Metropolitan of Halych, Archbishop of Lviv and Bishop of Kamenets-Podolsk; he was enthroned on 17 January 1901. From February 1901, he sat with the House of Lords of the Imperial Council in Vienna with the title of secret counselor. He also became deputy speaker of the Galician Diet, a position he held until 1912.

He was active in promoting the revival and expansion of the Eastern Catholic Churches in the territory of Russian Empire, visiting incognito that country several times and secretly ordaining bishops and priests there. He also took an active part in the Velehrad congresses. He also strove for the revival of the Belarusian Greek Catholic Church, and to this end contacted important leaders of the movement for Belarusian nationalism, including Ivan Lutskevich.

Sheptytsky supported the Ukrainian national movement, founding a Greek Catholic seminary in Stanislaviv, supported the opening of a Ukrainian gymnasium there, and a Ukrainian university and hospital in Lviv. He sponsored an exhibition of Ukrainian artists in Lviv in 1905, led a Ukrainian pilgrimage to Palestine, and led a Ukrainian delegation to Emperor Franz Joseph seeking reform of the electoral law. At the same time, he sought to prevent Polish-Ukrainian nationalist conflicts in Galicia. In 1904, he issued a pastoral letter to Polish Greek Catholics, urging them to love their own nation and warning against harming others under the guise of patriotism. In 1908, he harshly condemned the assassination of Galician governor Andrzej Kazimierz Potocki by Ukrainian student Myroslav Sichinskyi.

Sheptytsky visited North America in 1910 where he met with Ukrainian Greek Catholic immigrant communities in the United States; attended the twenty-first International Eucharistic Congress in Montreal; toured Ukrainian communities in Canada; and invited the Redemptorist fathers ministering in the Byzantine rite to come to Ukraine.

In the spring of 1914, the Austrian government lobbied for the Holy See to make Sheptytsky a cardinal, but this was not done.

=== World War I ===
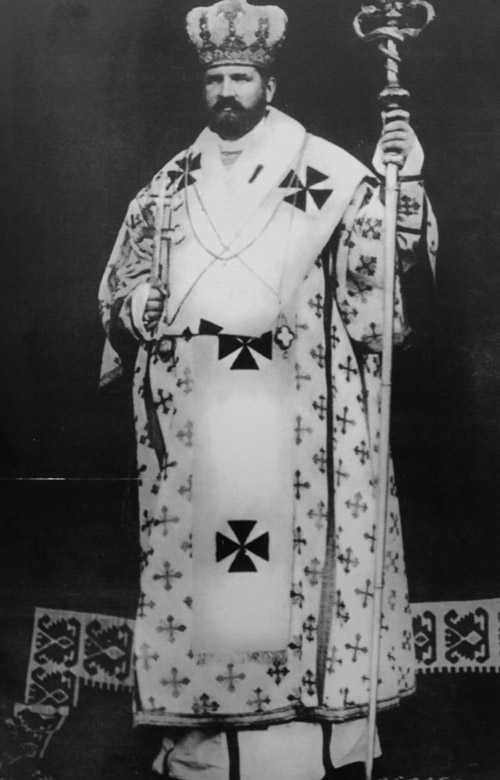
Sheptytsky in 1917

After the outbreak of World War I, Sheptytsky proposed eventual creation of the Ukrainian state out of the Russian territories, he also appealed to believers to stay loyal to the emperor of Austria. When Russians entered Lviv Sheptytsky voluntarily agreed to become a hostage, but his offer was refused by the newly appointed Russian military governor. Soon thereafter, Aleksei Brusilov, commander of the Russian 8th Army, appointed the metropolitan responsible for public order in the city. However, on September 15, 1914, Sheptytskyi was put under house arrest, and in a few days sent to Kyiv, where he arrived on 21 September. While staying there he tried to recreate the Union by consecrating Josyf Botsyan as bishop of Lutsk. For this activity, he was deported to Nizhny Novgorod, then Kursk, after that to monastery of Saint Euthymius in Suzdal and finally to Yaroslav.

During his time in exile Sheptytsky spent time reading and bought a number of antique items for the National Museum in Lviv. He was allowed to pray and regularly visited a Catholic church for confession. Released in March 1917 by the Russian Provisional Government, Sheptytsky left for Petrograd for medical treatment, and later visited Kyiv, where he served a mass. After passing through Finland, Sweden, Germany and Switzerland, in September 1917 the metropolitan returned to Lviv, where he was greeted by Archduke Wilhelm of Austria. Donations gathered in honour of his arrival were spent for the support of war orphans. During the Polish-Soviet War the Bolsheviks destroyed the rural house of Sheptytskyi's parents in Prylbychi, where he was born. During the destruction the family archives were lost.

=== Interwar period ===
Sheptytsky again visited the United States in 1920. In 1921 he was appointed apostolic visitor by the Pope, representing Vatican before the Red Cross and other humanitarian organizations tasked with aiding orphans and other victims of the recent war. In the United States the metropolitan had an audience with president Warren G. Harding and met with Ukrainian diplomats, voicing his opposition to the annexation of Eastern Galicia to Poland. As a result, Polish authorities started collecting compromising information against Sheptytskyi and the Polish press declared him a traitor, despite the fact that the metropolitan's own brother Stanisław was serving as the country's defence minister during that time. Fearing Sheptytskyi's influence in Galicia, Polish authorities offered the Vatican to appoint him to a position in Rome or in North America. Nevertheless, Sheptytskyi took a decision to return, an in August 1923 crossed the Polish border. Immediately thereafter he was arrested and spent six weeks isolated in Poznań. Finally, after a meeting with Polish president Stanisław Wojciechowski, the metropolitan was allowed to proceed to Lviv, where he arrived in early October.

Between 1923 and 1935 Sheptytskyi sponsored an art school in Lviv, which was established by painter Oleksa Novakivskyi and employed notable Ukrainian artists including Osyp Kurylas, Stepan Baley, Ivan Rakovskyi, Yevhen Nahirnyi, Volodymyr Peshchanskyi, Volodymyr Zalozetskyi and Ilarion Svientsitskyi. Twice a month, the metropolitan himself gave lectures at the establishment.

=== World War II ===
After the German invasion of Poland, Sheptytsky issued a pastoral letter appealing not to succumb to propaganda. On October 9, 1939, after the Soviets took over eastern Poland, without the consent of the Holy See, he created a new territorial division of the Greco-Catholic Church on the territory of the USSR. During the Soviet rule, he tried to keep the Greco-Catholics out of control by the Soviet state. He protested the atheization of youth, organized synods and secretly ordained bishops. He also contacted the Polish underground (ZWZ) to ease Polish-Ukrainian relations.

Sheptytsky welcomed the Wehrmacht entering Lviv and supported the OUN-B's declaration of Ukrainian independence on June 30, 1941. After the dissolution of Yaroslav Stetsko's government, he became honorary chairman of the Ukrainian Council of Seniors. On July 22, 1941, in a letter to Joachim von Ribbentrop, Germany's foreign minister, he protested against the annexation of Eastern Galicia to the General Government. In August 1941, he assumed the protectorate of the newly established Ukrainian Red Cross. Gradually, he developed a dislike for the Nazi Party, being disgusted by their policies toward the civilian population. In June 1942, he promulgated the document The Ideal of Our National Life, in which he presented a vision of an independent, united Ukraine united by a single Church in union with the Holy See. In February 1942, he signed a letter to Adolf Hitler issued by the OUN-M opposing German policies and demanding the establishment of an independent Ukraine. Nevertheless, in the summer of 1943, Sheptytsky appointed chaplains for the forming Ukrainian SS-Volunteer Division Galicia.

Sheptytsky initially supported the SS Galicia Division, even blessing new recruits. He reportedly told Volodymyr Kubiyovych, who was helping organize it, that "there is virtually no price which should not be paid for the creation of a Ukrainian army." According to his close friend Rabbi David Kahane, however, Sheptytsky had believed that the Division would be used to fight Stalinism and personally expressed disgust in a conversation with the Rabbi about the Division's subsequent role as perpetrators of the Holocaust in Ukraine.

Also in February 1942, Sheptytsky sent a letter to Heinrich Himmler protesting the Holocaust. During World War II, he saved at least 150-200 Jews, mainly children, by hiding them in Greek Catholic orphanages, monasteries, and convents, where they were trained in how to pass as Greek Catholics. He collaborated in this work with the superiors of the Studite orders, Sister Josefa (Helena Witter) and his brother Klymentiy Sheptytsky. At his archbishop's residence in Lviv, he gave shelter to Kurt Lewin, the son of Jecheskiel Lewin, the chief rabbi of the Lviv progressive synagogue.

In August 1942, Sheptytsky sent a letter to Pius XII in which he reported on the brutal Nazi policies and unequivocally condemned the murder of Jews, and also admitted that his original assessment of the Germans' attitude toward Ukrainians was wrong. He also issued on November 21, 1942, the pastoral letter, "Thou Shalt Not Kill", to protest Nazi atrocities.

According to historian Ronald Rychlak, "A German Foreign Office agent named 'Frederic' was sent in a tour through various Nazi-occupied and satellite countries during the war. He wrote in his confidential report to the German Foreign Office on September 19, 1943, that Metropolitan Archbishop Andrey Sheptytsky, of the Ukrainian Greek Catholic Church, remained adamant in saying that the killing of Jews was an inadmissible act. 'Frederic' went on to comment that Sheptytsky made the same statements and used the same phrasing as the French, Belgian, and Dutch bishops, as if they were all receiving instructions from the Vatican."

One of the rabbis whose life was saved by Metropolitan Sheptytsky, David Kahane, stated: "Andrew Sheptytsky deserves the undying gratitude of the Jews and the honorific title 'Prince of the Righteous'". In addition, among the Jews who, thanks to Sheptytsky's help, survived the war were Lili Pohlmann and her mother, Adam Daniel Rotfeld (later Poland's foreign minister), two sons of the chief rabbi of Katowice (including the prominent cardiac surgeon Leon Chameides).

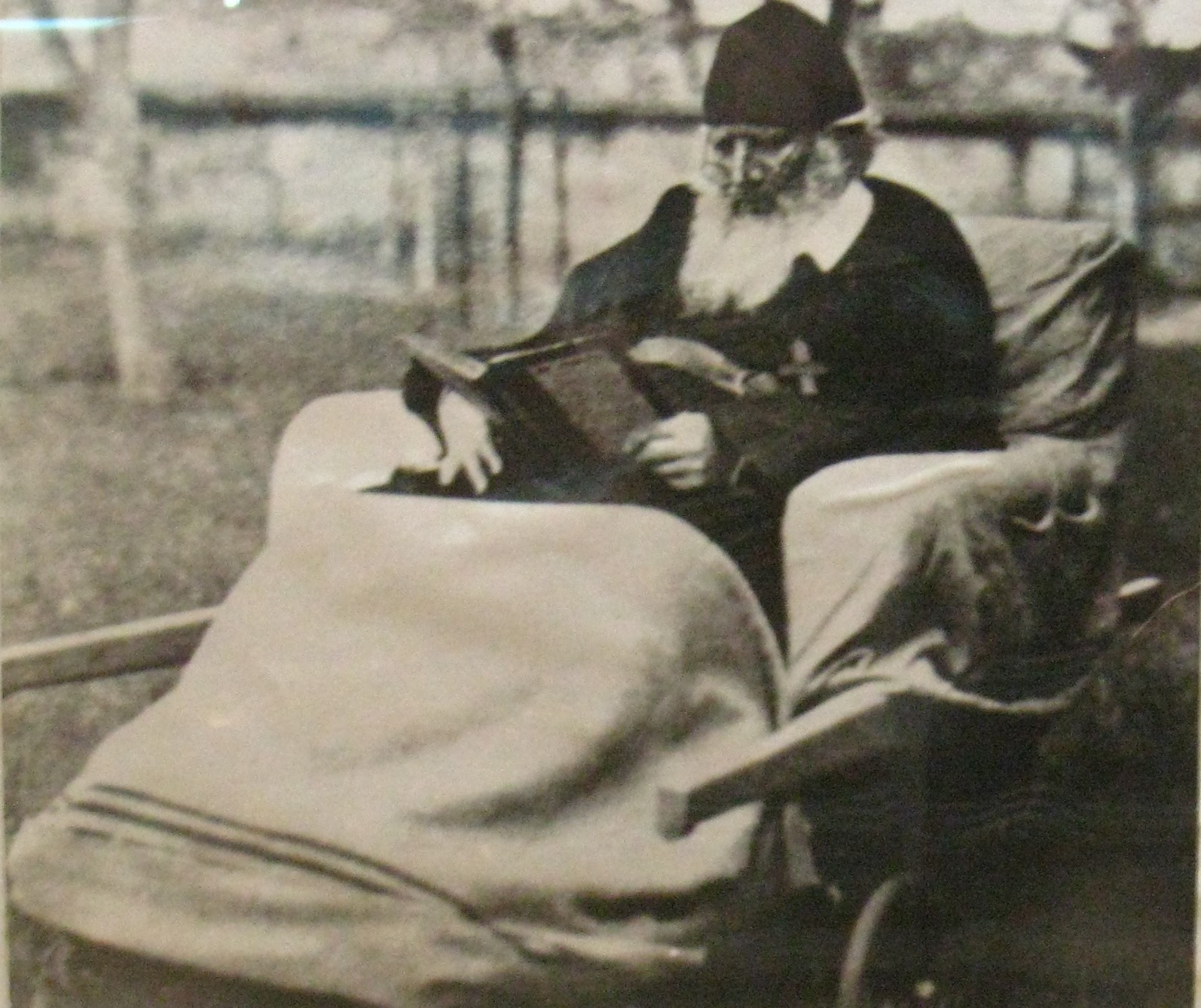
Sheptytskyi during his later years

Sheptytsky maintained contacts with the Polish underground and tried to mediate in the Polish-Ukrainian conflict. In the autumn of 1941, he met with Jerzy Braun, an envoy of Government Delegate for Poland Cyryl Ratajski and General Stefan Rowecki, Commander-in-Chief of the ZWZ, to whom he made a proposal to delegate two Ukrainian representatives to the National Council in London. Sheptytsky was aware of the ongoing genocide of the Polish population organized by the forces of OUN-B and the UPA since the summer of 1943. He did not condemn it outright, but in a pastoral letter of August 10, 1943, he called for saving the lives of those in danger, and in another of August 31, he urged both sides to stop fighting. In early 1944, he condemned the killings and their perpetrators, regardless of their motives. In a "word for Easter" dated April 16, 1944, he called for harmony between neighbors.

During this period he secretly consecrated Josyf Slipyj as his successor. Sheptytsky died on November 1, 1944, and was buried in St. George's Cathedral in Lviv. Due to the metropolitan's high authority in Galicia, the Soviets were forced to allow a public funeral, which was attended by thousands of people. On 12 November Josyp Slipyj was consecrated as the new metropolitan. However, soon thereafter Soviet authorities started their campaign to liquidate the Ukrainian Greek Catholic Church. In March 1946, during the so-called "Lviv Synod", it was officially declared part of the Russian Orthodox Church, forcing millions of its members to continue their worship in the underground.

== Views ==
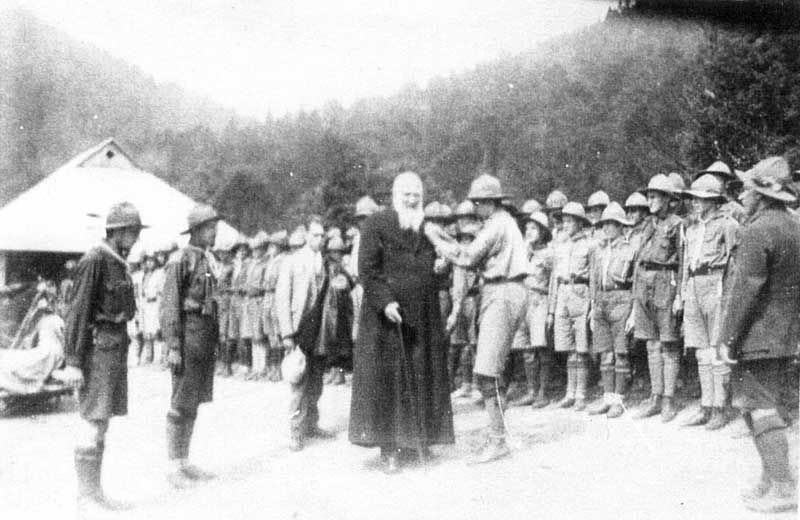
Sheptytsky visiting a Plast camp in 1930

Sheptytsky in the early years of his episcopacy expressed strong support for a celibate Eastern Catholic clergy. Yet he said to have changed his mind after years in Imperial Russian prisons where he encountered the faithfulness of married Russian and Ukrainian Orthodox priests and their wives and families. After this, he fought Latin Catholic leaders who attempted to require clerical celibacy among Eastern Catholic priests.

Sheptytsky was also a patron of artists, students, including many Orthodox Christians, and a pioneer of ecumenism—he also opposed the Second Polish Republic's policies of linguistic imperialism, coercive Polonisation, and the forced conversion of Greek Catholic and Orthodox Ukrainians into Latin Rite Catholics. He strove for reconciliation between ethnic groups and wrote frequently on social issues and spirituality.

Despite being born into wealth, he chose to live a life of poverty. He also founded the Studite and Ukrainian Redemptorist orders, a free hospital, the National Museum, and the Theological Academy. He actively supported various Ukrainian organizations such as the Prosvita and in particular, the Plast Ukrainian Scouting Organization, and donated a campsite in the Carpathian Mountains called Sokil and became the patron of the Plast fraternity Orden Khrestonostsiv.

== Commemoration and legacy ==
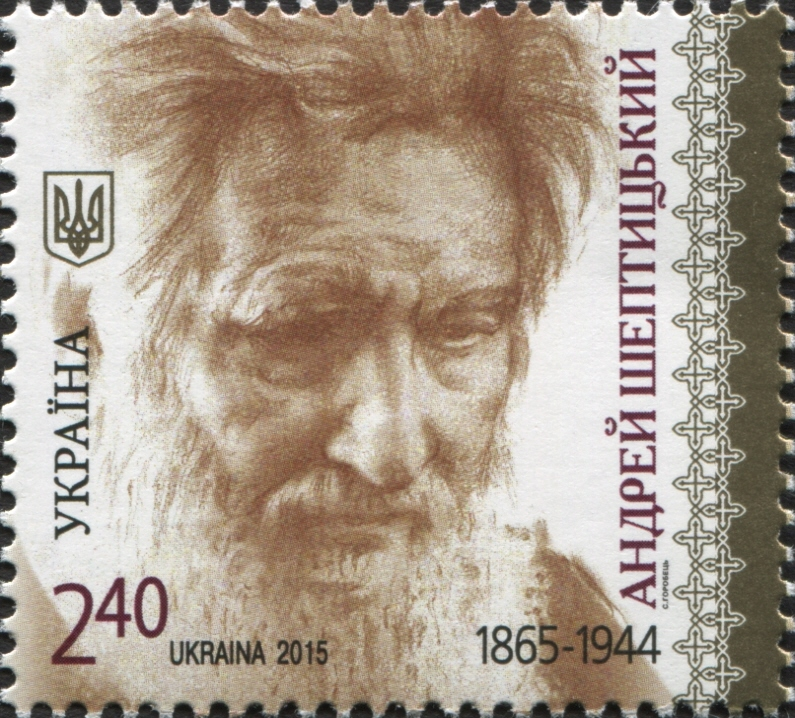
A 2015 Ukrainian stamp depicting Sheptytsky

Sheptytsky's authority as head of the Uniate Chuch influenced political attitudes to his figure even after the metropolitan's death. In Soviet propaganda he would be depicted as a supporter of Fascism and "loyal dog of the Vatican", and various objects related to his figure would be systematically eliminated due to being classified as related to Ukrainian nationalism. Alone in the National Museum of Lviv, over 90 portraits and sculptural depictions of Sheptytsky were confiscated and destroyed in 1952. Only a few lifetime portraits of the metropolitan survived the Soviet period by being transported abroad or ending up in private art collections.

Jews who were saved thanks to actions of Andrey Sheptytsky have lobbied Yad Vashem for years to have him named Righteous Among the Nations, just as his brother Klymentiy Sheptytsky had been, but so far Yad Vashem has not done so, mostly due to concerns with his initial belief that German invaders would be better for Ukraine than the Soviet Union had been. In 1958 the cause for his canonization was begun, but stalled at the behest of Cardinal Stefan Wyszynski. Pope Francis approved his life as being one of heroic virtue on 16 July 2015, thus proclaiming him to be Venerable, the first step towards sainthood.

The first monument to Metropolitan Andrey Sheptytsky was erected during his lifetime in 1932. It was destroyed by the Soviets in 1939. A new monument to Metropolitan Andrey Sheptytsky was inaugurated in Lviv on 29 July 2015, the 150th anniversary of his birth.

Shepytsky is considered to be, alongside Metropolitan Eugene Hackmann of Bukovina, one of the most important religious figures of modern Ukraine. The Lviv National Museum, founded by Sheptytsky in 1905, now bears his name. The Information-Resource Center of the Ukrainian Catholic University that was opened in September 2017 also bears his name — The Metropolitan Andrey Sheptytsky Center.

On 23 August 2024, the 103rd Territorial Defense Brigade of the Armed Forces of Ukraine was named in his honor by a decree of President Volodymyr Zelenskyy. On 19 September 2024, the Verkhovna Rada of Ukraine voted to rename the city of Chervonohrad to Sheptytskyi in his honor as a part of the derussification campaign.

== Images ==
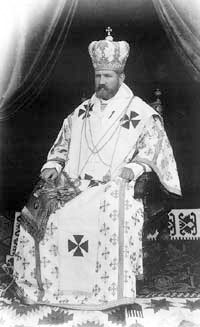
Sheptytsky on his throne wearing a mitre

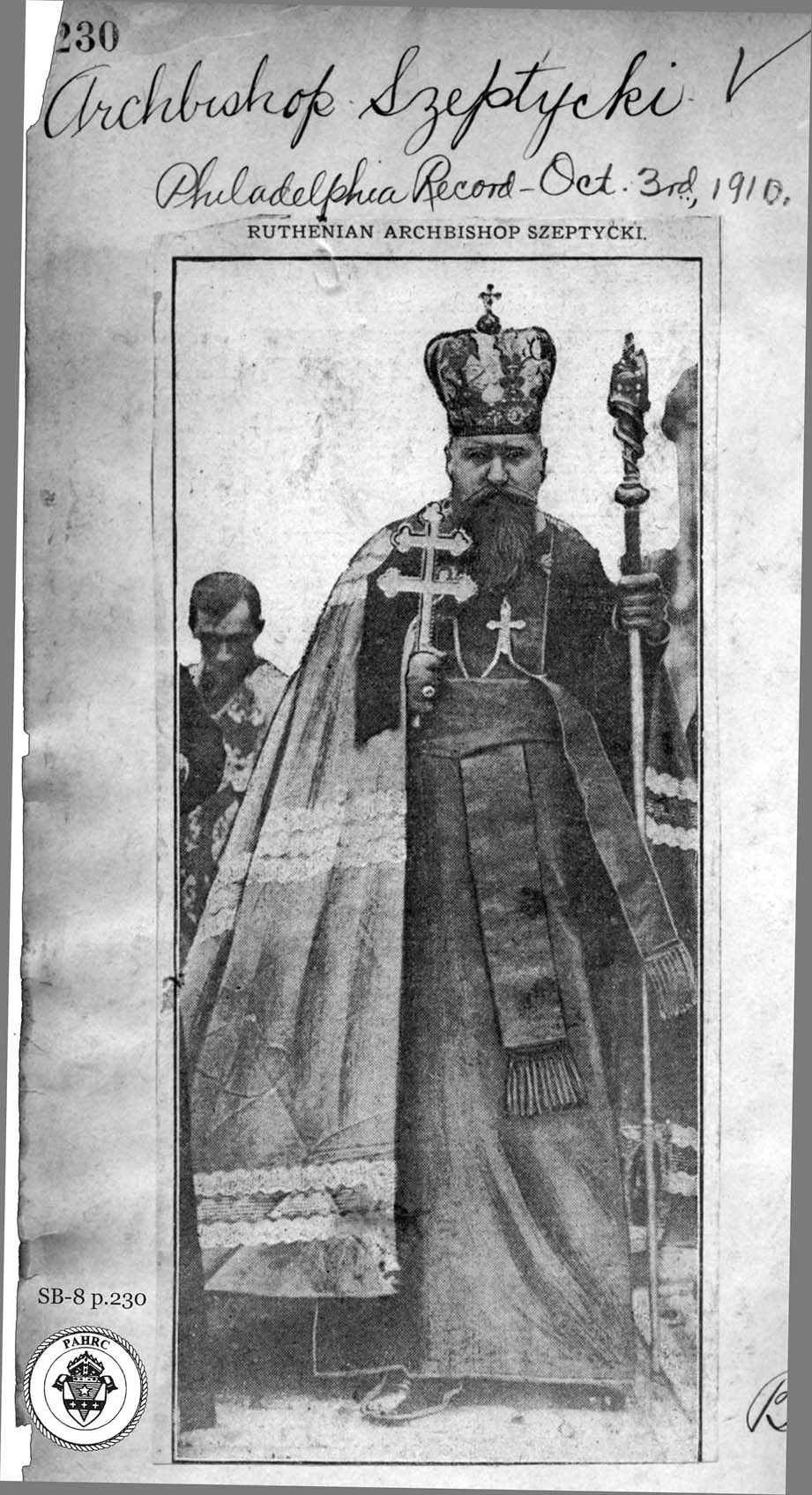
Archbishop in Philadelphia, October 1910

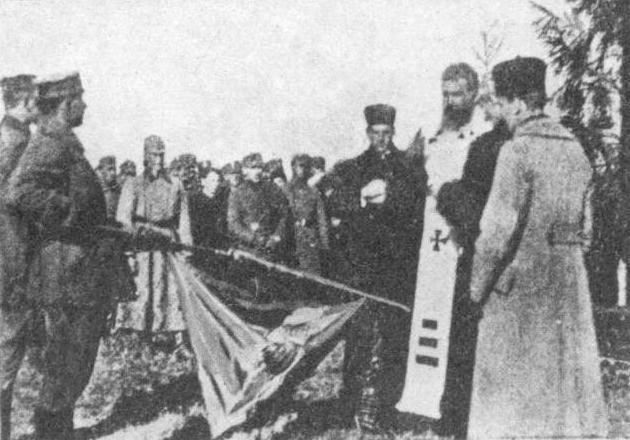
Sheptytsky blessing the banner of Ukrainian Sich Riflemen in 1917

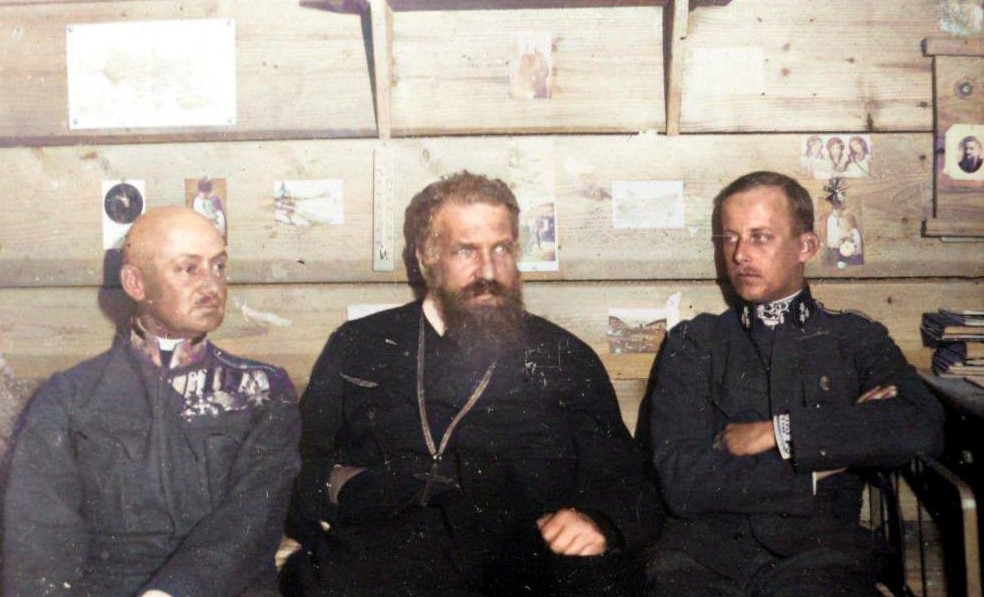
With baron Kazymyr Guzhkovsky and Archduke Wilhelm of Austria in 1918

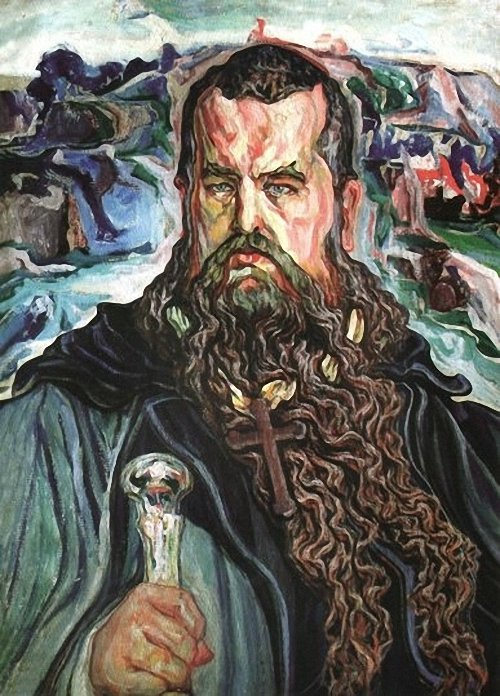
Portrait of Sheptytsky by Oleksa Novakivskyi

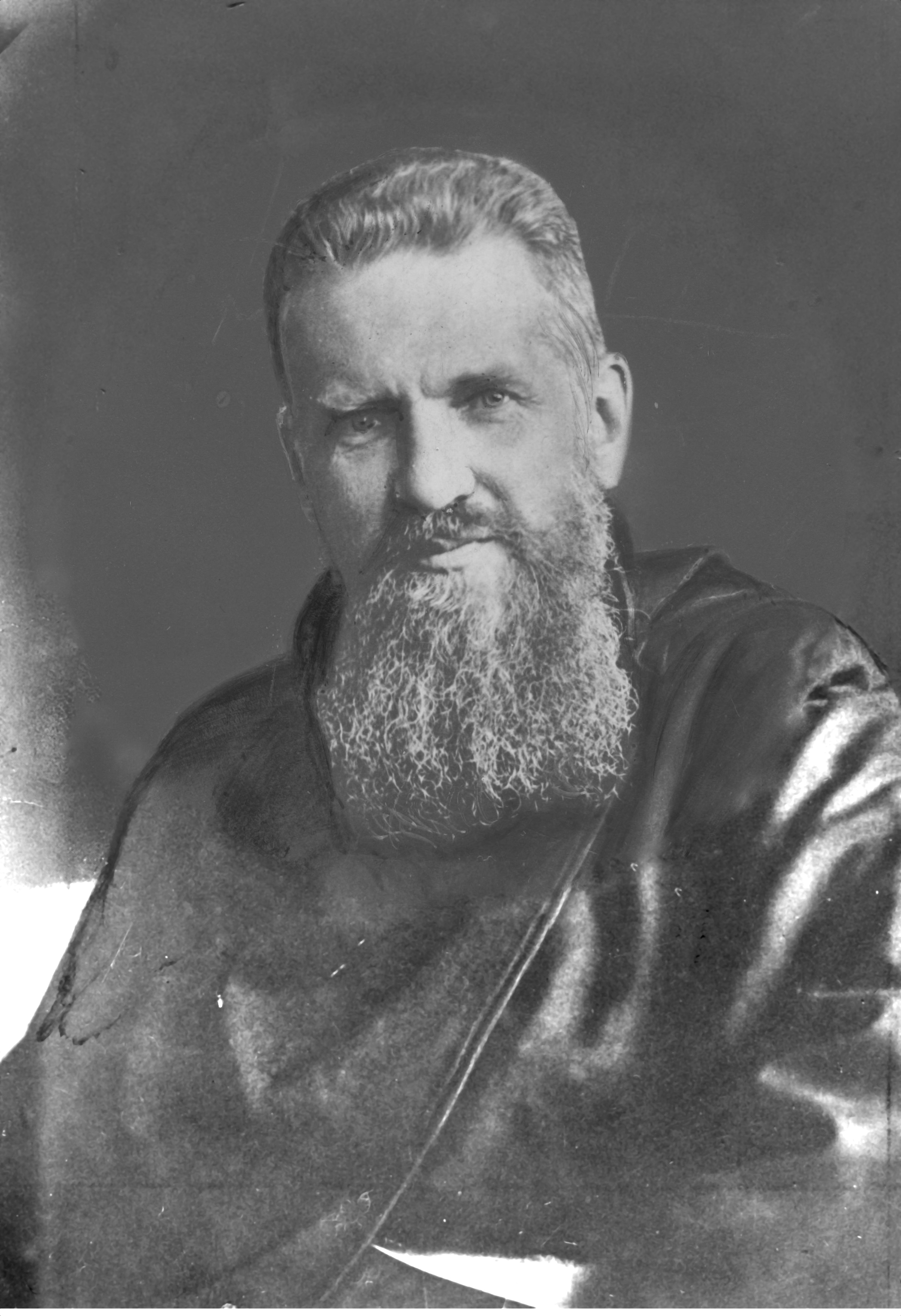
Sheptytsky on a photo published in 1939

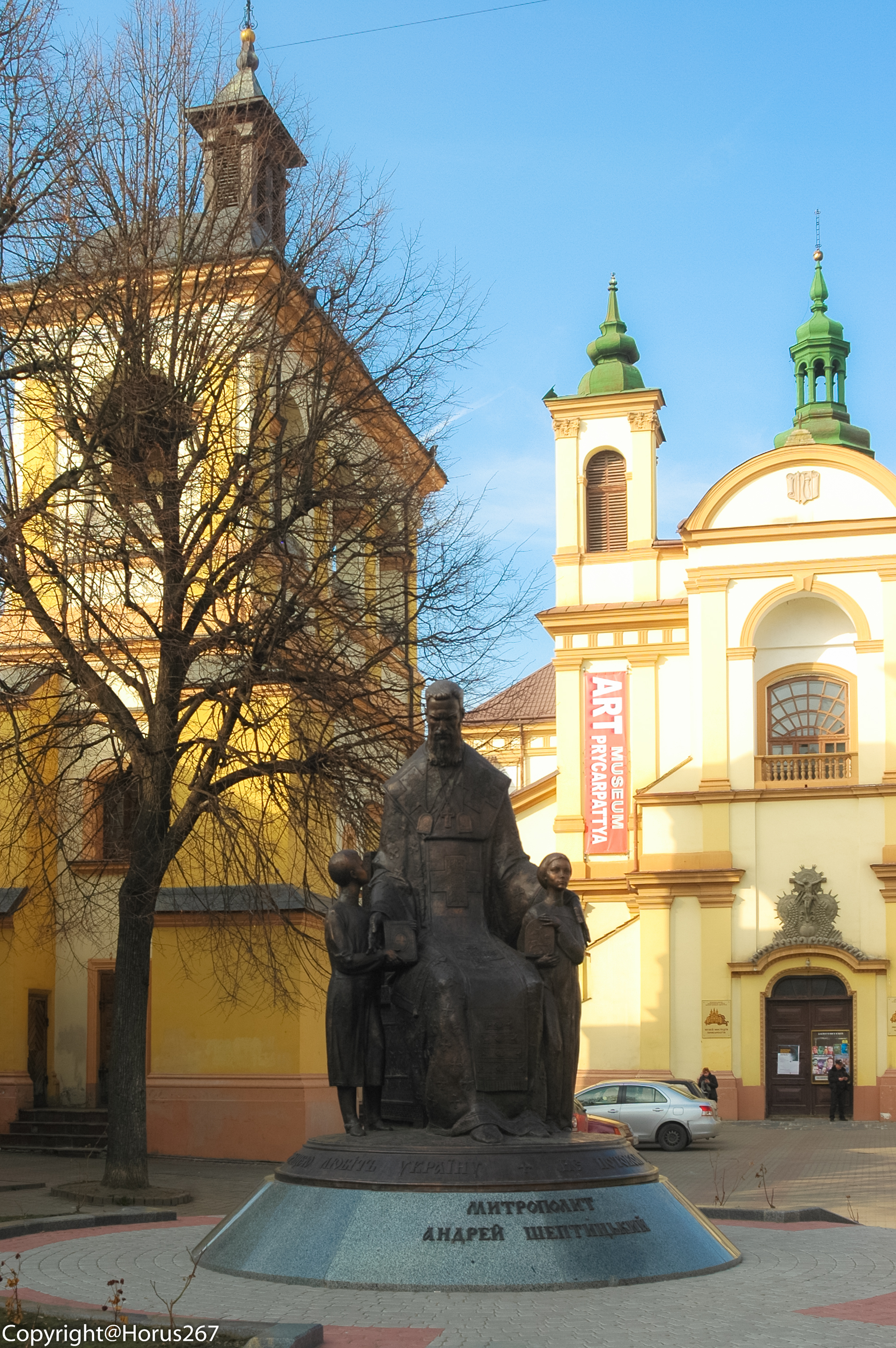
Monument to Sheptytsky in Ivano-Frankivsk

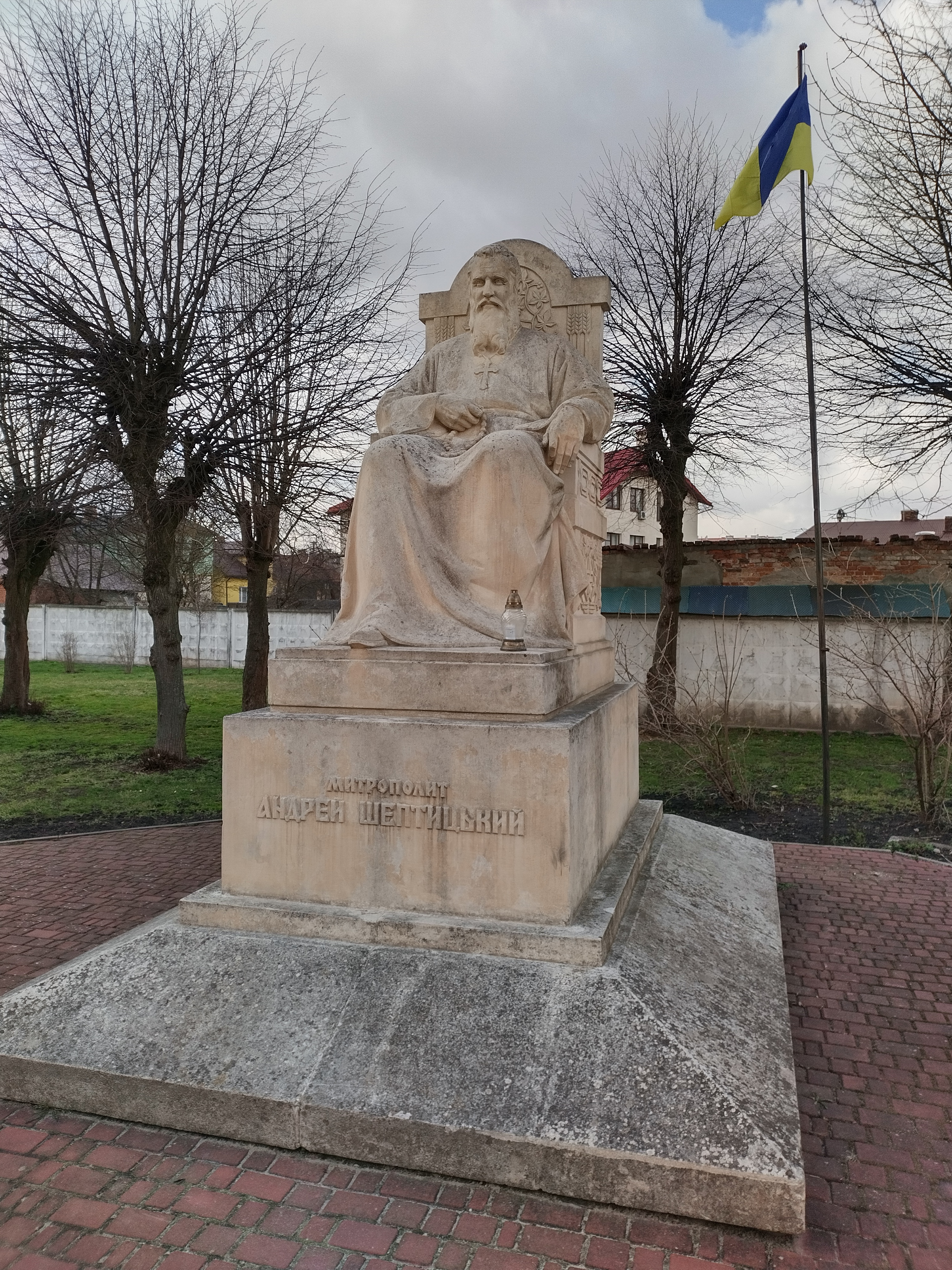
Monument to Sheptytsky in Yavoriv

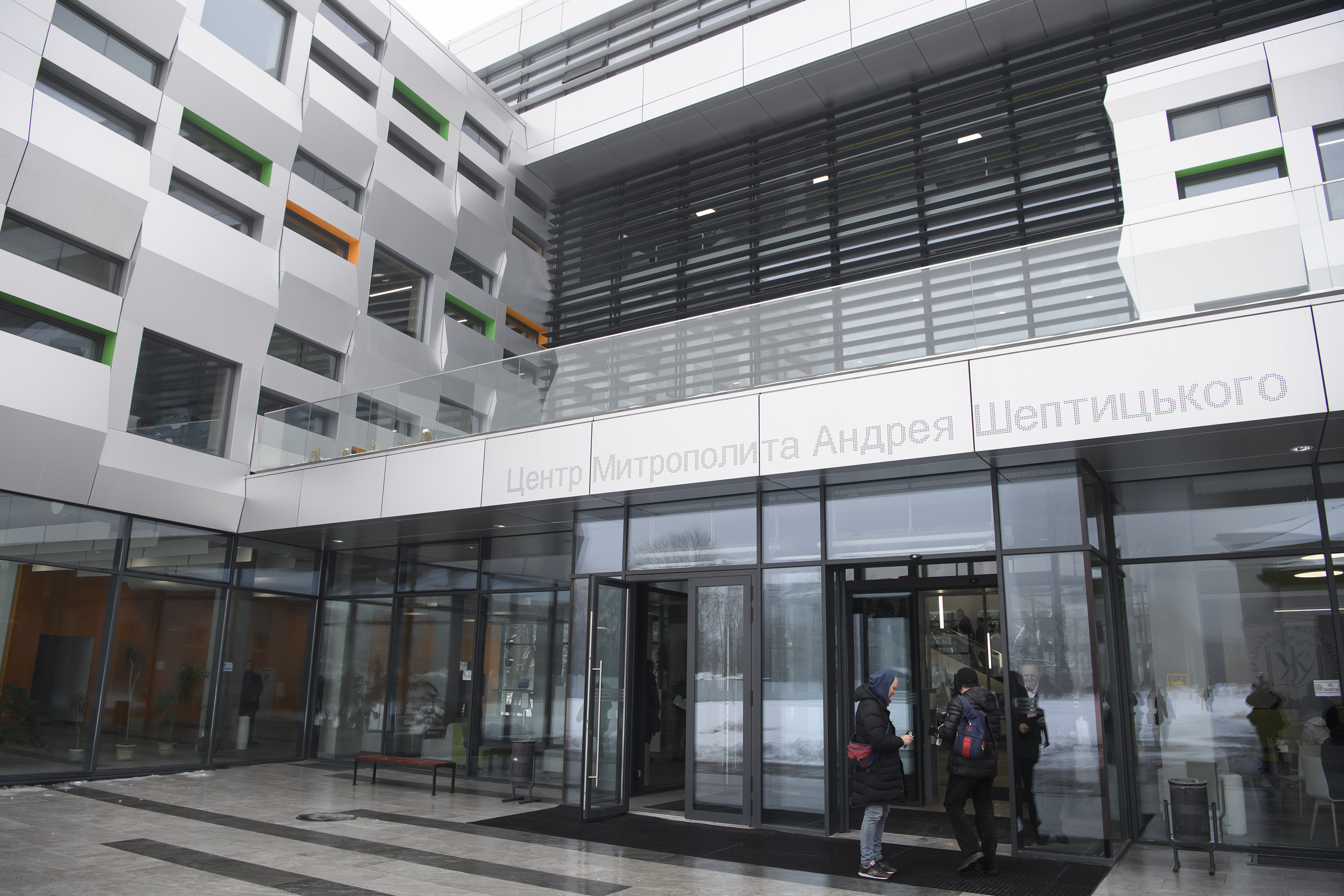
Sheptytsky Centre of the Ukrainian Catholic University

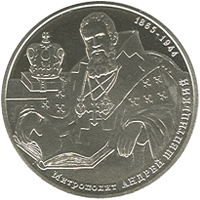
Memorial coin of Ukraine featuring Sheptytsky

== See also ==
- Yustyn Boiko
- Russian Catholic Apostolic Exarchate of Russia

== Literature ==
- Katchanovski, Ivan; Kohut, Zenon E.; Nebesio, Bohdan Y.; Yurkevich, Myroslav, eds. (2013). Historical Dictionary of Ukraine. The Scarecrow Press. ISBN 978-0-8108-7847-1.
- Magocsi, Paul Robert, ed. (1989). Morality and Reality: The Life and Times of Andrei Sheptyts'kyi. Canadian Institute of Ukrainian Studies. ISBN 0-920862-68-3.
- Mykhaleyko, Andriy (2024). "The "Invention" of Eastern Catholic Tradition". In Summerson, Andrew J.; Kennedy, Cyril (eds.). Eastern Catholic Theology In Action: Essays in Liturgy, Ecclesiology, and Ecumenism. The Catholic University of America Press. ISBN 978-0-8132-3900-2.
- Yurkevich, Myroslav (1986). "Galician Ukrainians in German Military Formations and in the German Administration". In Yury Boshyk (ed.). Ukraine During World War II: History and Its Aftermath. Canadian Institute of Ukrainian Studies, University of Alberta. ISBN 978-0-920862-36-0.

== Films ==
- Yad Vashem Interviews a Jew Whom Sheptytsky Rescued During the Holocaust on YouTube
- Recording of a Sermon by Metropolitan Sheptytsky on YouTube
- Saved by Sheptytsky – a documentary about some of 150 Holocaust survivors saved by Sheptytsky as kids on YouTube

Religious titles
Preceded by Julian Sas-Kuilovsky	Metropolitans of Galicia and Archbishop of Lemberg (as locum tenens in 1900); 1901–1944	Succeeded by Josyf Slipyj as Locum tenens until 1963
Preceded by Julian Sas-Kuilovsky	Bishop of Stanislau; 1899–1900	Succeeded by Hryhoriy Khomyshyn
