= Prylbychi =

Rural locality in Lviv Oblast, Ukraine

Prylbychi Прилбичі Przyłbice
- Village
- Location of Prylbychi in Lviv Oblast Location of Prylbychi in Ukraine
- Coordinates: 49°53′03″N 23°27′57″E
- Country: Ukraine
- Oblast: Lviv Oblast
- Raion: Yavoriv Raion
- Area: 621 km^{2} (240 sq mi)
- Elevation: 264 m (866 ft)
- Population: 2,363
  - Density: 38,052/km^{2} (98,550/sq mi)
- Website: село Прилбичі _{(Ukrainian)}

Prylbychi (Ukrainian: При́лбичі, Polish: Przyłbice) is a village (selo) in Yavoriv Raion, Lviv Oblast, in southwest Ukraine. It belongs to Novoiavorivsk urban hromada, one of the hromadas of Ukraine. The village is at a distance of 47 kilometres (29 mi) from the city of Lviv and 13 kilometres (8.1 mi) from the city of Yavoriv. Its population is 1,529. Local government — Prylbychivska village council.

== History ==
Archaeological evidence suggests that surrounding terrain was inhabited already in the Stone Age. Pottery fragments of ancient period are found in many places of villages. The first written mention of the settlement dates back to 1371. More recent written references date back to 1437, 1453 and 1469 years.

The village undergone attacks of conquerors many times. Throughout the ages changed owners. In the end, the lands became the property of Sheptytsky family. Modest Humetsky family has sold manor Prylbychi on the Athanasius Sheptytskyi, Greek Catholic bishop of Przemyśl (1750-1779) in the 18th century. Thus the village became for the Sheptytsky families marital nest until 1939.

In the village of Prylbychi was born Roman Aleksander Maria Sheptytsky (July 29, 1865 – November 1, 1944). He was the Metropolitan Archbishop of the Ukrainian Greek Catholic Church from 1901 until his death in 1944.

== Culture ==
The village Prylbychi has the architectural monument Yavoriv Raion - Church of the Holy Virgin (wooden), 1741.

However, parishioners of the village Prylbychi within one night disassembled the old wooden church (architectural sight Yavoriv district) and on this place was built a new church.

In the village was built the tomb of the Sheptytsky families (was built in the village in 1937). Now a memorial stone is in a village on the Sheptytsky estate. Also, the new church and museum was built on behalf of Andrey Sheptytsky.

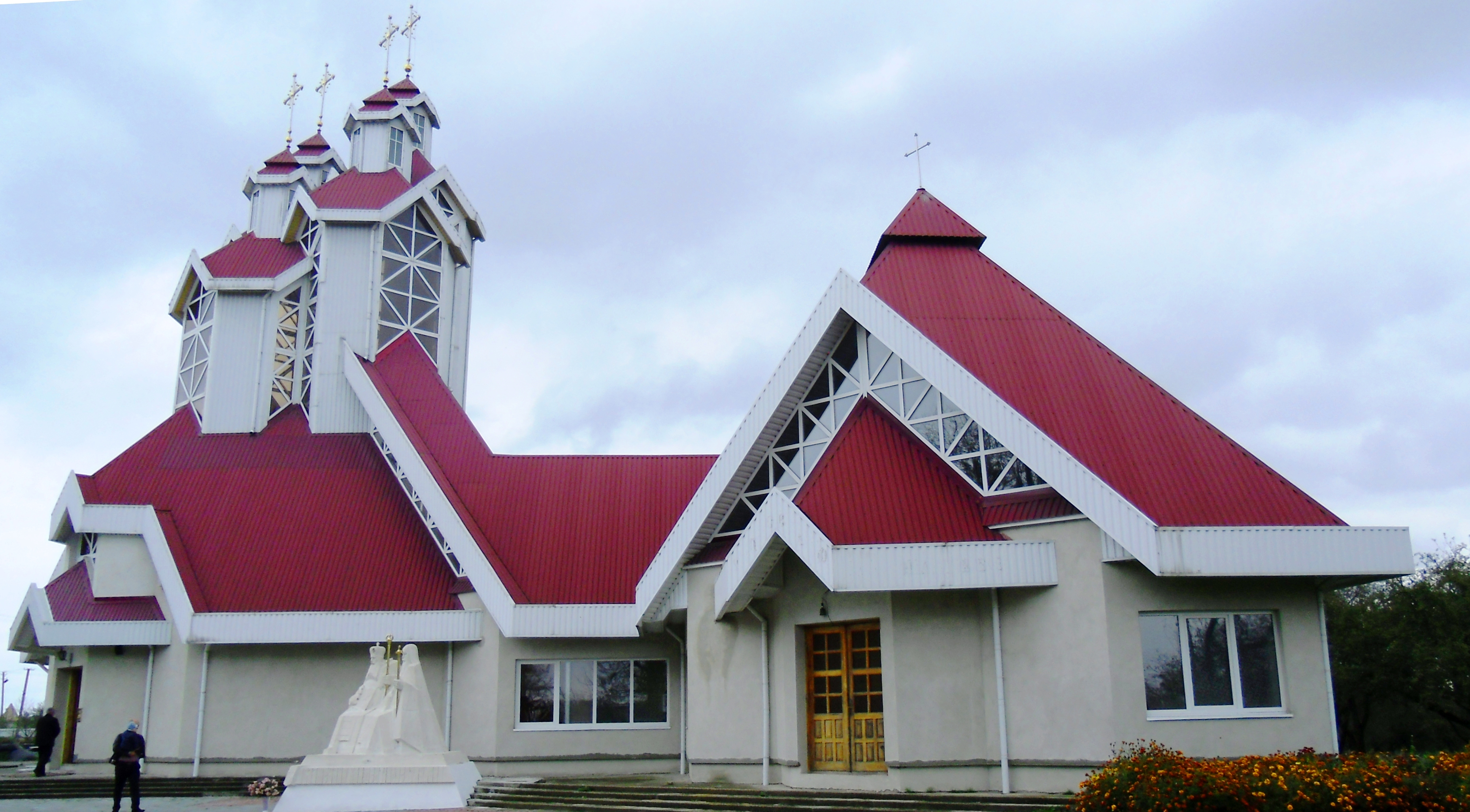
The Church and the Museum of name Metropolitan Andrey Sheptytsky

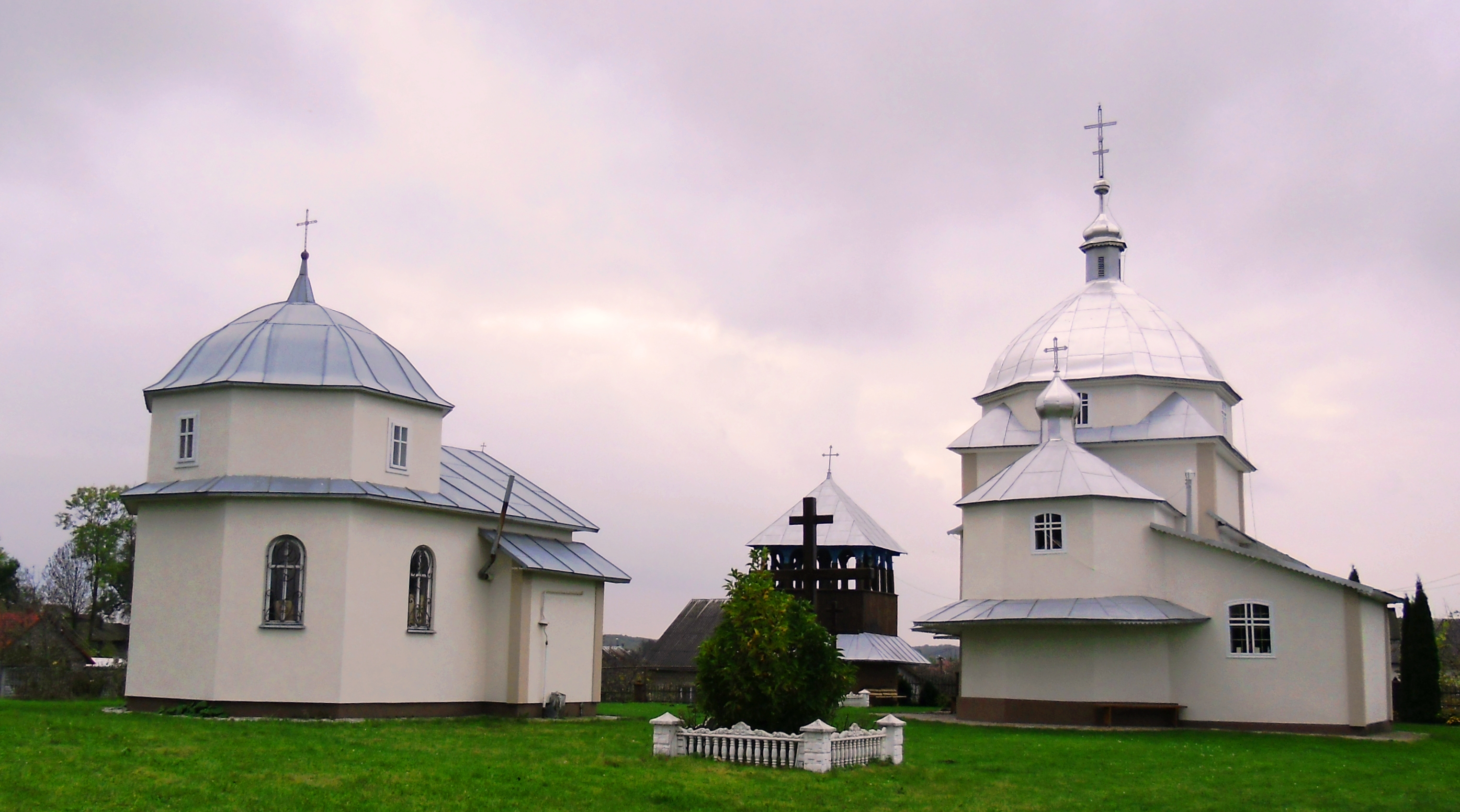
The newly rebuilt church in the village Prylbychi

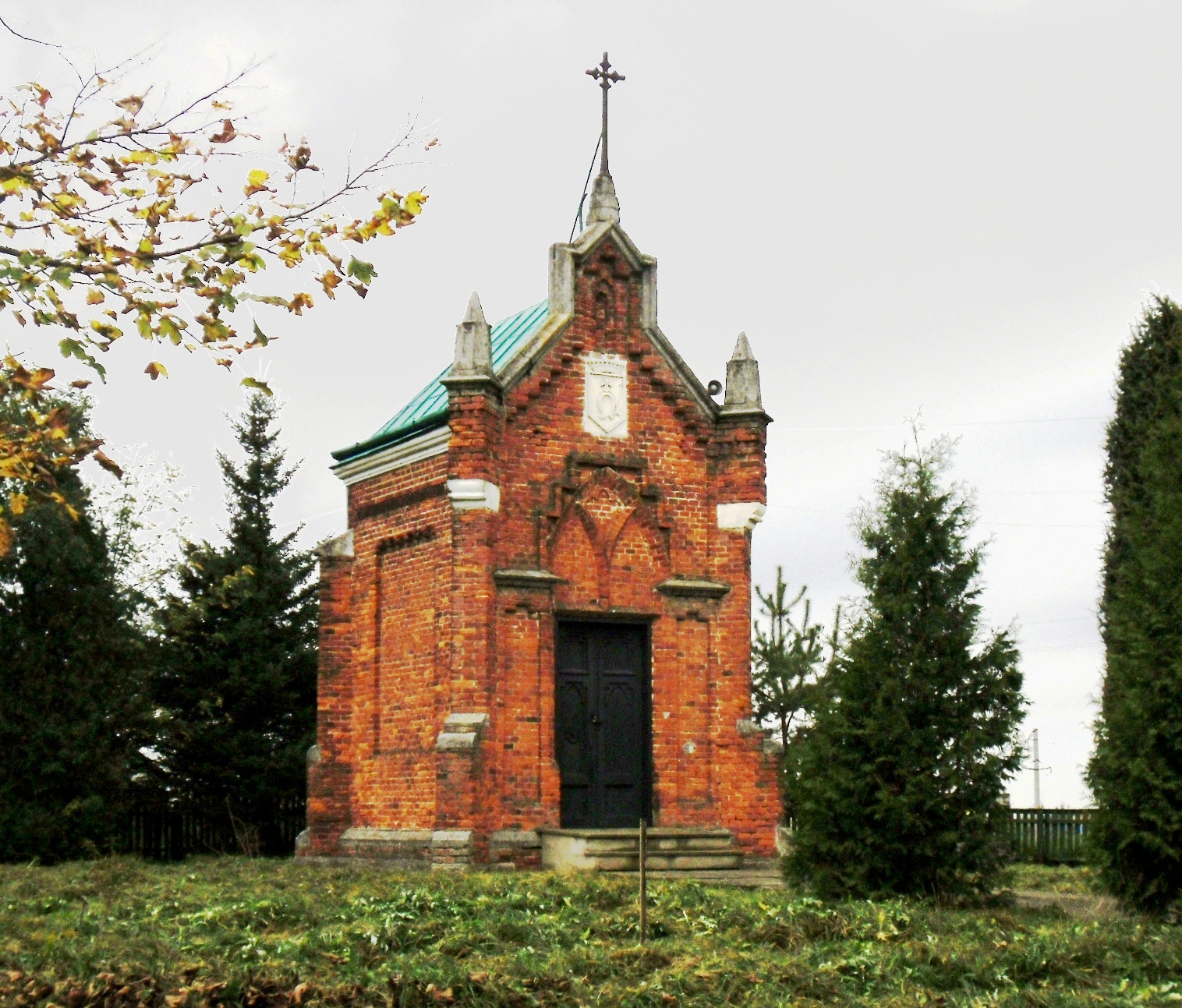
Sheptytsky family tomb in the village Prylbychi (1937)

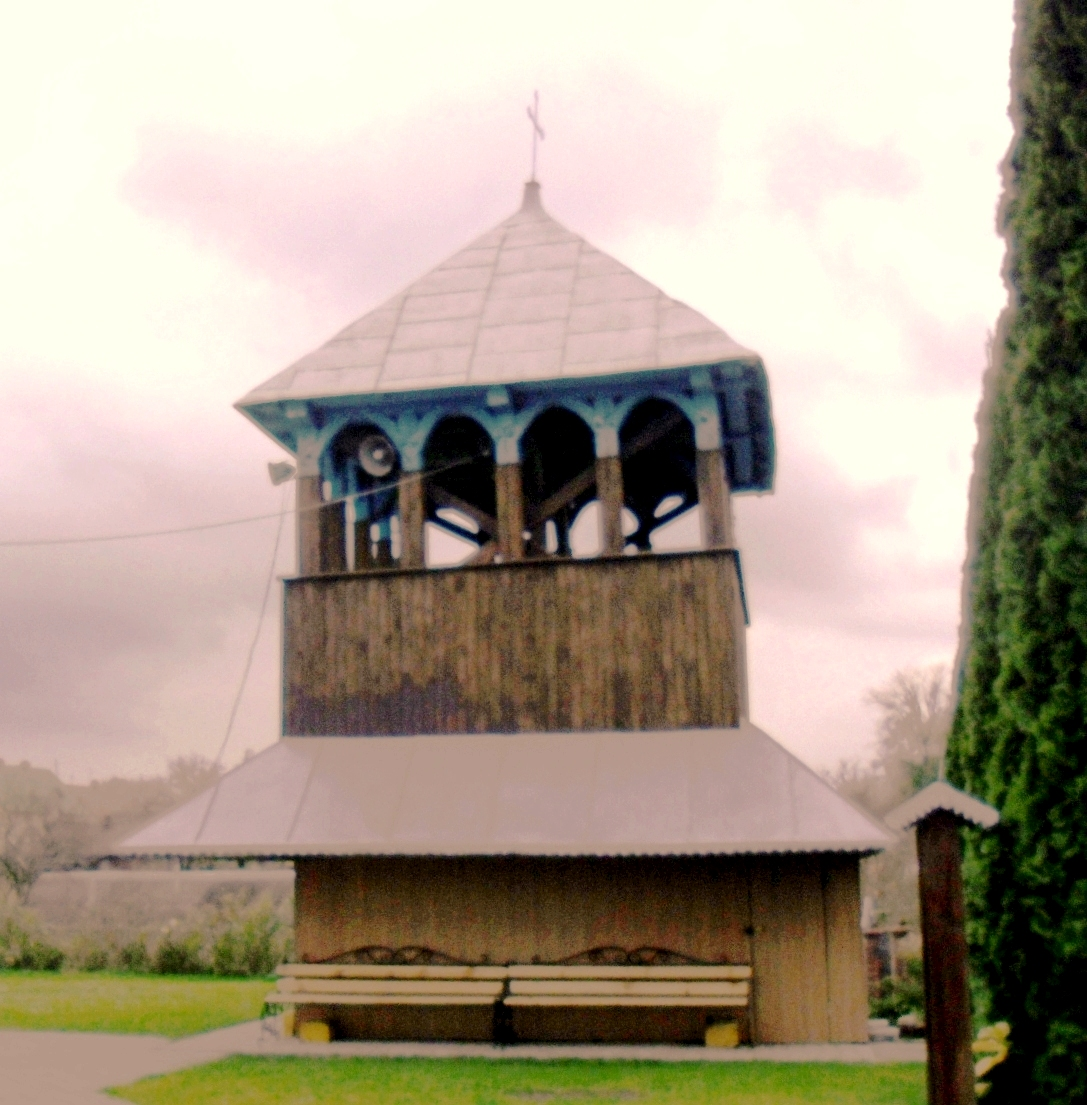
The bell tower at the Greek Catholic Church of the Blessed Virgin Mary

== Personalities ==
- Andrey Sheptytsky. Was born July 29, 1865, in the village Prylbychi, was the Metropolitan Archbishop of the Ukrainian Greek Catholic Church from 1901 until his death in 1944. During the Nazi occupation of Lviv city He protested to leading Nazis about the Holocaust, instructed his flock that to murder Jews was a great sin, and personally saved the lives of many dozens of Jews. He wrote a letter to Himmler asking him to stop using Ukrainian policemen to murder Jews.
- There were born his brothers Klymentiy Sheptytsky and Stanisław Szeptycki.
- Zofia Sheptycka - mother on all brothers Sheptytsky.

== Fishing ==
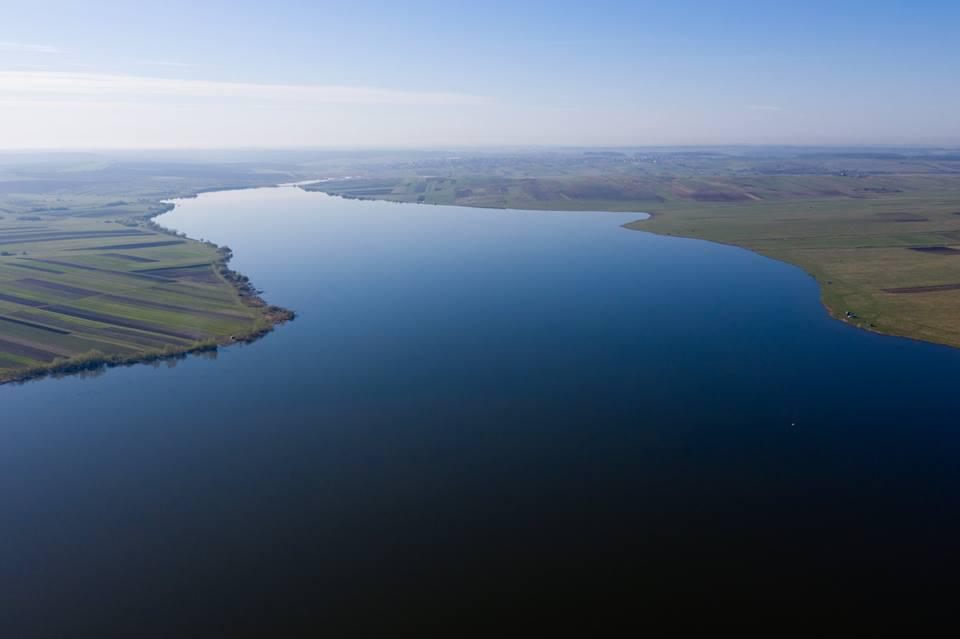
View on the reservoir near Prylbichi from the sky

Along with the village on the Gnoyonets River was created a reservoir for some needs of the chemical industry in the second half of the twentieth century. Since 2008, the reservoir has been taken for a long-term lease by the Lviv Carp Club.

This is the largest sport water reservoir in Ukraine that well known as "Prylbichi lake". It contains 90 pegs for fishing. Here will be the World Championship of Carp Fishing in 2020.

General information about this pond:

- Area - 120 hectares
- Length of the coastline - more than 6 km
- Width - up to 1 km
- Length - 2.6 km
- Depth - up to 4.5 m
- Fish: carp, crucian carp, roach, perch, grass carp, pike, perch.

The most important principle of fishing here is: "catch and release ". It is strictly forbidden to take fish.

The main object of angling here is carp. The average weight of this fish is about 6 kilograms, the largest catches of fish reach the weight of 18 kilograms. The largest resident by 2019 is a carp with its own name, Mykyta has a weight of 24 kilograms (it varies slightly depending on the season). Official carp lake website - Trident Lake
