= Ukrainian Greek Catholic Church in the Soviet Union =

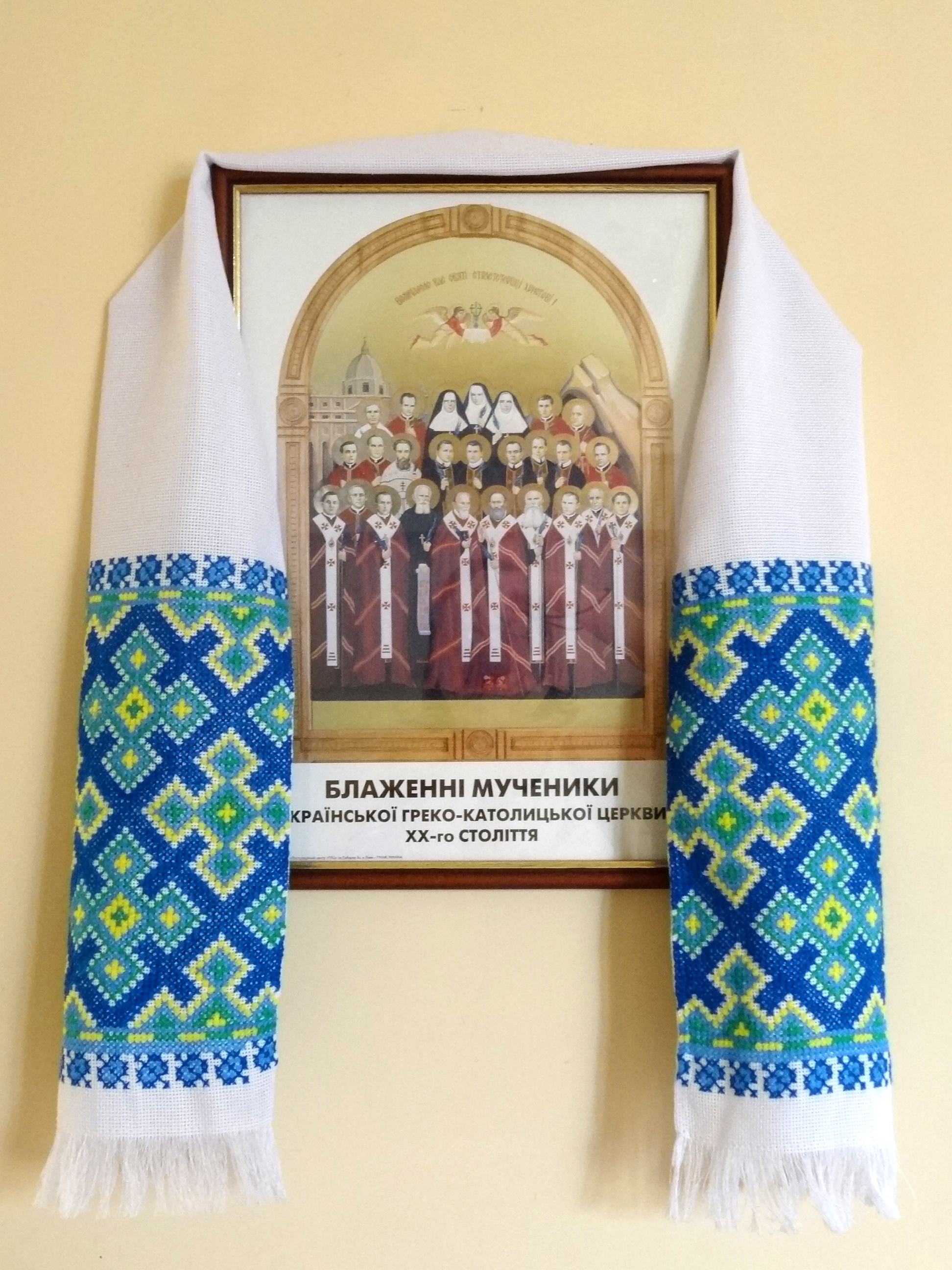
20th century martyrs of the Ukrainian Greek Catholic Church pictured in a church in Vinnytsia - fot. Ivonna Nowicka

The Ukrainian Greek Catholic Church in the USSR refers to the period in its history between 1939 and 1991, when Ukraine was part of the Soviet Union.

== Tensions in the pre-Soviet period ==
Soviet policy toward the Ukrainian Greek Catholic Church cannot be understood simply in terms of Marxist–Leninist ideology. The precedent for Stalinist church policy in Western Ukraine can be found in the treatment of the Greek-Catholic Church during centuries of tsarist rule and the pattern of relations between the Russian state and the Orthodox Church.

Hostility toward the so-called "Uniate Church" dates back to the Union of Brest in 1596, when the majority of Orthodox bishops in Ukraine and Belarus (then part of the Polish–Lithuanian Commonwealth) recognized the primacy of the Holy See. In return, papal guarantees recognized that the Uniates retained their Byzantine (Eastern) rite, the Church-Slavonic liturgical language, Eastern canon law, a married clergy and administrative autonomy.

Coming only seven years after the establishment of the Moscow Patriarchate (which claimed jurisdiction over the Orthodox in the Commonwealth), this union was viewed by Muscovy not only as an ecclesiastical obstacle to its claim as the "Third Rome," but also as an attempt to permanently separate Ukraine and Belarus from Muscovy.

This opposition continued after the second and third partitions of Poland at the end of the 18th century, when the Russian Empire systematically carried out attempts to liquidate the Union of Brest that was realized in the Synod of Polotsk in 1839 when all the Greek-Catholic Bishops in Russia joined the Russian Orthodox Church but the Ukrainian Greek Catholic Church (then "Ruthenian Uniate Church") continued in the Kingdom of Galicia and Lodomeria (a crownland in the Austrian Empire of the House of Habsburg-Lorraine).

The Ukrainian Greek-Catholic Church's incompatibility with Soviet Russian policy and social order stems from the church's title. As a "Ukrainian" church, the UGCC not only managed to maintain its ethnic individuality under foreign domination but also helped forge a modern national self-identity. As a "Catholic" church, the UGCC was closely tied to Rome and to other Catholic Churches.

== Attempts to liquidate the church in 1939-41 ==
Without any efforts to conceal its intentions, the Soviet regime renewed earlier attempts to liquidate the Union of Brest following its occupation of Western Ukrainian lands in September 1939, prior to which they were occupied by Poland.

A propaganda campaign against the Ukrainian Greek-Catholic Church was initiated by the magazine "Communist", which, in its 9 October 1939 issue, accused the church's infrastructure of Anti-Soviet agitation and collaboration with the "Polish Bourgeoisie." At this same time, 20 Ukrainian Greek-Catholic publications were shut down by Soviet authorities who subsequently began confiscating religious literature from libraries and bookstores. Seminaries and monastic novitiates also witnessed the forced closure of their institutions. On 22 October 1939, the Peoples' Committees of Ukraine voted on and passed a decree calling for the nationalization of all Greek-Catholic property, including churches and monasteries. The day-to-day operations of all Greek-Catholic organizations were prohibited. Priests were deemed "unfit for society" and levied with exorbitant taxes, amounting up to 15,000 roubles per year. Metropolitan Andrey Sheptytsky personally met with Nikita Khrushchev regarding the tax burdens, and managed to secure a slight mitigation.

On 9 October 9, 1939, Sheptytsky issued a pastoral letter in which he underscored the difficulty of the new situation for the church and emphasized the necessity of rearing children and youth in the spirit of the Greek-Catholic faith. A few months later, the metropolitan addressed the priests of the UGCC, requesting that they refrain from openly endorsing any political power to avoid further repressions. But, unsatisfied with the rate at which atheism was being implemented, the regime increased its anti-religious campaign by supplementing the budgets of the media and such organizations as the Komsomol and Association of Military Non-Believers. Schools became targets of increased pressure to introduce curricula featuring subjects on atheism, while traditional religious holidays were officially declared work days.

The atheism campaign was augmented by the simultaneous attempt to introduce and embed the influence and authority of the Russian Orthodox Church on the territory of Galicia. On 17 October 1939, Panteleymon Rozhnovsky was appointed bishop of Grodno and authorized to conduct missionary work in Western Belarus and Ukraine. In the middle of the following year, Mykola Yarushevych became the exarch of Volhynia. On 28 October 1940, despite disapproval even from Orthodox hierarchs, who warned of possible difficulties stemming from planned religious conversions, the Moscow Patriarchate openly declared its desire to liquidate Greek-Catholicism.

The expansion of the Russian Orthodox Church and the process of implementing atheism throughout the Ukrainian territories were interrupted by the outbreak of the Nazi-Soviet War of 22 June 1941. From the summer of 1941 until the summer of 1944, Western Ukraine was under Nazi occupation.

== Renewed pressure on the UGCC in 1944-1945 ==
In the summer and fall of 1944, the Soviet Red Army re-occupied Eastern Galicia, as well as Transcarpathia, the seat of the Ukrainian Greek-Catholic Eparchy of Mukachiv-Uzhhorod. In time, Communist forces extended their rule on all neighboring territories settled by ethnic Ukrainians-Uniates, including the Riashiv, Lemko and Priashiv regions of present-day Poland and Slovakia. In his letter to Cardinal Tisserant (March 22nd, 1944), Sheptytsky expressed his deep concern over the return of Soviet occupying forces, in which he stated that, "The Bolshevik Army is approaching... This news fills all the faithful with fear. Everyone... is convinced they are destined for certain death."

At first, the Soviet regime did not openly concern itself with the question of implementing atheism in Western Ukraine. The authority of Church and Metropolitan Sheptysky forced the state to avoid a direct conflict. In fact, Sheptytsky, who died on 1 November 1944, was granted a solemn yet momentous funeral, the ceremony of which was attended by members of the new regime.

At the close of World War II, the Greek-Catholic Church in the Ukrainian S.S.R. consisted of 4 eparchies with 2,326 parishes, over 4,000 structures and approximately 3.5 – 4 million faithful. Pastoral duties were being fulfilled by 8 bishops and close 2,400 priests. The 4 eparchies administered theological academies, 4 seminaries with 565 seminarians, as well as 35 monasteries with 155 monks and 347 brotherhoods, and 123 convents with 979 nuns.

By April 1945, Iosyf Stalin approved a 10-point plan – developed by leaders of the Ukrainian Communist Party – which called for the liquidation of the Greek-Catholic Church and the augmentation of Orthodox infrastructures in Ukraine. The Soviet press began to slander the priesthood and unleashed a campaign attacking the Greek-Catholic Church's history. In addition, the press renewed its accusations of Nationalism vis-à-vis the Ukrainian Greek-Catholic Church and organizing anti-Soviet resistance. The pro-Soviet articles of the Galician journalist Yaroslav Halan, a correspondent for the daily newspaper Vil'na Ukraina (A Free Ukraine), were particularly effective in harming the church's reputation.

On 11 April 1945, the NKGB arrested Metropolitan Josyf Slipyj, Sheptytsky's successor, as well as 4 Galician bishops: Hryhory Khomyshyn, Ivan Liatyshevsky, Nikita Budka and Mykola Charnetsky. At a time when bishops and other members of the religious community who refused to "convert" to Orthodoxy were accused of fabricated political crimes and deported to concentration camps (where only Metropolitan Slipyj, and Bishops Charnetsky and Liatyshevsky, survived), the NKVD created a "voluntary" movement for the "reunion" (Rus. vossoiedyneniia) with the Russian Orthodox Church. This movement, in addition to the support of those priests who voluntarily strived for reunion, also relied on the official support of priests who were forced into such a position, often by torture. Almost immediately following the wave of arrests of the Ukrainian Greek-Catholic hierarchs, the Russian Orthodox Church appointed Mykhailo Oksiiuk bishop of Lviv and Ternopil, expressly advising him to coordinate his actions with the "people's movement for the union of the Church."

== "The Initiative Group" ==
The so-called "Initiative Group for the Reunion of the Greek-Catholic Church with the Orthodox Church" was created on 28 May 1945, with the Rev. Havryil Kostelnyk at its helm. Two official letters were written on this day. The first letter was addressed to the government of Soviet Ukraine, requesting the Initiative Group's formal recognition as well as its authorization for the right to carry out the "reunion" campaign. The second letter informed the Ukrainian Greek-Catholic clergy that the group was created "by the will of the people" and that the group did not recognize any other administrative leadership of the Ukrainian Greek-Catholic Church. On 18 June 1945, Pavlo Khodchenko, the republican plenipotentiary of the Council for the Affairs of the Russian Orthodox Church, replied on behalf of the government of the Ukrainian S.S.R., recognizing the "Initiative Group" as the sole provisional organ of church administration, authorized to conduct all affairs of the Greek-Catholic parishes situated on the territory of Western Ukraine. This paved the way for proceeding in all matters concerning the reunion with the Russian Orthodox Church.

The Initiative Group was authorized to "coordinate and comply with the government on all legal affairs pertaining to the administration of Greek-Catholic parishes." The reply also instructed the Initiative Group to dispatch to Khodchenko "lists of all deans, parish priests and hegumens [superiors] of monasteries who refused to recognize the jurisdiction of the Initiative Group." Khodchenko's letter is the only officially publicized document confirming the government's direct participation in the process of destroying the Uniate Church.

A group of Ukrainian Greek-Catholic hierarchs who were not yet incarcerated – under the leadership of Archimandrite Klymentiy Sheptytsky – issued a formal protest against Khodchenko's directives. In their letter to Vyacheslav Molotov, they referred to specific clauses in Soviet law which guaranteed the freedom of religion and conscience. In addition, the letter of protest denoted the manipulative nature of the "Initiative Group" in its attempt to falsify the history of the Ukrainian Greek-Catholic Church. They demanded the release of Metropolitan Slipyj and other imprisoned clergy, while at the same time offering their assurance that Greek-Catholics have no intention to engage in anti-Soviet activity. However, none of these acts of protest were able to garner any positive results. In fact, the NKGB proceeded to arrest priests, particularly focusing its attention on members of the Order of St. Basil the Great. By the end of June 1945, the number of those incarcerated exceeded 200.

The "Initiative Group" also began to engage in the so-called "political re-education" of Ukrainian Greek-Catholics. In August 1945, it distributed 5,000 copies of Kostelnyk's anti-papal brochure which condemned the Union of Brest and appealed for the conversion to Orthodoxy. During his many private meetings with members of the priesthood, Kostelnyk asserted that the issue of "reunion" would be limited only to a formal subordination to the Russian Orthodox Church; the ability to observe holy days and conduct religious services would be retained without any changes and such an arrangement, given the circumstances, would be in the best interest of the faithful. At the same time, representatives of the "Initiative Group" were systematically informing the government of recalcitrant priests. As a result, those priests who refused to sign the document certifying their conversion to Orthodoxy, were not only automatically relieved of their pastoral responsibilities, but often arrested as well. The "Initiative Group" considered the combination of various forms of pressure, to be effective – in October 1945 Kostelnyk estimated that by year's end only a hundred priests would be negatively inclined towards "reunification." Yet, he admitted that among those individuals who agreed to the conversion, there were many who committed this act out of fear or the desire to continue their pastoral activity under the pretext of subordinating to the regime.

The activities of the "Initiative Group" were personally supervised by the then head of the Communist Party of Ukraine (CPU), Nikita Khrushchev, who informed Stalin on 17 December 1945 of the activities taken by the group under the supervision of the NKGB.

== The Synod of Lviv and its consequences ==
The culmination of the "unification" campaign took place at the Synod of Lviv in March 1946, when an assembly of appointed hierarchs "annulled" the Union of Brest (although this 1946 congregation was not convened in accordance with canon law). By 1949 the Russian Orthodox Church had forcibly absorbed the Ruthenian Greek Catholic Church as well, and an analogous "union" had also occurred on the territory of the Slovak Greek Catholic Church. In 1948, the Union of Brest was abolished in Romania and Orthodoxy was also instituted in ten Ukrainian Greek Catholic parishes in those regions neighboring Transcarpathia. The Greek Catholic Church was also de facto disbanded in Poland in 1947-1949.

The forced "unification" did not eradicate the existence of the Ukrainian Greek Catholic Church. The church survived within the formal infrastructure of the Orthodox Church as an "underground" Uniate Church, in the Gulags, in exile, and clandestinely on the territory of western Ukraine. However, the church received its formal legal right to exist only in 1989.

== The Ukrainian Greek-Catholic Church after Stalin's death ==
Stalin's death in March 1953, the internal struggle for power following his demise, and the so-called de-Stalinization campaign initiated by Nikita Khrushchev all had a significant impact on the Ukrainian Greek-Catholic Church. A few months following the dictator's death, Metropolitan Josyf Slipyj – whose 8-year sentence officially ended in April 1953 – by Beria's order, was transferred from a camp in Mordova to Moscow. As he sought out allies during his struggle for power in Ukraine and the other non-Russian republics, Beria began to oppose the russification of Western Ukraine. His subordinates began secret negotiations with Josyf Slipyj regarding the normalization of relations with the Vatican and the legalization of the Greek-Catholic Church in Western Ukraine. Discussions with the metropolitan were abruptly discontinued after Beria's arrest. Slipyj did not accept the KGB's proposal of renouncing his loyalty to the Pope of Rome in exchange for freedom and a high position in the Russian Orthodox Church. As a result, he was sentenced to exile in Krasnoyarsk where he remained under the obscure status of a semi-prisoner until his subsequent arrest in 1958. In 1955-1956 following Khrushchev's dissolution of the Gulag system, a few hundred Greek-Catholic priests and monks were released from the camps and permitted to return to Western Ukraine.

Among those released were two bishops: Nicholas Charnetsky who returned to Lviv, and Ivan Lyatyshevskyi, the auxiliary bishop of the Stanislaviv Eparchy, who returned to Stanislaviv. Although they were forbidden to engage in pastoral activities, both bishops continued to fulfill their episcopal obligations and ordained a number of priests. Due to the fact that many Ukrainian Greek-Catholic priests – now formally serving as Orthodox priests – appealed to the bishops by requesting absolution and their re-acceptance into the Greek-Catholic faith, in 1956 Bishop Charnetsky came to the conclusion that the priests should continue to provide pastoral care to the faithful in the Orthodox Church, while secretly belonging to the Greek-Catholic Church. Thus, the banned Greek-Catholic Church – without any possibility of legally serving its faithful – managed to formally maintain its presence in the Orthodox Church in the form of a "clandestine" Greek-Catholic clergy. Furthermore, the Greek-Catholic Church was able to supplement, to some degree, the ranks of its priesthood through the "underground" Greek-Catholic seminaries.

== New tensions regarding the status of and policies towards the UGCC ==
De-Stalinization, just like the transformation of the Greek-Catholic Church in Poland in 1956-1957, brought hope for yet another legalization of the Greek-Catholic Church in Western Ukraine. A large number of appeals regarding legalization were produced by the faithful, while a few parishes even rejected Orthodoxy. The publication in December 1957 of a resolution adopted in October of that year by the deans of the Lviv Eparchy during a conference held at the Pochaiv Monastery, quashed these aspirations. The resolution distinctly underscored the fact that the Soviet government's stance regarding the Ukrainian Greek-Catholic Church had not changed and that it [the church] will continue to be interpreted as an instrument in the hands of "enemies of the state."

Moreover, a clear signal of the regime's hard-line attitude towards the Greek-Catholic Church, was the arrest, in the spring of 1958, of exiled Metropolitan Josyf Slipyj under the premise of illegal contacts with members of the clergy and the smuggling abroad of the metropolitan's pastoral letters and other correspondence. Following lengthy hearings in June 1959, during a closed trial in Kyiv, the metropolitan was sentenced to an additional 7 years of imprisonment.

It was only as a result of ongoing discussions between Pope John XXIII, Nikita Khrushchev and President John F. Kennedy between 1961 and 1963, that the metropolitan was finally released from imprisonment in late January 1963. On 4 February 1963, after secretly appointing Vasyl Velychkovsky as bishop-exarch of Lviv, Slipyj departed Moscow en route to Rome. However, improved relations between the Vatican and Moscow did not benefit the status of the Greek-Catholic Church in Ukraine – repressions against active, underground Uniate bishops and clergy commenced once again.

The relative amelioration of Moscow-Vatican relations coincided with the final phase of Krushchev's "de-Stalinization" period, which nevertheless consisted of an ongoing Soviet anti-religious policy, the main target of which, since the late 1950s, was the Russian Orthodox Church. Prior to Khrushchev's ouster at the end of 1964, a large number of Orthodox churches, monasteries and seminaries were closed.

Seeking to establish amicable relations with the Kremlin, the Moscow Patriarchate renewed its function as a supporter and defender of Soviet foreign policy. In 1960, the Russian Orthodox Church joined the World Council of Churches and initiated contact with the Vatican. The illegal status of the Ukrainian Greek-Catholic Church in the USSR became the key point of contention between the Vatican and the Moscow Patriarchate. In this respect, Moscow's greatest wish was for the pope to renounce the Uniates. At a minimum, the task was to maintain the status quo and keep the Vatican from legalizing the Greek-Catholic Church worldwide.

The Moscow Patriarchate hoped that closer relations with the pope would neutralize the pressure induced by Uniate émigré circles upon the Vatican, as well as demoralize the underground church in Ukraine. In both cases, the Moscow Patriarchate achieved a certain amount of success during the papacy of Paul VI, which coincided with the leadership of Leonid Brezhnev.

== The Brezhnev Period ==
The Greek-Catholic clergy – undaunted by disciplinary sanctions in 1965-1966 – in mid-1966 began celebrating liturgies on Sundays and religious holidays in officially non-functioning churches in Western Ukraine. The clergy's actions served as a test to monitor the regime's potential reaction to such activity. Thus, by August 1967, close to 200 churches were once again meeting the spiritual needs of Ukrainian Catholics in Galicia, while a large number of those priests who had been "accepted" into the Orthodox Church, were secretly seeking the opportunity to return to the Greek-Catholic Church.

Countless appeals for the legal registration of Ukrainian Greek-Catholic parishes were rejected by the regime.

Despite the regime's warnings, the majority of the active clergy openly continued pastoral activity. The restored legal status of the Greek-Catholic Church in neighboring Czechoslovakia in June 1968 (which was not rescinded following the Soviet invasion in August of that year) and the subsequent return of the majority of the parishes, which had been transferred in 1950 to the government-supported Orthodox Church, galvanized the Uniates in Galicia and inclined Cardinal Josyf Slipyj, that same year, to relay a memorandum to the Presidium of the Supreme Soviet of Ukraine calling for the legalization of the Church. A meeting between the head of the Presidium of the Supreme Soviet of the USSR, Mykola Pidhornyi and Pope Paul VI on June 30, 1969, produced no breakthrough regarding the legalization of the Ukrainian Greek-Catholic Church.

However, just as in 1957, prospects for the UGCC's resurgence from the underground compelled the Russian Orthodox Church in 1968 to demand from the Soviet regime an assurance that this would never happen. In October 1968, a new wave of repressions was initiated against the Ukrainian Greek-Catholic Church. The arrest of Bishop Velychkovsky and two underground priests was the culmination of this last crackdown on the cusp of 1968-1969. Empty churches throughout the countryside which at one time had been frequented by Greek Catholics, were now being either destroyed by the local authorities or utilized for secular purposes; a number of churches were transformed into museums of atheism. In some locales the situation came to a head between the militia and faithful, including incidents of violence where the faithful were brutally beaten or temporarily detained by the militia. Priests who were caught celebrating liturgical services were issued monetary fines.

This renewed wave of repressions coincided with Moscow's crackdown on political demonstrations in Ukraine which manifested themselves in the form of Ukrainian dissidents' support for the renewal of the Greek-Catholic Church. The beginning of the 1970s was also characterized by a significant increase in defamatory and intimidating publications in the press.

These new attacks divided the Ukrainian Greek-Catholic clergy vis-à-vis the prospects for the legalization of their church. Many representatives of the clergy fell under the assumption that the regime would never recognize the Church and therefore a "compromise" – as was often proposed by KGB operatives during interrogations – would serve as a possible solution. Others, on the other hand, sought some kind of modus vivendi and hoped for some sort of Vatican-Moscow outcome which would benefit the status and further the recognition process of the Ukrainian Greek-Catholic Church.

Throughout 1972-1973, Ukrainian Catholics submitted to the [Soviet] government many declarations calling for the legalization of the Church. However, fear of repressions hindered the collecting of signatures. A petition relayed to Moscow in February 1973 via a delegation headed by Rev. Volodymyr Prokopiv garnered 1200 signatures. The initiative spearheaded by Rev. Prokopiv – who attempted to secure the Church's registration under the hope of a compromise – did not enjoy broad support amongst the clergy. Rev. Prokopiv's proposal appeared to be yet another attempt to implode the Church from within.

The Final Act of the Conference on Security and Cooperation in Europe in Helsinki in August 1975 served as an important step towards the implementation of international monitoring of Human Rights in the USSR, particularly the freedom of religion. For the underground Ukrainian Greek-Catholic Church – the largest banned religious organization in the Soviet Union – the Helsinki Accords initiated the practice of regularly held observational conferences. In addition, the engagement of foreign, independent monitoring organizations as well as unofficial Helsinki Groups in the USSR (the Ukrainian Helsinki Group was formed in November 1976), paved the way for the internationalization of the Ukrainian Greek-Catholic Church. Beginning with the Belgrade conference in late 1977, the issue of the violation of the Ukrainian Greek-Catholics' religious freedom was formally raised in the form of various presentations and documents issued by American, Canadian and Vatican delegations as well as by other Western powers.

In late spring 1978, yet another initiative was undertaken – most likely under the impetus of the Soviet Ukrainian government – to resolve the legalization issue of the UGCC in the form of a "Roman Catholic Church of the Eastern Rite." The initiative group drafted a statute of such a church and proposed that its head be a Roman Catholic bishop from Lithuania to be appointed by the Pope. In so doing, the clergy's activities would be limited to celebrating liturgies and performing other religious ceremonial functions. Finances and the administering of parochial affairs would be fulfilled by lay parish councils, as guaranteed by Soviet legislation under the category "religious beliefs."

On 5 June 1978, the draft statute was submitted to the Council for Religious Affairs in Moscow. The overall initiative, however, failed to receive further attention and development. Even if the authorities had chosen to provide a formal response, the uncertainty regarding the future course of the Vatican's "Ost-Politik" could have possibly decided the endeavour's ultimate fate. Following the death of Pope Paul VI on 6 August 1978, and the unexpected passing of the pontiff's immediate successor on 29 September of that year, John Paul II became pope on 16 October 1978.

== Pope John Paul II and tensions vis-à-vis the Ukrainian Greek Catholic Church ==
John Paul II's ascension to the Holy See ushered in the Vatican's policy of support for the Ukrainian Greek-Catholic Church. The Soviet authorities' concerns regarding the new pope's intentions were confirmed by the publication of a letter (dated 19 March 1979) addressed to Cardinal Josyf Slipyj regarding the Millennium of Ukraine's Christianity, scheduled to be commemorated in 1988. In his letter, John Paul II underscored the importance of preserving the Union of Brest, by expressing his respect for the Ukrainian Greek-Catholic episcopate, clergy, and faithful who bore witness to injustice and persecution in the name of Christ and professed their faith in God and their Church. Simultaneously directing his address at the Soviet government, the pope invoked the Universal Declaration of Human Rights by appealing to the authorities to allow each believer to profess his/her own faith and to participate in the communal life of the Church to which he/she belongs.

The pope's letter to Slipyj not only sent shock waves and anxiety throughout the Vatican's Secretariat for Promoting Christian Unity (headed at that time by Cardinal Johannes Willebrands), but also spurred a harsh reaction from Moscow. As a result, the Moscow Patriarchate immediately postponed a scheduled theological meeting with Roman Catholic hierarchs in Odesa. In addition, on 4 September 1979, the patriarchate's representative in charge of external ecclesiastical affairs, Metropolitan Yuvenaliy, wrote a letter to Cardinal Willebrands in which he threatened the latter with "public criticism," if Willebrands did not immediately explain the "exact meaning" behind the papal missive to Slipyj.

Unsatisfied with Willebrands's diplomatic response, Moscow once again expressed outrage when in March 1980 John Paul II convened an extraordinary synod of all the Ukrainian bishops. It was during this synod that the pope confirmed the selection of Archbishop Myroslav Ivan Lubachivsky as coadjutor – with the right of succession – to Archbishop of Lviv, Josyf Slipyj, thereby guaranteeing the continuity of the Ukrainian Greek-Catholic Metropolitanate's leadership in Galicia. The already strained relations between Moscow and the Vatican were exacerbated even further, when later that same year the synod of Ukrainian bishops was once again summoned to Rome where, on 2 December 1980, it adopted a resolution which unanimously declared the Lviv Sobor of 1946 as uncanonical and void.

The Russian patriarch's protest initiated a broad discussion within the Roman curia regarding the priorities of Vatican-Moscow political and ecumenical relations, and the effect of Moscow's dissatisfaction with the Roman Catholic Church's position in the Soviet bloc. The pope's response to Moscow was issued on 24 January 1981, and was considered a compromise, which could satisfy neither the Russian Patriarchate nor the Ukrainian Greek-Catholics: the Apostolic See – by expressing its unwavering position in support of the rights of the Ukrainian Greek-Catholic Church – nevertheless wanted the resolution (of the 1946 Sobor) to initially be disseminated throughout the press and for the documents to be accessible for review. As a result, Rome immediately informed all of the papal nuncios in those countries where Ukrainian Catholics dwelled that the texts of the resolution did not receive formal approval and were therefore not considered official documents.

In the spring of 1980, the Soviet press left no doubt that John Paul II was perceived as a serious threat. As a result, an anti-papal and anti-Uniate campaign was initiated, which in Ukraine was spearheaded by Leonid Kravchuk. He informed a conference of Orthodox bishops that authorities in Ukraine had embarked on a massive propaganda initiative and had taken certain administrative steps to counteract the "nationalist and religious subversive deeds" supported by the Vatican.

== The Period of Transition ==
The final years of the Brezhnev regime and the transitional rule of Yuri Andropov and Kostyantin Chernenko were characterized in terms of an increase in political control. This included attacks against any manifestation of ideological deviation as well as an escalation of propaganda against such influences from abroad as: nationalism, Catholicism, religious fundamentalism, Zionism and American imperialism. At a time when a "patriotic" rapprochement between the Kremlin and the Russian Orthodox Church was becoming more and more evident, the banned Ukrainian Greek-Catholic Church was subjected to yet another wave of repressions. During the first half of 1980, three Uniate priests were murdered, while in early 1981 three additional priests were imprisoned. At this same time, Soviet Secret Service officials began using new, advanced methods of infiltration and internal manipulation with the intent of destabilizing the underground Church and undermining its status abroad.

During the early 1980s, several priests and proactive lay youth groups outside Ukraine distributed information worldwide about the dramatic situation of the Uniates and their struggle for the legalization of their Church. Domestically, in September 1982, under the leadership of Iosyp Terelia, "The Initiative Group for the Defence of the Rights of Believers and the Church" was organized. Following Terelia's arrest and sentencing to a one-year term of incarceration in December 1982, the group's leadership was assumed by another lay activist, Vasyl Kobryn, who in turn was arrested and sentenced to a three-year term of hard labour in November 1984. Beginning in 1984, on an irregular basis, the group began issuing a bulletin titled "The Chronicle of the Catholic Church in Ukraine," edited for the most part by Terelia.

One of the reasons behind the publication of the bulletin was the ever-deepening crisis because aging priests who were trained under "normal" circumstances (prior to the Church's destruction) could not be replaced by equally well-trained young clergymen. Another factor to contend with was the phenomenon of so-called "crypto-Catholics" who had evolved and increased in size over the course of the previous four decades by attending Orthodox services. Among them now functioned a new generation of Orthodox priests who had not undergone formation in the Uniate tradition and were thus increasingly distancing themselves from the Ukrainian Greek-Catholic Church. Given such circumstances, the concern was that this new generation of clergymen might not return to their original Church as long as it remained underground and was not officially recognized by the regime.

Cardinal Josyf Slipyj died on 7 September 1984 in Rome. He was succeeded, as planned, by Archbishop Myroslav Lubachivsky, whom Pope John Paul II appointed cardinal on 25 May 1985.

== The status of the UGCC at the outset of the Gorbachev era ==
Mikhail Gorbachev's ascension to the leadership of the Communist Party and the introduction of "Perestroika" paved the way for a number of political concessions. In 1986-1987 almost all Ukrainian prisoners of conscience were released. Their freedom became the basis for a revitalized movement in support of human, national and religious rights in Ukraine.

As the fear of massive political repressions began to wane, the underground Church was becoming more assertive and visible. In the wake of Gorbachev's reforms, "The Initiative Group for the Defense of the Rights of Believers and the Church" renewed its activities. In late 1987 – following Iosyp Terelia's relocation to Canada – the Initiative Group's title was changed to the "Committee for the Defense of the Ukrainian Catholic Church" and its leadership was now assumed by the recently released political dissident Ivan Gel.

The Committee began to publish an uncensored journal titled "The Christian Voice," which replaced "The Chronicle." With the arrival of "Glasnost," Ukrainian Catholic activists organized a campaign for the return of the Church's pre-war status. As a result, the clergy began to celebrate liturgies in public for large congregations of Greek-Catholics, particularly at pilgrimage sites. In addition, activists began organizing petitions demanding the reopening of Greek-Catholic churches as well as the full rehabilitation and legalization of the Church. Furthermore, the faithful were being encouraged to publicly confront the authorities on the issue of the constitutional rights of Ukrainian Catholics' religious freedom. Through the intervention of non-Ukrainian dissident movements in the Soviet Union, the Committee also began to distribute to the Western media not only various printed as well as audio-visual materials attesting to the massive support for the renewal of the Ukrainian Greek-Catholic Church, but also evidence of the ongoing repressions by Soviet authorities.

In early August 1987, a group consisting of Ukrainian Greek-Catholic priests, monks and lay people, including bishops Pavlo Vasylyk and Ivan Semedi, announced that it is "leaving the underground," and called upon the pope to "support the legalization of the Ukrainian Greek-Catholic Church in the USSR in every possible way." Soon afterwards, additional Ukrainian Catholic bishops, namely Metropolitan Volodymyr Sterniuk of Lviv and bishop Sofron Dmyterko of Ivano-Frankivsk, joined the group of activists demanding legalization. Pope John Paul II was now, on many an occasion, taking up the plight of Ukrainian Catholics in the USSR, and high expectations were being held in regards to the upcoming commemoration of the Millennium of Ukrainian Christianity.

The Pope celebrated the Millennium together with the hierarchs of the Ukrainian Greek-Catholic Church in Rome in 1988, subject to the condition that he could make a pastoral visit to a Ukrainian Greek-Catholic church, to serve as a symbolic gesture of gratitude to the pontiff for approving a high-ranking delegation's participation in Millennium festivities in Moscow and Kyiv. This led to a planned meeting in Moscow scheduled for 10 June 1988 between cardinals Agostino Casaroli and Johannes Willebrands and a Ukrainian Greek-Catholic Church delegation headed by bishops Fylymon Kurchaba and Pavlo Vasylyk.

On 17 September 1988, bishop Pavlo Vasylyk was invited to Moscow to take part in a roundtable discussion regarding the UGCC's situation in the Soviet Union. Additional discussants at the meeting also included four US senators and members of the USSR's Supreme Soviet (Parliament).

Nevertheless, Soviet authorities in Moscow and Ukraine, who consistently denied the UGCC's existence, rejected the latest initiatives for the Church's legalization. The Soviet press secretary argued that legalization is an internal matter of the Russian Orthodox Church, which itself is against any changes to the status quo in Western Ukraine. Furthermore, the authorities declared that the Ukrainian Greek-Catholic Church is not a religious organization but rather a "strictly political," "nationalist," and "separatist" entity and therefore does not qualify for registration as a religious denomination. In addition, the Uniate Church continued to be viewed as a supporter of nationalist leaders in Ukraine and abroad.

The Russian Orthodox Church – whose official status began to improve considerably starting in 1987 – was now beginning to voice its protest, both domestically and abroad, against the possible repeal of the Stalinist-era prohibition officially forbidding activities of the Ukrainian Greek-Catholic Church. In addition, Russian church hierarchs were displeased with the ever-increasing threat by the Uniate eparchies and parishes in Galicia and Transcarpathia to leave the Moscow Patriarchate to which they had been forcibly annexed.

In the summer of 1988, the authorities initiated new repressive measures regarding "unsanctioned" public gatherings and demonstrations. Such actions, taken against the Ukrainian Greek-Catholic clergy and lay people, included substantial monetary fines and administrative penalties in the form short-term arrests. At the end of 1988, Soviet authorities reacted to the now continuous efforts for the legalization of the Ukrainian Greek-Catholic Church by transferring more than 700 soon-to-be-reopened provincial Uniate churches to hastily organized Orthodox so-called "Twentiers" (Ukr. dvadtsiatky) primarily in locations where Greek-Catholics constituted a majority. According to a Soviet ordinance of that time, 20 religious faithful constituted a sufficient number of believers to secure registration as a religious community.

On 7 February 1989, a UGCC delegation headed by bishop Pavlo Vasylyk departed for Moscow to engage in negotiations at which it demanded the Ukrainian Greek-Catholic Church's recognition by the USSR's central authorities.

Expectations were high that the new legislation on the freedom of conscience, which was about to go into effect, would help pave the way for the legalization of the Ukrainian Greek-Catholic Church. However, in May 1989, Kyivan Metropolitan Filaret's actions at that time hindered such possibilities. During a press conference in Lviv – in the presence of the head of the Council for Religious Affairs in Ukraine (M. Kolesnyk) – the metropolitan announced that the new law did "not legitimize" the Uniates. Furthermore, the Orthodox hierarch suggested that Ukrainian Greek-Catholics should attend services at functioning Roman Catholic churches, while those who felt a close affinity to the Eastern Byzantine Rite should attend Orthodox churches. Finally, Metropolitan Filaret remarked that the legalization of the Uniate Church could provoke clashes between the Orthodox and Greek-Catholics.

== Intensification for the legalization of the UGCC ==
In response to Metropolitan Filaret's assertion that the Ukrainian Greek-Catholic Church would never attain legal status, on 16 May 1989, 4 bishops and 10 priests of the UGCC submitted a formal appeal to General Secretary Mikhail Gorbachev. In their declaration, the church officials refuted 160 political accusations aimed at the Ukrainian Greek-Catholic Church, voiced their support for Gorbachev's reforms and demanded the legalization of the UGCC.

On 16 May 1989, prior to the congress of USSR deputies, another delegation arrived in Moscow composed of bishops Pavlo Vasylyk, Sofron Dmyterko, Fylymon Kurchaba and Rev. H. Simkailo, Rev. Volodymyr Viytyshyn, Rev. T. Senkiw (at present the apostolic administrator of the Stryi Eparchy) and Rev. Ihor Vozniak, as well as a number of religious faithful to meet with the Presidium of the Supreme Soviet of the USSR.

On 17 May, after government officials did not appear for a scheduled meeting with the delegation, the UGCC bishops and priests began a hunger strike which caught the attention of the international broadcasting media and also appeared on the first pages of the press. On 18 May, the delegation was met by a representative of the Presidium of the Supreme Soviet of the USSR who received another formal appeal intended for Mikhail Gorbachev. Following the delegation's departure from Moscow, various groups of Ukrainian Greek-Catholics took turns participating in hunger strikes over the course of the next 4 months in Moscow. Such hunger strikes occurred simultaneously with public prayer services and efforts to entice the Ukrainian delegates of the congress of people's deputies of the USSR, 4 of which, unsuccessfully, attempted to raise the issue of the legalization of the UGCC during the congress's sessions. The Moscow activities of the Ukrainian Greek-Catholics received not only the recognition of the international community but also the support of Russian Orthodox dissidents and various democratic circles. However, the hunger strikers' most significant achievement occurred when the reforms-oriented newspaper Moskovskiye Novosti began to publish objective and favorable reports. It raised doubts about the official Soviet version regarding the "unification of the Uniates" and accused the Russian Orthodox Church of condoning the repressive Stalinist methods being used against supporters of the Ukrainian Greek-Catholic Church.

The legalization of the Ukrainian Greek-Catholic Church posed a serious threat to the status of the Russian Orthodox Church in Western Ukraine. As a result, the Moscow Patriarchate and Volodymyr Shcherbytsky's party apparatchiks took decisive measures to prevent legalization. In May–June 1989, the question of the Uniate Church caused a schism amongst the ranks of Soviet politicians, which in turn delayed the legislative passage of the long-awaited "Law on the Freedom of Conscience." Furthermore, the issue of the UGCC also led to the replacement of K. Kharchev by Y. Khrystoradnov as head of the Council for Religious Affairs of the USSR. In addition, Y. Kashliev, as head of the delegation at the Vienna conference, stated that every religious denomination had the right to be registered. The discussion surrounding the UGCC – which hitherto was considered an internal issue of the Russian Orthodox Church – now became the responsibility of the state. Kashliev also underscored the fact that the Uniate question should be settled as quickly as possible.

On 17 September 1989, according to official accounts, close to 100,000 UGCC supporters took part in an unprecedented demonstration in Lviv. Large demonstrations began to take place in other cities of Western Ukraine at this time as well. The movement for legalization, headed by Ivan Hel, was now being augmented by the Ukrainian urban intelligentsia which began organizing itself into various informal associations, including The Popular Movement of Ukraine for Restructuring.

On 20 September 1989, Scherbytsky and Viktor Chebrykov were ousted from the Politburo of the Central Committee of the Communist Party of the Soviet Union. One week later (28 September) Volodymyr Ivashko replaced Shcerbytsky as 1st Secretary of the Communist Party of Ukraine. Officials in favor of a more conservative line regarding the UGCC were no longer in the top positions of the Ukrainian Communist Party. The plenary session of the Central Committee of the Communist Party of Ukraine (18 October 1989) reflected the Central Committee's deepening indecisiveness regarding the future status of the Ukrainian Greek-Catholic Church.

On the heels of the increasingly tense atmosphere, the parish of Sts. Peter and Paul of the Russian Orthodox Church in Lviv had announced its allegiance to the Ukrainian Autocephalous Orthodox Church (UAOC) on 19 August 1989. Two additional Lviv parishes soon followed suit and subsequently the same steps were taken by a few hundred parishes throughout Galicia. At first, the authorities placed administrative sanctions on the parishes but then cancelled such directives hoping to avoid confrontations with parishioners and the local RUKH affiliates, which had already managed to spread their influence on the UAOC. It cannot be ruled out that Soviet authorities considered the supporters of the Ukrainian Autocephalous Orthodox Church as the "lesser of two evils" when taking into account the Uniates. It is quite possible that Soviet government officials were hoping for an open conflict between the Uniates and supporters of Ukrainian Autocephaly which in turn would cause a division within the Ukrainian national movement.

On 22 October 1989, bishop Ivan Bodnarchuk of the Russian Orthodox Church (a native Galician) – who had very recently relinquished his episcopal duties in Zhytomyr – accepted leadership of the Autocephalous Church in Ukraine.

On 29 October, Ukrainian Greek-Catholics under the guidance of a young priest, Fr. Yaroslav Chukhniy, peacefully took over one of the largest ecclesiastical structures in Lviv, the Church of the Transfiguration of Our Lord. Until the transfer of St. George's Cathedral to the faithful of the UGCC in August 1990, the parish of the Transfiguration served as the spiritual centre of Ukrainian Greek-Catholicism in Galicia.

On 26 November – one week prior to Gorbachev's meeting with Pope John Paul II in Rome – over 100,000 UGCC faithful took part in a demonstration demanding the return of St. George's Cathedral to the Ukrainian Greek-Catholics.

== Partial recognition of the Ukrainian Greek-Catholic Church ==
The Apostolic See consistently raised the issue of the rights of Ukrainian Greek-Catholics during its numerous negotiations with the Kremlin – despite minimal reciprocity – ever since Soviet-Vatican relations experienced a thaw beginning in the early 1960s. In June 1988, the Vatican once again expressed its desire for the UGCC's legalization when a delegation to Moscow headed by Cardinals Casaroli and Willebrands took part in the festivities commemorating the Millennium of the Baptism of Kyivan Rus'.

Gorbachev replied to the pope's proposal only in August 1989. Official correspondence had been established between the Kremlin and the Moscow Patriarchate on one side and the Apostolic See on the other side. Gorbachev maintained that it was both the Vatican's and the Moscow Patriarchate's obligation to reach a consensus regarding the Ukrainian Greek-Catholic question. Shortly afterwards, in a letter addressed to Pope John Paul II on 16 August 1989, Patriarch Pimen put forth a proposal which was unacceptable to the Vatican. In his missive, the Russian Orthodox hierarch recommended the de facto liquidation of the Ukrainian Greek-Catholic Church by way of adjoining the Uniates who place the Eastern Rite above Catholic dogma – to the Orthodox Church, and those Uniates who favor Catholicism – to the Roman Catholic Church.

Moscow based its strategy on the hope of benefiting from the disparity within the Ukrainian Greek-Catholic Church in the form of its "Eastern" and "Roman" orientations. Furthermore, the Russian Orthodox Church banked on taking advantage of the decades-long discord between the Vatican and the UGCC's émigré activists who were demanding the appointment of a separate patriarch for Ukrainian Greek-Catholics outside Ukraine. A potential settlement in the form of a compromise had been discussed when Archbishop Angelo Sodano (the Vatican's Secretary of State) visited Moscow on 19–21 October 1989, and met with M. Gorbachev, Soviet Foreign Affairs Minister Eduard Shevardnadze, and the head of the Council for Religious Affairs, Y. Khrystoradnov. As a result of the meeting, the Vatican was assured that the new law on the freedom of conscience and religious organizations in essence will legalize the UGCC. Nevertheless, the Soviet authorities insisted that specific aspects of the legalization process be coordinated between the Vatican, the Kremlin and the Moscow Patriarchate based on the principles of genuine ecumenical dialogue between the Roman Catholic and Russian Orthodox Churches.

The pope's expectations for the legalization of the UGCC in the Soviet Union were once again put forward in his response to Patriarch Pimen's August letter which in turn was presented to the Holy Synod on 1 November 1989, by Cardinal Willebrands and his successor as head of the Pontifical Council for Promoting Christian Unity, Cardinal Edward Cassidy. The Moscow Patriarchate had agreed only on the legal right of Ukrainian Greek-Catholics to practice their faith. The issue of permitting the UGCC clergy to obtain actual pastoral appointments, and other unresolved questions were to be set aside for future negotiations between the Vatican and the Moscow Patriarchate. This position was presented to the Pope in the form of a letter from Patriarch Pimen, delivered to Rome by Metropolitan Yuvenaliy on 27 November.

Mikhail Gorbachev's meeting with Pope John Paul II on 1 December 1989, marked a rapprochement between the Vatican and the Kremlin. The Roman Pontiff once again expressed his will for Roman Catholics and Greek-Catholics to have the possibility of freely practicing their faith, while Gorbachev assured John Paul II that the future law on freedom of conscience would provide religious freedom to everyone in the USSR. The meeting laid the foundation for establishing bilateral diplomatic relations, and the pope accepted Gorbachev's invitation to visit the Soviet Union. Realizing that the outright legalization of the Uniate Church would cause religious unrest in Western Ukraine and would lead to conflict with the Moscow Patriarchate, Gorbachev refused to delegate direct responsibility to the government regarding the settlement of the UGCC question. Instead, the Soviet leader decided that these issues should be settled according to the principles of ecumenical dialogue between the Moscow Patriarchate and the Vatican.

On 1 December 1989, the Soviet news agency Novosti (News) and news services in Western Ukraine outlined the key points of "The Declaration of the Council for Religious Affairs Addressed to the Council of Ministers of the Ukrainian S.S.R.," dated 20 November. The Lviv municipal press labeled the "Declaration" a de facto recognition of the long-banned Ukrainian Greek-Catholic Church. At the same time though, the Declaration asserted that Ukrainian Greek-Catholics will be able to enjoy all the rights guaranteed by the law on registration of associations in the Ukrainian S.S.R., as long as they [the UGCC faithful] uphold the principles of the Constitution of the Ukrainian S.S.R. and the latter's legislation on religious beliefs. All religious structures arbitrarily appropriated by the UGCC faithful were to be returned to local administrative authorities. The transfer of such property to religious communities would take place according to the will of the faithful themselves. If necessary, the "Declaration" called for holding local referendums to be monitored by independent observers, and cautioned against undue influence on the faithful, to guarantee an objective and unbiased vote.

At the same time, the head of the Council for Religious Affairs of the Ukrainian S.S.R., M. P. Kolesnyk, underscored that the council had not considered the canonical status of the infrastructure and hierarchies of the Ukrainian Greek-Catholic Church. Instead, it had only taken into account the rights of a "community of believers" to apply for state registration (recognition) and the possibility for the denationalization (privatization) of inactive church structures. Furthermore, there was no talk of returning ecclesiastical structures and property – nationalized by the state – to the UGCC, nor of annulling the Lviv pseudo-Sobor of 1946, nor of a formal rehabilitation of the Church or even any kind of compensation for losses incurred over the decades.

In response to the promise for legalization, the Ukrainian Greek-Catholics reappropriated their former churches from the Russian Orthodox Church. By January 1990, over 120 churches in Galicia had been returned to the UGCC. By the end of the month, this number had increased to 230 churches on the territory of the Lviv and Ternopil eparchies, and to 140 on the territory of the Ivano-Frankivsk eparchy.

By June 1990, 803 churches had been returned to the Ukrainian Greek-Catholics in newly established (albeit for the most part unregistered) Uniate parishes in the Lviv eparchy, including approximately 500 churches in the Ivano-Frankivsk eparchy and 12 in Transcarpathia. Close to 370 Orthodox priests had converted to the UGCC in Galicia. This increased the overall quantity of Greek-Catholic priests to 767 (including 186 monks). In general, 1,592 Greek-Catholic parishes had been established and 1,303 churches were taken over in Galicia by early summer 1990. In addition, newly established seminaries accepted 485 students, while approximately 700 nuns were active in the Ukrainian Greek-Catholic Church throughout Western Ukraine. At the same time, close to 500 Orthodox parishes converted to the UAOC.

The massive reappropriation by the Ukrainian Greek-Catholics of their former churches spurred a wave of protests on the part of the Moscow Patriarchate. Supporters of the Russian Orthodox Church accused the Uniates of illegally taking over churches, threatening the Orthodox faithful and persecuting the clergy.

The change in the party and governmental leadership of the Ukrainian S.S.R. impacted the Russian Orthodox Church as well. In 1989, the leadership of the exarchate found it necessary to make a number of concessions regarding the Ukrainian language. In January 1990, the Ukrainian Exarchate of the Russian Orthodox Church was retitled the Ukrainian Orthodox Church. Shortly after June 1990, the Synod of the Russian Orthodox Church expressed its concern regarding the liquidation of its Church for the benefit of the Uniates and the autocephalous "schismatics" in Western Ukraine. As a result, a special commission of the Holy Synod visited Ukraine, headed by the newly appointed Moscow Patriarch, Aleksei II.

In response to the Declaration of the State Sovereignty of Ukraine on 16 July 1990, in October the Russian Orthodox Church bestowed the right for "self-government" to the Ukrainian Orthodox Church, which, nevertheless, was to remain an integral component of the Moscow Patriarchate. The creation of the UAOC – although limited at that time to the territory of Galicia – posed a much greater, long-term threat to the ROC than the revival of the UGCC, because the autocephalous church boasted supporters in traditional Orthodox territories of Eastern Ukraine.

On 19 August 1990, the Ukrainian Greek-Catholic Church received possession of the historic Cathedral of St. George in Lviv. In September 1990, 250 students began their studies at the archeparchial seminary in Rudno, while 47 seminarians initiated their studies at the seminary in Drohobych. In addition, approximately 300 students were attending improvised lectures on theology in Ivano-Frankivsk. Similarly, the Basilians opened a minor seminary for 70 students and a novitiate at their monastery in Krekhiv.

In a state of increasing tension between the Orthodox and Ukrainian Greek-Catholics, a Vatican delegation once again met with its counterparts from the Moscow Patriarchate on 10 September 1990, in Moscow. These delegations, in turn, were soon joined by three Ukrainian Greek-Catholic bishops and their Orthodox counterparts. However, on 14 September, the Russian Orthodox delegates exited the negotiations after the Ukrainian Greek-Catholic delegation unanimously rejected the demands of the Orthodox to return the reappropriated Uniate churches in Lviv and Ivano-Frankivsk. Soon afterwards, the trilateral, inter-denominational Lviv regional commission fell apart when representatives of the Ukrainian Orthodox Church and Ukrainian Autocephalous Orthodox Church resigned their positions in the negotiating body after accusing the local authorities of favoring the UGCC in the settlement of church property ownership.

In the fall of 1990, the head of the Ukrainian Greek-Catholic Church, Cardinal Myroslav Lubachivsky, declared his intention to visit the faithful in Ukraine in the spring of 1991.

== See also ==
- Ukrainian Greek-Catholic Church
- History of Christianity in Ukraine
- Dissolution of the Soviet Union
- Holy See–Russia relations
