= Petro Holiney =

Ukrainian Greek Catholic bishop

- Titular Bishop of Abrittum, Auxiliary Bishop of Eparchy of Kolomyia
- Church: Ukrainian Greek Catholic Church
- Appointed: 12 July 2023
- Previous post: Chancellor of Apostolic Exarchate of Italy (2020–2023)

Orders
- Ordination: 29 November 1998 (Priest) by Pavlo Vasylyk
- Consecration: 20 August 2023 (Bishop) by Sviatoslav Shevchuk

Personal details
- Born: Petro Vasyliovych Holiney; 12 July 1973 (age 52) Dobrotiv, Ivano-Frankivsk Oblast, Ukrainian SSR
- Denomination: Ukrainian Greek Catholic
- Coat of arms

Bishop Petro Holiney (Ukrainian: Петро Голіней; born 12 July 1973) is a Ukrainian Greek Catholic hierarch, who serves as Titular Bishop of Abrittum and Auxiliary Bishop of the Eparchy of Kolomyia since 12 July 2023.

== Early life and formation ==
Bishop Holiney was born in a family with a five children in the village Dobrotiv of Ivano-Frankivsk Oblast. After graduation from the school education, he joined the Ivano-Frankivsk Theological Institute of Greek-Catholic Church, where extramurally completed his philosophical and theological studies from 1991 until 1996 with the qualification of teacher of religion. In the same time he belonged to the group of priests and seminarians, united around Fr. Mykhailo Kosylo, clandestine priest and educator, where Petro Holiney completed his seminarian formation. He was ordained as a deacon on 9 April 1992 by Bishop Sofron Dmyterko for then the Eparchy of Ivano-Frankivsk, incardinated into the newly created Eparchy of Kolomyia – Chernivtsi on 20 April 1993 and lately ordained as a priest on 29 November 1998 by Bishop Pavlo Vasylyk for this circumscription.

== Pastoral and educational career ==
After his diaconal ordination, Fr. Holiney was responsible for the restoration of the Greek-Catholic parishes in the Chernivtsi Oblast and, from 1996 to 1998, he carried out his pastoral ministry in the Deliatyn parish. From 1997 to 2001 he studied at the Vasyl Stefanyk Precarpathian National University in Ivano-Frankivsk, obtaining a diploma in history. After his priestly ordination, he held the position of assistant priest of Deliatyn parish and, later, he was in charge of youth ministry in the deanery of Yaremche (2000–2014), history teacher in the state school #1 in Deliatyn (2003-2016) and dean of the district of Yaremche (2014–2016).

From 2005 to 2007 Fr. Holiney deepened his theological studies at the Pontifical Institute of Theology in Warsaw, Poland, obtaining a master's in Theology in 2010 and a licentiate degree in 2015, and from 2016 he attended courses at the Pontifical Oriental Institute in Rome, Italy, obtaining a Doctorate in Church History in 2020. From 3 December 2020, he served as Chancellor of the Ukrainian Catholic Apostolic Exarchate of Italy and from 1 August 2022, he was the parish priest of the Cathedral Church of Our Lady of Zhirovytsia and Saints Sergius and Bacchus in Rome.

== Bishop ==
On 12 July 2023 he was confirmed by Pope Francis as an Auxiliary Bishop of the Ukrainian Catholic Eparchy of Kolomyia and appointed as a Titular Bishop of Abrittum. He was consecrated as a bishop by Major Archbishop Sviatoslav Shevchuk and co-consecrators: bishop Vasyl Ivasyuk and bishop Dionisio Lachovicz in the Cathedral of the Transfiguration of Christ in Kolomyia on 20 August 2023.

Catholic Church titles
Preceded by Călin Ioan Bot	Titular Bishop of Abrittum; 2023–	Succeeded by Incumbent
