= Mykola Semenyshyn =

Ukrainian Greek Catholic bishop

- Titular Bishop of Iunca in Mauretania, Auxiliary Bishop of Archeparchy of Ivano-Frankivsk
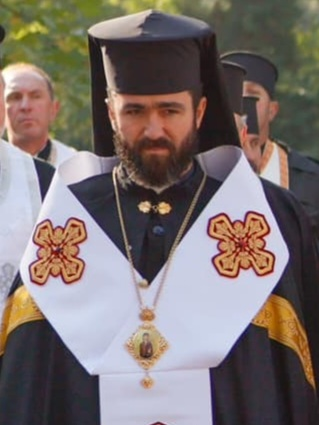
- Church: Ukrainian Greek Catholic Church
- Appointed: 27 October 2022
- Previous posts: Vice Rector of Ivano-Frankivsk Major Theological Seminary (2011–2013), Personal Secretary of Cardinal Lubomyr Husar (2013–2017)

Orders
- Ordination: 29 May 2005 (Priest) by Sofron Mudry
- Consecration: 15 February 2023 (Bishop) by Sviatoslav Shevchuk

Personal details
- Born: Mykola Semenyshyn; 29 May 1982 (age 44) Hlyboka, Ivano-Frankivsk Oblast, Ukrainian SSR
- Denomination: Ukrainian Greek Catholic
- Motto: Відчали на глибінь (Ukrainian for "Put out into deep water")
- Coat of arms

Bishop Mykola Semenyshyn (Ukrainian: Микола Семенишин; born 29 May 1982) is a Ukrainian Greek Catholic hierarch as Titular Bishop of Iunca in Mauretania and Auxiliary Bishop of the Archeparchy of Ivano-Frankivsk since 27 October 2022.

== Early life and formation ==
Bishop Semenyshyn was born in a family with three children as a middle child in the village Hlyboke (until 2018 it was named Hlyboka) of Ivano-Frankivsk Oblast. After graduation from the school education in Hlyboke and Bohorodchany, he joined the Major Theological Seminary in Ivano-Frankivsk, where completed his philosophical and theological studies from 1999 until 2005. He was ordained as a deacon on 25 November 2004 and as a priest on 29 May 2005. Both ordinations were made by Bishop Sofron Mudry for then the Eparchy of Ivano-Frankivsk.

== Pastoral career ==
Fr. Semenyshyn continued his studies in Rome, Italy, where he attended the Pontifical Institute of Spirituality Teresianum (2005–2008), receiving a licentiate degree in spiritual theology. During 2009–2011 he worked as a parish priest in the Roman Catholic Diocese of Pinerolo for the faithful of the Latin and Ukrainian rites. After returning to Ukraine in 2011 he served as vice rector of Ivano-Frankivsk Major Theological Seminary (2011–2013), personal assistant to Cardinal Lubomyr Husar (2013–2017), and spiritual director of the Three Saint Hierarchs Major Theological Seminary in Kyiv (2017–2023).

== Bishop ==
On 27 October 2022 he was confirmed by Pope Francis as an Auxiliary Bishop of the Ukrainian Catholic Archeparchy of Ivano-Frankivsk and appointed as a Titular Bishop of Iunca in Mauretania. He was consecrated as a bishop by Major Archbishop Sviatoslav Shevchuk and co-consecrators: metropolitan Volodymyr Viytyshyn and bishop Bohdan Dzyurakh in the Cathedral of the Resurrection of Christ in Ivano-Frankivsk on 15 February 2023.

Catholic Church titles
Preceded by Luis Sáinz Hinojosa	Titular Bishop of Iunca in Mauretania; 2022–	Succeeded by Incumbent
