= Missionary Congregation of Saint Andrew the Apostle =

Catholic congregation in Ukraine

- Formation: 30 November 1997
- Founder: Fr. Irineusz Mariusz Michalik
- Type: Greek Catholic religious institute
- Headquarters: 6 Selyanska str., Ivano-Frankivsk, Ukraine
- Location: Various
- Region served: Ukraine
- Superior General: Rev. Ivan Pavlo Senkiv, C.M.S.A.A.
- Website: Official website

The Missionary Congregation of Saint Andrew the Apostle (С.M.S.A.A. Latin: Congregationem missionariam S. Andreæ Apostoli, Ukrainian: Місійне згромадження святого апостола Андрія) is a congregation of the Ukrainian Greek Catholic Church that is present in Ukraine and Italy and that has its Mother House in Ivano-Frankivsk, Ukraine. The congregation was established as eparchial right in the Ukrainian Catholic Eparchy of Ivano-Frankivsk by Fr. Irineusz Michalik on 30 November 1997 with benediction of the Eparchial Bishop emeritus Sofron Dmyterko, O.S.B.M.

== History ==
After the collapse of the Soviet Union the religious life became to flourish in the Ukrainian Greek Catholic Church in independent Ukraine. Some old communities have been restored and new ones established. In 1997 among them was founded a new missionary congregation under patronage of St. Andrew the Apostle, who is considered in the early Christian history of Ukraine as missionary and preacher on the southern borders of modern-day Ukraine, along the Black Sea. Founder is Fr. Irineusz Mariusz Michalik, who was born in 1967 in Poland, but was ordained as Ukrainian Greek Catholic priest for the Eparchy of Ivano-Frankivsk.

== Notable members ==
- Yosafat Moschych, Superior General (2003–2013) and auxiliary bishop of the Ukrainian Catholic Archeparchy of Ivano-Frankivsk (since 2014).
