= Yakiv Tymchuk =

Ukrainian Greek Catholic bishop (1919–1988)

Yakiv Tymchuk, O.S.B.M.
- Ukrainian Catholic Eparchy of Ivano-Frankivsk (auxiliary)
- Church: Ukrainian Greek Catholic Church
- Appointed: 1977

Orders
- Ordination: 3 January 1943 (Priest) by Bl. Hryhorij Lakota
- Consecration: 26 November 1977 (Bishop) by Sofron Dmyterko

Personal details
- Born: Yaroslav Hryhorovych Tymchuk; 24 August 1919 Duplyska, Second Polish Republic, now Ukraine
- Died: 20 December 1988 (aged 69) Chortkiv, Soviet Union, now Ukraine

Yakiv Yaroslav Tymchuk, O.S.B.M. (Ukrainian: Яків Ярослав Тимчук; 24 August 1919 – 20 December 1988) was a Ukrainian Greek Catholic clandestine hierarch. He was an auxiliary bishop of the Ukrainian Catholic Eparchy of Ivano-Frankivsk from 1977 to 1988.

== Life ==
Born in Duplyska, Second Polish Republic (present-day – Ternopil Oblast, Ukraine) in 1919 and in 1934 joined the religious Order of Saint Basil the Great. He was professed on 31 March 1936, solemn professed on 27 September 1942 and was ordained a priest on 3 January 1943 by Blessed Bishop Hryhorij Lakota. After ordination he served a short time in the monastery in Hoshiv and then as parish priest in Chortkiv. He was arrested, because the Communist regime abolished the Greek-Catholic Church, but after short time released from prison and clandestinely continued to serve as priest.

On 26 November 1977 Fr. Tymchuk was consecrated to the Episcopate as auxiliary bishop. The principal and single consecrator was clandestine bishop Sofron Dmyterko.

He died on 20 December 1988.
