= Stepan Vaprovych =

Ukrainian Greek Catholic clandestine hierarch

- Ukrainian Catholic Eparchy of Ivano-Frankivsk (auxiliary)
- Church: Ukrainian Greek Catholic Church
- Appointed: April 1945

Orders
- Ordination: 1926 (Priest) by Bl. Hryhoriy Khomyshyn
- Consecration: April 1945 (Bishop) by Bl. Hryhoriy Khomyshyn

Personal details
- Born: Stepan Vaprovych; 1 May 1899 Ivane-Puste, Austrian-Hungarian Empire, now Ukraine
- Died: 2 March 1964 (aged 64) Ivane-Puste, Soviet Union, now Ukraine

Stepan Vaprovych (Ukrainian: Степан Вапрович; 1 May 1899 – 2 March 1964) was a Ukrainian Greek Catholic clandestine hierarch. He was an auxiliary bishop of the Ukrainian Catholic Eparchy of Ivano-Frankivsk from 1945 to 1964.

== Biography ==
Born in Ivane-Puste, Austrian-Hungarian Empire (present-day – Ternopil Oblast, Ukraine) in 1899 and was ordained a priest on 1926 by Blessed Bishop Hryhoriy Khomyshyn. After ordination he served a short time in the village Tsenyava and then, from 1927, as missionary priest in Apóstoles, Argentina. After returning in Ukraine from 1935 until 1939 Fr. Vaprovych was a prefect in the Stanislaviv Theological Seminary, and from 1939 until 1941 served as priest in the Apostolic Exarchate of Lemkowszczyzna. He was arrested, because the Communist regime persecuted and abolished the Greek-Catholic Church, and exiled in Siberia in 1945. after returning he worked as carpenter and constructor and served as clandestine bishop until his death.

In April 1945 Fr. Vaprovych was consecrated to the Episcopate as auxiliary bishop. The principal and single consecrator was Blessed Bishop Hryhoriy Khomyshyn, who a short time later was arrested and imprisoned by Communists.

He died in his native village on 2 March 1964.
