= Ukrainian Catholic Eparchy of Chernivtsi =

Ukrainian Greek Catholic eparchy in Ukraine

Eparchy of Chernivtsi Eparchia Chernivcensis Ucrainorum Українська Греко-Католицька Чернівецька Єпархія

Location
- Country: Ukraine
- Territory: all Chernivtsi Oblast
- Ecclesiastical province: Archeparchy of Ivano-Frankivsk
- Headquarters: Chernivtsi, Ukraine

Statistics
- Area: 8,097 km^{2} (3,126 sq mi)
- Population: Total; Catholics: 909,893 ?

Information
- Sui iuris church: Ukrainian Greek Catholic
- Rite: Byzantine
- Established: September 12, 2017
- Cathedral: Ukrainian Catholic Cathedral of the Domition of Mather of God in Chernivtsi

Current leadership
- Pope: Francis
- Major Archbishop: Major Archbishop Sviatoslav Shevchuk
- Bishop: Yosafat Moschych Bishop of the Ukrainian Catholic Eparchy of Chernivtsi.
- Metropolitan Archbishop: Volodymyr Viytyshyn Metropolitan of the Ukrainian Catholic Archeparchy of Ivano-Frankivsk

Map

The Eparchy of Chernivtsi is a Ukrainian Greek Catholic eparchy of the Catholic Church situated in Ukraine. The eparchy is a suffragan of the Ukrainian Catholic Archeparchy of Ivano-Frankivsk. The eparchy was established on 12 September 2017.

== History ==
- September 12, 2017: Established as Eparchy of Chernivtsi from the Ukrainian Catholic Eparchy of Kolomyia – Chernivtsi.

== Eparchial bishops ==
The following is a list of the bishops of Chernivtsi and their terms of service:

- (since 12 September 2017 – ) Yosafat Moschych

== See also ==
- Ukrainian Greek Catholic Church
- Catholic Church
