= Symeon Lukach =

Ukrainian Catholic bishop

Blessed Symeon Lukach
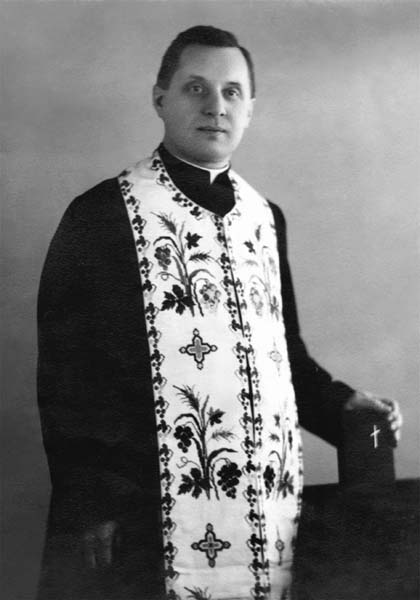
- Born: 7 July 1893; Starunya, Kingdom of Galicia and Lodomeria, Austro-Hungarian Empire
- Died: 22 August 1964 (aged 71); Starunya, Ukrainian Soviet Socialist Republic, Soviet Union
- Venerated in: Roman Catholic Church, Ukrainian Catholic Church
- Beatified: 27 June 2001, Lviv, Ukraine by Pope John Paul II
- Feast: June 28

Symeon Lukach (Ukrainian: Симеон Лукач; 7 July 1893 – 22 August 1964) was a Ukrainian Greek Catholic bishop and martyr.

Lukach was born in the village of Starunya, Stanislaviv Region. His parents were peasant farmers. He entered the seminary in 1913. His studies were interrupted for two years during World War I, he finished in 1919. In that year, he was ordained a priest by Bishop Hryhory Khomyshyn. He taught moral theology at the seminary in Stanislaviv until April 1945 when Khomyshyn ordained him a bishop.

He was first arrested on 26 October 1949 by the NKVD and deported to Siberia (Krasnoyarsk) for ten years hard labor. After serving half his sentence, he was released on 11 February 1955. After this, he served as an underground member of the clergy. In July 1962, he was arrested for a second time. He appeared in court with Bishop Ivan Slezyuk who was also an underground bishop. He was sentenced to five more years of labor where he underwent interrogations. While he was in prison, he developed tuberculosis. He was released back to his village where he died on 22 August 1964.

He was beatified on 27 June 2001 by Pope John Paul II.

After his first arrest in 1949, Fr Symeon wrote in his autobiography: “I celebrated divine liturgy in an apartment and in a few houses. From one to 30 people took part in the services I also baptized and celebrated marriages But conscience does not allow me to mention their names, so that my mistake will not cause those people who sought spiritual help from me to suffer. I acted in good faith, serving God’s will, so I was in danger of colliding with state laws. If the state finds me guilty, I myself will take the responsibility.”
