= Mykola Simkaylo =

- Bishop of Ukrainian Catholic Eparchy of Kolomyia – Chernivtsi
- Church: Ukrainian Greek Catholic Church
- Appointed: 2 June 2005
- Predecessor: Volodymyr Viytyshyn
- Successor: Vacant

Orders
- Ordination: 15 May 1974 (Priest) by Pavlo Vasylyk
- Consecration: 12 July 2005 (Bishop) by Lubomyr Husar

Personal details
- Born: Mykola Mykhaylovych Simkaylo; 21 November 1952 Karaganda, Kazakh SSR
- Died: 21 May 2013 (aged 60) Kolomyia, Ivano-Frankivsk Oblast, Ukraine

Mykola Simkaylo (21 November 1952, Kazakhstan – 21 May 2013) was eparch of the Ukrainian Catholic Eparchy of Kolomyia – Chernivtsi in Ukraine since 2 June 2005 until his death.

== Views on ecumenism ==
Bishop Simkaylo was known to be a strong supporter of Christian ecumenism. Speaking to the charity Aid to the Church in Need during a visit, he praised President Yushchenko "personally acting as a catalyst to reconcile the various factions of the Orthodox Church in Ukraine", as well as Major Archbishop Cardinal Lubomyr Husar.

== Citations ==
Catholic Church titles
Preceded by Volodymyr Viytyshyn	Eparchial Bishop of Kolomyia–Chernivtsi; 2005—2013	Succeeded by Vasyl Ivasyuk
