= Yosafat Moschych =

Ukrainian Greek Catholic bishop

Yosafat Moschych, С.M.S.A.A.
- Eparchial Bishop of Ukrainian Catholic Eparchy of Chernivtsi
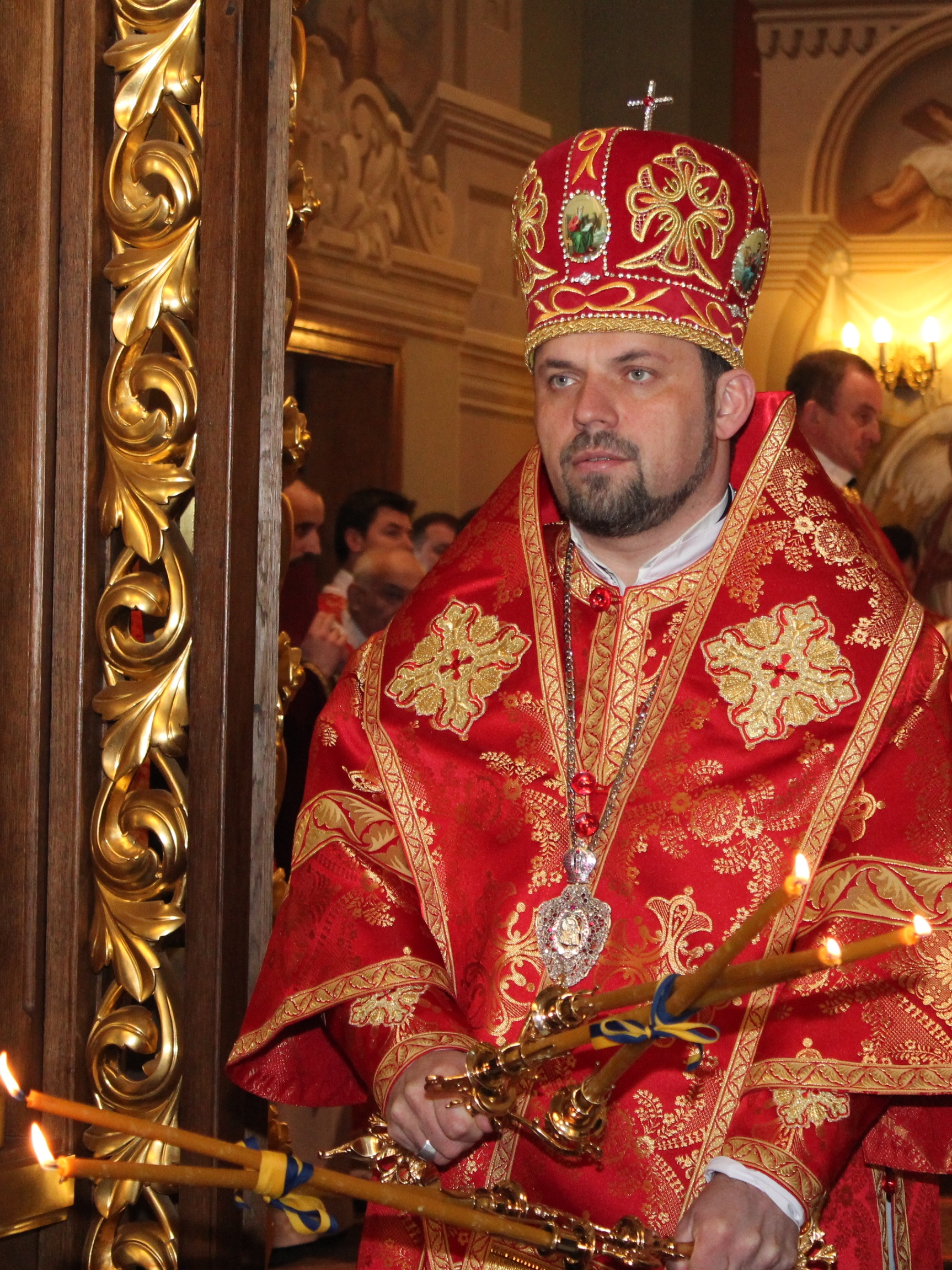
- Church: Ukrainian Greek Catholic Church
- Elected: 12 September 2017
- Predecessor: New Title
- Successor: Incumbent
- Other posts: Superior General of the Missionary Congregation of Saint Andrew the Apostle (2003–2013); Titular Bishop of Pulcheriopolis, Auxiliary Bishop of Ukrainian Catholic Archeparchy of Ivano-Frankivsk (2014–2017)

Orders
- Ordination: 26 Sep 1999 (Priest) by Sofron Mudry
- Consecration: 3 Aug 2014 (Bishop) by Sviatoslav Shevchuk

Personal details
- Born: Bohdan Dmytrovych Moschych; 16 September 1976 (age 50) Staryi Rozdil, Lviv Oblast, Ukrainian SSR
- Education: Pontifical Lateran University
- Coat of arms

Bishop Yosafat Bohdan Moschych, С.M.S.A.A. (Ukrainian: Йосафат Богдан Мощич; born 16 September 1976 in Staryi Rozdil, Mykolaiv Raion, Lviv Oblast, Ukrainian SSR) is a Ukrainian Greek Catholic hierarch as the first eparchial bishop of the new created Ukrainian Catholic Eparchy of Chernivtsi since 12 September 2017. Before he served as the Titular Bishop of Pulcheriopolis and Auxiliary bishop of Ivano-Frankivsk from 27 May 2014 until 12 September 2017.

== Life ==
Bishop Moschych, after graduation of the school education, joined the Theological Seminary in Ivano-Frankivsk in 1994, and then – the new founded Missionary Congregation of Saint Andrew the Apostle on April 25, 1998; he had a profession on August 14, 1999, and a solemn profession on September 15, 2002, and was ordained as priest on September 26, 1999, after graduation of the Theological Seminary. Then he continued his studies in the Pontifical Lateran University, Rome with licentiate degree in moral theology from 2000 until 2002. During 2003–2013 he served as a Superior General of the Missionary Congregation of Saint Andrew the Apostle.

On May 27, 2014, he was confirmed by the Pope Francis as the Auxiliary Bishop of Ivano-Frankivsk, Ukraine and Titular Bishop of Bahanna. On August 3, 2014, he was consecrated as bishop by Major Archbishop Sviatoslav Shevchuk and other hierarchs of the Ukrainian Greek Catholic Church.

Catholic Church titles
Preceded by Michel Pollien	Titular Bishop of Pulcheriopolis; 2014–2017	Succeeded by Daniel Francisco Blanco Méndez
New title	Eparchial Bishop of Chernivtsi; 2017–present	Succeeded by Incumbent
