= Ivasyuk =

Ivasyuk (alternative spelling Ivasiuk; Ukrainian: Івасюк), a family name of Ukrainian origin. It is derived from Ivas or Ivasyk (Ukrainian: Івась or Ukrainian: Івасик), the diminutive form of the Ukrainian name Ivan (Ukrainian: Іван), "John", and the suffix -yuk, denoting descent, especially in the Ukrainian Carpathian mountains area.

The surname may refer to the following notable people:

- Mykhailo Ivasyuk, Ukrainian folklorist
- Mykola Ivasyuk (1865–1937), Ukrainian painter
- Vasyl Ivasyuk (born 1960), Ukrainian Greek Catholic hierarch.
- Veronika Ivasiuk (born 1995), Ukrainian female weightlifter
- Volodymyr Ivasyuk (1949–1979), Ukrainian songwriter (Chervona Ruta), composer and poet.
