= Hryhoriy Balahurak =

Ukrainian Greek Catholic bishop (1909–1965)

Hryhoriy Balahurak, O.S.B.M.
- Ukrainian Catholic Eparchy of Ivano-Frankivsk (auxiliary)
- Church: Ukrainian Greek Catholic Church
- Appointed: April 1945

Orders
- Ordination: 21 May 1936 (Priest) by Bl. Josaphat Kotsylovsky
- Consecration: April 1945 (Bishop) by Bl. Hryhoriy Khomyshyn

Personal details
- Born: Volodymyr Balahurak; 5 July 1909 Stanislaviv, Austrian-Hungarian Empire, now Ukraine
- Died: October 2, 1965 (aged 56) Korkino, Chelyabinsk Oblast, Soviet Union, now Russian Federation

Hryhoriy Volodymyr Balahurak, O.S.B.M. (Ukrainian: Григорій Володимир Балагурак; 5 July 1909 – 2 October 1965) was a Ukrainian Greek Catholic clandestine hierarch. He was an auxiliary bishop of the Ukrainian Catholic Eparchy of Ivano-Frankivsk from 1945 to 1965.

== Life ==
Born in Stanislaviv, Austrian-Hungarian Empire (present-day – Ivano-Frankivsk Oblast, Ukraine) in 1909 and in 1925 joined the religious Order of Saint Basil the Great. He was professed on 1 May 1927, solemn professed on 16 December 1934 and was ordained a priest on 21 May 1936 by Blessed Bishop Josaphat Kotsylovsky. After ordination he served a short time in the monastery in his native Stanislaviv and then, from 1938, as parish priest in Krystynopol. From 1941 until 1945 Fr. Hryhoriy was a superior in the monastery in Stanislaviv. He was arrested, because the Communist regime abolished the Greek-Catholic Church, and exiled in Siberia in October 1949. Released in 1955, but the second time arrested in 1957 and imprisoned until his death.

In April 1945 Fr. Balahurak was consecrated to the Episcopate as auxiliary bishop. The principal and single consecrator was Blessed Bishop Hryhoriy Khomyshyn, who a short time later was arrested and imprisoned by Communists.

He died in exile on 2 October 1965.
