= Ukrainian Catholic Archeparchy of Ivano-Frankivsk =

Ukrainian Greek Catholic archeparchy in Ukraine

Archeparchy of Ivano-Frankivsk Archieparchia Stanislaopolitana Архиєпархія з Івано-Франківська
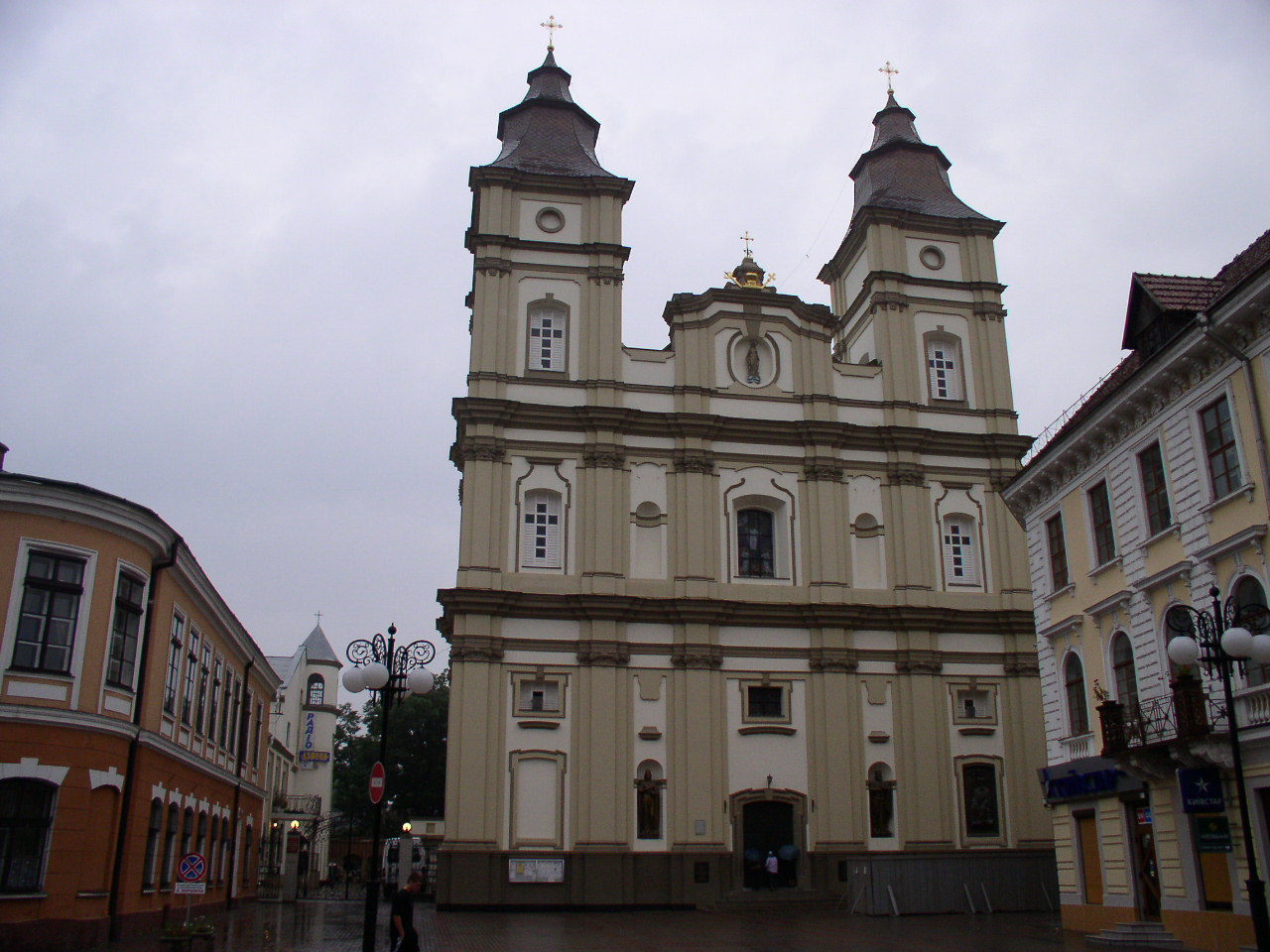
- Cathedral of the Resurrection

- Coat of arms

Location
- Country: Ukraine

Statistics
- Area: 6,700 km^{2} (2,600 sq mi)
- Population: Total; Catholics: (as of 2009); 792,272; 603,918 (76.2%)

Information
- Denomination: Catholic Church
- Sui iuris church: Ukrainian Greek Catholic Church
- Rite: Byzantine Rite
- Established: 26 March 1885
- Cathedral: Cathedral of the Resurrection of Our Saviour in Ivano-Frankivsk

Current leadership
- Pope: Leo XIV
- Major Archbishop: Sviatoslav Shevchuk
- Metropolitan Archbishop: Volodymyr Viytyshyn
- Suffragans: Eparchy of Kolomyia, Eparchy of Chernivtsi
- Auxiliary Bishops: Mykola Semenyshyn

Map

Website
- Website of the Archeparchy

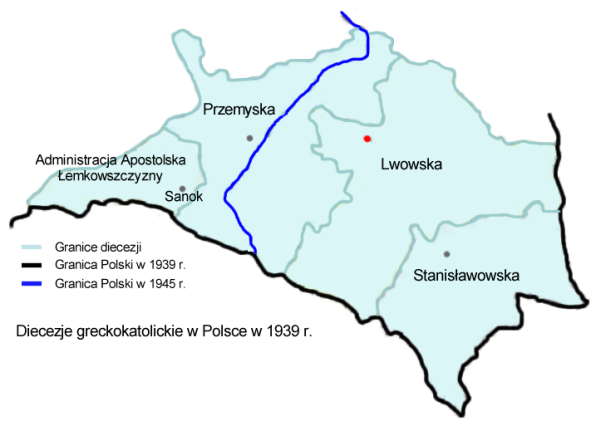
Map of the Ukrainian Catholic Church in the province of Lviv in 1939

The Archparchy of Ivano-Frankivsk (or Ivano-Frankivsk of the Ukrainians) is a Ukrainian Greek Catholic Church ecclesiastical territory or archeparchy of the Catholic Church in Ukraine. It was erected in 2011. It is the metropolitan of an ecclesiastical province located in the western part of Ukraine in the oblasts of Ivano-Frankivsk and Chernivtsi. It has two suffragan eparchies: Kolomyia and Chernivtsi. The incumbent ordinary of the archeparchy is Volodymyr Viytyshyn, who was confirmed by Pope Benedict XVI on 2 June 2005. It is assisted and protected by the Dicastery for the Eastern Churches in Rome. The cathedral church of the archeparchy is the Cathedral of the Resurrection of Our Saviour which is situated in the eponymous city of Ivano-Frankivsk.

== History ==
- Established on March 26, 1885 as Eparchy of Stanislaviv/ Stanislaviv / Ivano-Frankivs’k / Stanislaopolitan(us) (Latin adjective), on territory split off from the Ukrainian Catholic Archeparchy of Lviv, as suffragan see in the ecclesiastical province of Kyiv-Halych.
- November 9, 1962: Renamed as Eparchy of Ivano-Frankivsk.
- April 20, 1993: Lost territory to establish the Ukrainian Catholic Eparchy of Kolomyia – Chernivtsi, now its suffragan.
- Elevated on December 13, 2011 as Metropolitan Archeparchy of Ivano-Frankivsk/ Stanislaviv / Ivano-Frankivs’k / Stanislaopolitan(us) (Latin).

== Ecclesiastical province ==
The metropolis has two suffragan sees :

- Ukrainian Catholic Eparchy of Chernivtsi
- Ukrainian Catholic Eparchy of Kolomyia.

== Statistics ==
As per 2014, it pastorally served 591,157 Catholics (75.8% of 780,117 total) on 6,700 km² in 390 parishes and 55 missions with 457 priests (423 diocesan, 34 religious), 173 lay religious (52 brothers, 121 sisters) and 90 seminarians.

== Episcopal Ordinaries and Auxiliary bishops ==
Eparchs (Bishops) of Stanislaviv/Ivano-Frankivsk

- Yulian Pelesh (27 March 1885 – 22 Sep 1891)
- Julian Sas-Kuilovsky (22 Sep 1891 – 19 June 1899)
- Andrey Sheptytsky, O.S.B.M. (19 June 1899 – 17 Dec 1900)
- Blessed Hryhoriy Khomyshyn (6 May 1904 – 17 Jan 1947)
  - auxiliary bishop Ivan Lyatyshevskyi (24 Nov 1929 – 27 Nov 1957)

In 1946 the Soviet Union prohibited the Greek Catholic Church; all of its properties were appropriated by the Russian Orthodox Church

- Blessed Ivan Slezyuk (April 1945 – 02 Dec 1973)
- Blessed Symeon Lukach (April 1945 – 22 August 1964)
  - Auxiliary bishops:Stepan Vaprovych (April 1945 – 2 March 1964); *Hryhoriy Balahurak (April 1945 – 02 Oct 1965); *Yosafat Fedoryk (1964 – 28 Dec 1979); Sofron Dmyterko (30 Nov 1968 – 16 Jan 1991); Pavlo Vasylyk (1 May 1974 – 16 Jan 1991); Yakiv Tymchuk (1977 – 20 Dec 1988); Iryney Bilyk (15 August 1989 – 16 Jan 1991)

On 16 January 1991, the Holy See publicly confirmed all clandestine consecrations

- Sofron Dmyterko, O.S.B.M. (16 Jan 1991 – 07 Nov 1997)
  - Auxiliary bishops: Pavlo Vasylyk; Iryney Bilyk; Sofron Mudry; Volodymyr Viytyshyn
- Sofron Mudry (7 November 1997 - 2 June 2005)
- Volodymyr Viytyshyn (2 June 2005 - 21 November 2011)

Metropolitan Archeparchs of Ivano-Frankivsk

- Volodymyr Viytyshyn (21 November 2011 – present)
  - Auxiliary bishop: Yosafat Moschych

== Gallery of eparchies ==
Ivano-Frankivsk

Kolomyia

Chernivtsi

== See also ==
- List of Catholic dioceses in Ukraine

== Sources and external links ==
- Profile at GCatholic.org
