= Vasyl Velychkovsky =

Ukrainian bishop and martyr (1903–1973)

Blessed Vasyl Vsevolod Velychkovsky CSsR
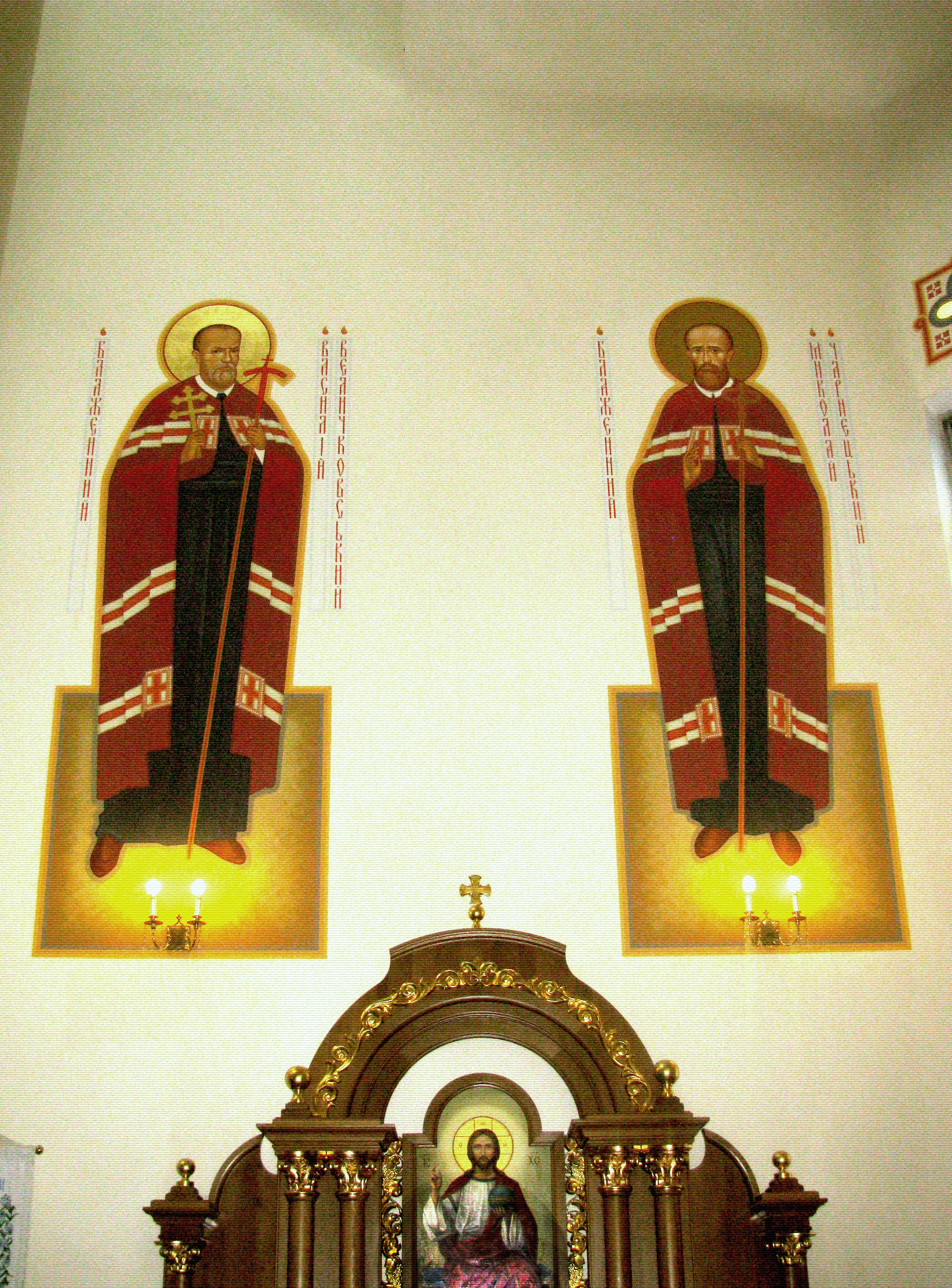
- Blessed Vasyl in his normal clothes, panagia, Redemptorist habit, and rosary

Martyr
- Born: June 1, 1903; Stanislaviv, Austria-Hungary (now Ivano-Frankivsk, Ukraine)
- Died: June 30, 1973 (aged 70); Winnipeg, Manitoba, Canada
- Venerated in: Roman Catholic Church; Ukrainian Greek Catholic Church
- Beatified: 27 June 2001, Lviv Hippodrome, Ukraine by Pope John Paul II
- Major shrine: St. Joseph's Ukrainian Catholic Church, Winnipeg, Manitoba, Canada
- Feast: 27 June, with Nicholas Charnetsky and 24 Companions

Vasyl Vsevolod Velychkovsky, CSsR (Ukrainian: Василь Володимирович Величковський; June 1, 1903 – June 30, 1973) was a Ukrainian religious priest of the Redemptorists and a prelate of the Ukrainian Greek Catholic Church. He is considered a martyr in the Catholic Church, due to his death in 1973 of injuries sustained while imprisoned by the Soviet Union for his faith. He was beatified by Pope John Paul II in 2001.

== Life ==
Velychkovsky was born in Stanislaviv, in then-Austria-Hungary. In 1920, he entered the seminary in Lviv, then in Poland. In 1925, he took his first religious vows in the village of Holosko near Lviv in the Congregation of the Most Holy Redeemer (better known as the Redemptorists) and was ordained a priest. As a priest-monk Vasyl Velychkovsky taught and preached in Volyn, a Ukrainian-majority province in interwar Poland. In 1942, he became abbot of the monastery in German-occupied Ternopil. Because of religious persecution by the Communist Soviet Union he was arrested in 1945 by the NKVD and sent to Kiev. The punishment of death was commuted to 10 years of hard labor.

On release in 1955, he went back to Lviv, and was ordained a bishop in 1963. In 1969, he was imprisoned again for three years for his religious activities. Released in 1972, he was exiled outside the USSR. He died of his injuries from prison in Winnipeg, Manitoba, Canada on June 30, 1973, aged 70.

== Veneration ==
Thirty years after his death, Vasyl Velychkovsky's body was found to be almost incorrupt (his toes had fallen off and the relics were subsequently divided). The body relic of Vasyl Velychkovsky is enshrined at St. Joseph's Ukrainian Catholic Church in Winnipeg, Manitoba, Canada. Today, his shrine is located at 250 Jefferson Avenue, Winnipeg, Manitoba.
