= Ukrainian Catholic Eparchy of Kolomyia =

Ukrainian Greek Catholic eparchy in Ukraine

Eparchy of Kolomyia Eparchia Kolomyiensis Ucrainorum Українська Греко-Католицька Коломийсько Єпархія

Location
- Country: Ukraine
- Territory: 7 Raions of Ivano-Frankivsk Oblast
- Ecclesiastical province: Archeparchy of Ivano-Frankivsk
- Headquarters: Kolomyia, Ivano-Frankivsk Oblast, Ukraine

Statistics
- Area: 14,095 km^{2} (5,442 sq mi)
- Population: Total; Catholics: (as of 2013); 1,238,400; 238,400 (19.3%)

Information
- Sui iuris church: Ukrainian Greek Catholic
- Rite: Byzantine
- Established: 20 April 1993
- Cathedral: Ukrainian Catholic Cathedral of Holy Transfiguration in Kolomyia

Current leadership
- Pope: Francis
- Major Archbishop: Major Archbishop Sviatoslav Shevchuk
- Bishop: Vasyl Ivasyuk Bishop of the Ukrainian Catholic Eparchy of Kolomyia.
- Metropolitan Archbishop: Volodymyr Viytyshyn Metropolitan of the Ukrainian Catholic Archeparchy of Ivano-Frankivsk
- Auxiliary Bishops: Petro Holiney

Map

Website
- Ukrainian Catholic Eparchy of Kolomyia – Chernivtsi

The Eparchy of Kolomyia is a Ukrainian Greek Catholic eparchy of the Catholic Church situated in Ukraine. The eparchy is suffragan to the Ukrainian Catholic Archeparchy of Ivano-Frankivsk. The eparchy was established on 20 April 1993.

== History ==
- 20 April 1993: Established as Eparchy of Kolomyia – Chernivtsi from the Ukrainian Catholic Eparchy of Ivano-Frankivsk.
- 12 September 2017: Lost territory to establish the Ukrainian Catholic Eparchy of Chernivtsi

== Eparchial and auxiliary bishops ==
The following is a list of the bishops of Kolomyia – Chernivtsi and their terms of service:

- (20 Apr 1993 – 12 Dec 2004) Pavlo Vasylyk

(13 May 2003 – 12 Dec 2004) Volodymyr Viytyshyn, coadjutor bishop

- (12 Dec 2004 – 2 Jun 2005) Volodymyr Viytyshyn
- (2 Jun 2005 – 21 May 2013) Mykola Simkaylo
- (22 May 2013 – 13 Feb 2014) Vasyl Ivasyuk, titular bishop of Benda, Archiepiscopal Administrator
- (since 13 Feb 2014 – ) Vasyl Ivasyuk

(since 20 Aug 2023) Petro Holiney, titular bishop of Abrittum, auxiliary
