= Bychkivtsi =

Rural locality in Ternopil Oblast, Ukraine

Bychkivtsi Бичківці
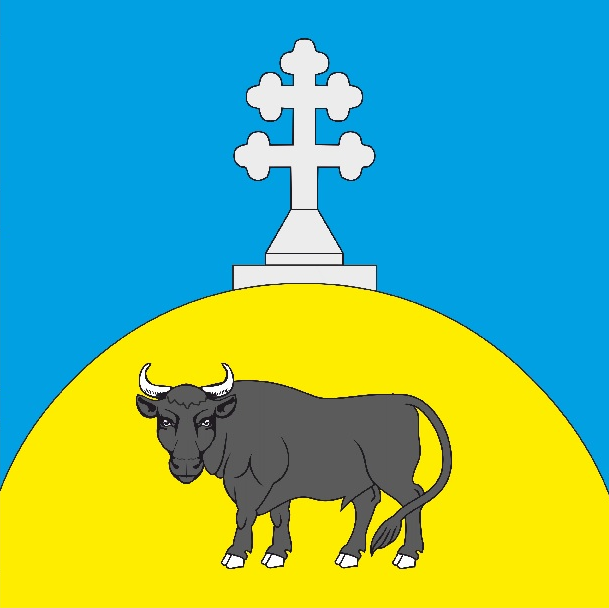
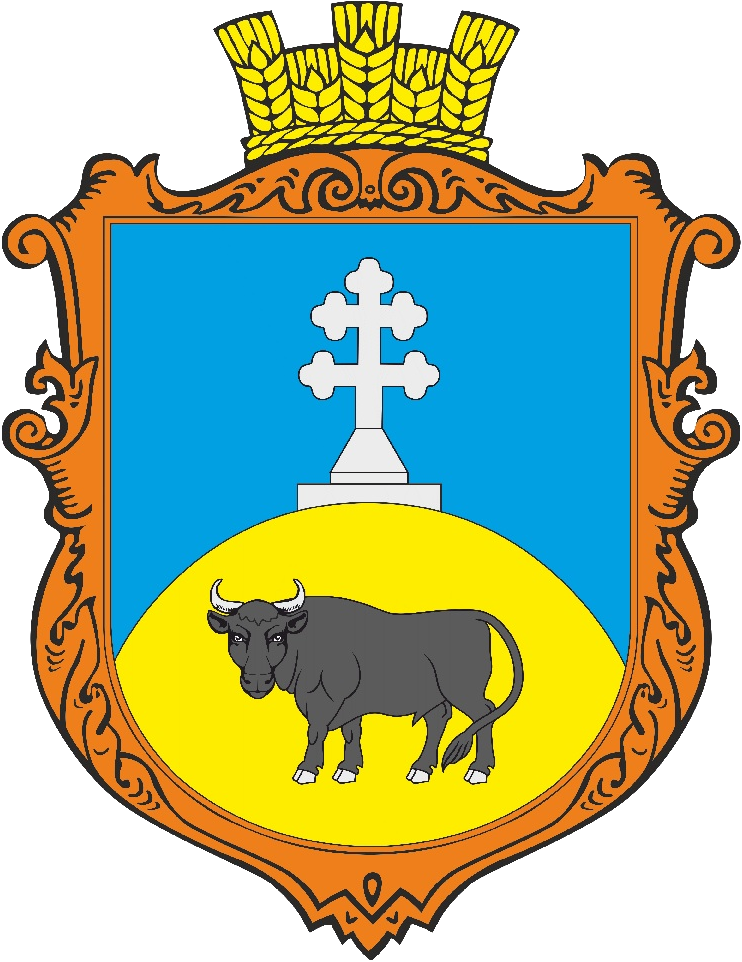
- Flag Coat of arms

- Location in Ternopil Oblast
- Coordinates: 49°5′59″N 25°42′45″E
- Country: Ukraine
- Oblast: Ternopil Oblast
- Raion: Chortkiv Raion
- Hromada: Chortkiv Hromada
- Time zone: UTC+2 (EET)
  - Summer (DST): UTC+3 (EEST)
- Postal code: 48512

Bychkivtsi (Ukrainian: Бичківці) is a village in Ukraine, Ternopil Oblast, Chortkiv Raion, Chortkiv urban hromada.

== History ==
The first written mention is from 1442.

== Religion ==
- Church of John the Baptist (OCU, 1827, brick)
- Chapel of the Transfiguration (UGCC, 1827, restored in 2010)
- Church of Our Lady of Sorrows (RCC, 1895)

== People ==
- Sofron Dmyterko (1917–2008), Ukrainian Bishop of the Ukrainian Greek Catholic Church
