= Ivan Lyatyshevskyi =

Ukrainian Greek Catholic bishop (1879–1957)

- Ukrainian Catholic Eparchy of Stanislaviv (auxiliary); Titular Bishop of Adada
- Church: Ukrainian Greek Catholic Church
- Appointed: 24 November 1929

Orders
- Ordination: 20 October 1907 (Priest) by Bl. Hryhoriy Khomyshyn
- Consecration: 26 January 1930 (Bishop) by Andrey Sheptytsky

Personal details
- Born: Ivan Yulianovych Lyatyshevskyi; 17 October 1879 Bohorodchany, Austrian-Hungarian Empire, now Ukraine
- Died: November 27, 1957 (aged 78) Stanislaviv, now Ivano-Frankivsk, Soviet Union, now Ukraine

Ivan Lyatyshevskyi (Ukrainian: Іван Лятишевський; 17 October 1879 – 27 November 1957) was a Ukrainian Greek Catholic hierarch. He was an auxiliary bishop of the Ukrainian Catholic Eparchy of Ivano-Frankivsk and titular bishop of Adada from 1929 to 1957.

He was born in Bohorodchany, Austrian-Hungarian Empire (present-day – Ivano-Frankivsk Oblast, Ukraine) in 1879 in the family of Yulian and Anna (née Halavay) Lyatyshevskyi and graduated of the Theology at Lviv University and University of Vienna. He then continued in the Collegium Canisianum and made a defence of the doctoral thesis in 1905. He was ordained a priest on 20 October 1907 by Blessed Bishop Hryhoriy Khomyshyn for the Eparchy of Stanislaviv. After ordination, he served a short time in a parish work, but later was a teacher and professor.

He was appointed by the Holy See as an Auxiliary Bishop of the Ukrainian Catholic Eparchy of Stanislaviv on 24 November 1929. He was consecrated to the Episcopate on 26 January 1930 in Stanislaviv. The principal consecrator was Metropolitan Andrey Sheptytskyi, and the principal co-consecrators were Blessed Bishop Hryhoriy Khomyshyn and Blessed Bishop Josaphat Kotsylovsky.

He was arrested on 11 April 1945 alongside other Ukrainian Catholic bishops, because the Communist regime abolished the Greek-Catholic Church, and exiled in Siberia. He was released in 1955.

He died in Stanislaviv on 27 November 1957.
