= Yosafat Fedoryk =

Ukrainian Greek Catholic bishop (1897–1979)

Yosafat Fedoryk, O.S.B.M.
- Ukrainian Catholic Eparchy of Ivano-Frankivsk (auxiliary)
- Church: Ukrainian Greek Catholic Church
- Appointed: 1964
- Other post: clandestine Exarch of Central Asia (1959–1967)

Orders
- Ordination: 1 January 1928 (Priest) by Isaias Papadopoulos
- Consecration: 1964 (Bishop) by Alexander Chira

Personal details
- Born: Yosyf Romanovych Fedoryk; 20 December 1897 Jarosław, Austrian-Hungarian Empire, now Poland
- Died: 28 December 1979 (aged 82) Stryi, Soviet Union, now Ukraine

Yosafat Yosyf Fedoryk, O.S.B.M. (Ukrainian: Йосафат Йосиф Федорик; 20 December 1897 – 28 December 1979) was a Ukrainian Greek Catholic clandestine hierarch. He was Exarch of Central Asia from 1959 (from 1964 in rank of bishop) to 1967 and an auxiliary bishop of the Ukrainian Catholic Eparchy of Ivano-Frankivsk from 1967 to 1979.

Born in Jarosław, Austrian-Hungarian Empire (present-day – Podkarpackie Voivodeship, Poland) on 1897 in the family of railroader Roman Fedoryk and his wife Rozaliya (née Radelitska). After graduation of the Theological Seminary in Lviv he joined the religious Order of Saint Basil the Great. He was professed on 14 March 1923, solemn professed on 18 April 1926 and was ordained a priest on 1 January 1928 by Bishop Isaias Papadopoulos, while studying at Pontifical Gregorian University. After ordination he served in the different Basilian monasteries. From 1944 until 1945 Fr. Fedoryk was a superior in the monastery in Zolochiv.

He was arrested on 1945, because the Communist regime abolished the Greek-Catholic Church, and imprisoned until his release in 1948, but the second time arrested in 1952 and released on 1960. He remained in exile until 1967. During his second imprisonment he was appointed by Yosyf Slipyi as Exarch for the Greek-Catholics in the Central Asia with the centre in Frunze And in 1964 Fr. Fedoryk was clandestinely consecrated to the Episcopate by Bishop Alexander Chira in Karaganda.

Bishop Fedoryk returned from exile on 1967 and died on 28 December 1979.
