= Pavlo Vasylyk =

Polish-born Ukrainian Greek Catholic bishop and Soviet dissident

- Ukrainian Catholic Eparchy of Kolomyia – Chernivtsi
- Church: Ukrainian Greek Catholic Church
- Appointed: 1 May 1974
- In office: April 20, 1993–December 12, 2004
- Predecessor: New creation
- Successor: Volodymyr Viytyshyn
- Other post: Auxiliary Bishop of Ukrainian Greek Catholic Eparchy of Ivano-Frankivsk (1991–1993)

Orders
- Ordination: 1950 (deacon) by Viktor Novikov; 18 November 1956 (priest) by Bl. Nicholas Charnetsky
- Consecration: 1 May 1974 (bishop) by Yosafat Fedoryk

Personal details
- Born: Pavlo Yakymovych Vasylyk; 8 August 1926 Borysławka, Second Polish Republic
- Died: 12 December 2004 (aged 78) Kolomyia, Ukraine

Pavlo Vasylyk (Ukrainian: Павло Василик; 8 August 1926 – 12 December 2004) was a Ukrainian Greek Catholic hierarch. He was clandestine bishop from 1974 to 1991, an auxiliary bishop of the Ukrainian Catholic Eparchy of Ivano-Frankivsk from 1991 to 1993 and the first eparchial bishop of the new created Ukrainian Catholic Eparchy of Kolomyia – Chernivtsi from 1993 until his death in 2004.

== Biography ==
Born in Borysławka, Second Polish Republic (present-day – Podkarpackie Voivodeship, Poland) on 1926 in the Greek-Catholic peasant family with 11 children. On 1945 was transferred in the Ukrainian SSR in time of the Expulsion of Ukrainians from Poland to the Soviet Union. On 1947 he was arrested and imprisoned in Siberia, until 1955. After his release was ordained as priest on 18 November 1956 by Blessed Bishop Nicholas Charnetsky. After ordination he served a short time in the clandestine parishes of the Western Ukraine and Crimea, until his second arrest on 1959. He was again imprisoned in concentration camp in Mordovia and released on 1964, but remained in exile until 1969.

On 1 May 1974 Fr. Vasylyk was consecrated to the Episcopate as auxiliary bishop. The principal and single consecrator was clandestine bishop Yosafat Fedoryk. Bishop Vasylyk was among these persons, who on 4 August 1987 made a declaration about exit from clandestinity of the Ukrainian Greek Catholic Church.

On 20 April 1993 he was appointed as the first bishop of the new created Ukrainian Catholic Eparchy of Kolomyia – Chernivtsi.

He died on 12 December 2004.

== Awards ==
- Ukraine
  - Order of Merit (3rd class)

Catholic Church titles
New title	Eparchial Bishop of Kolomyia – Chernivtsi; 1993–2004	Succeeded by Volodymyr Viytyshyn
