= Volodymyr Viytyshyn =

Ukrainian Greek Catholic archbishop

- Archbishop-Metropolitan of Ukrainian Catholic Archeparchy of Ivano-Frankivsk
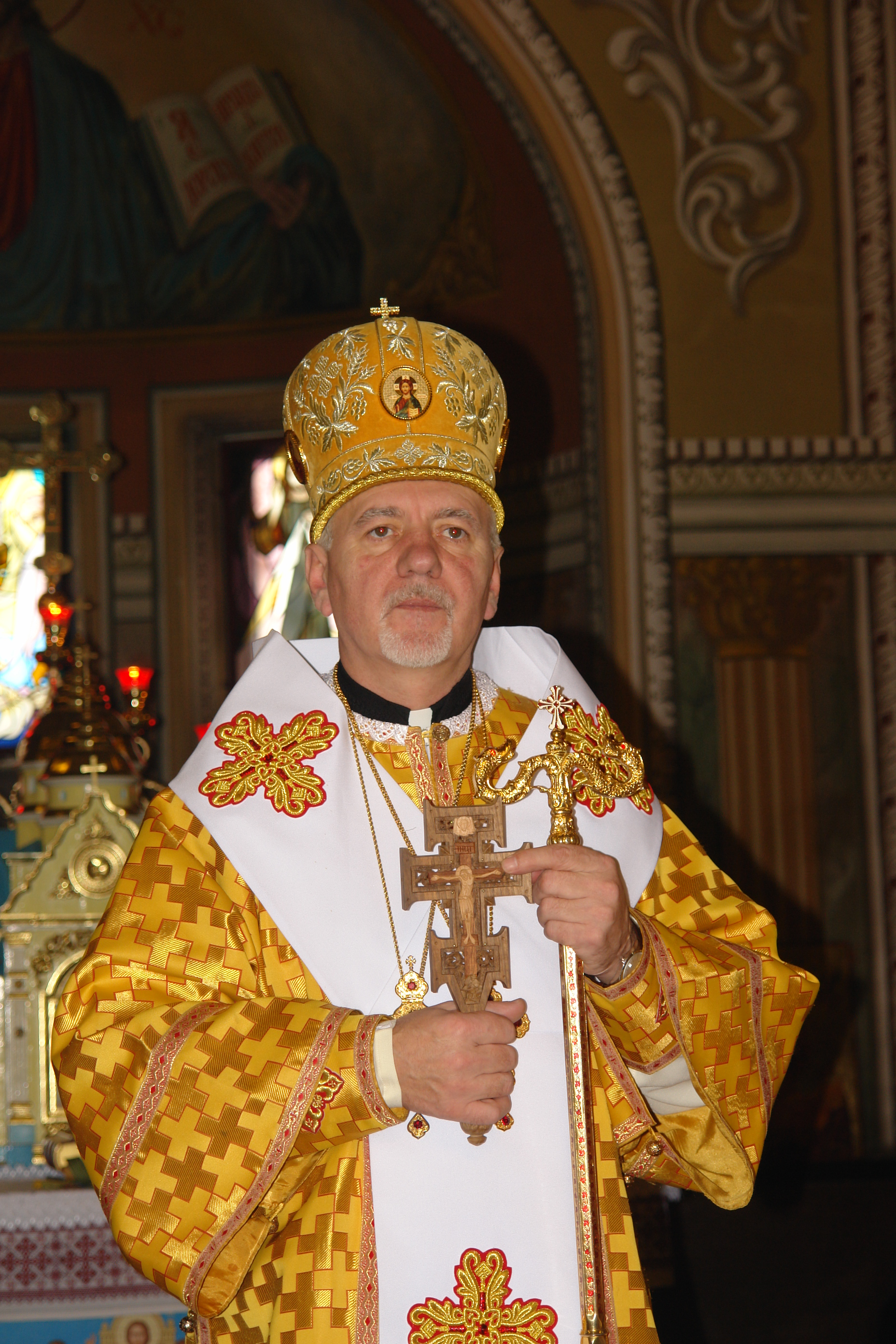
- Church: Ukrainian Greek Catholic Church
- Elected: 2 June 2005 (as Eparchial Bishop); 21 November 2011 (as Metropolitan)
- Predecessor: Sofron Dmyterko
- Other post(s): Coadjutor Bishop of Kolomyia-Chernivtsi (2003–2004); Bishop of Kolomyia-Chernivtsi (2004–2005) Order of Merit (3rd class)

Orders
- Ordination: 26 May 1982 (Priest) by Pavlo Vasylyk
- Consecration: 15 Jul 2003 (Bishop) by Lubomyr Husar

Personal details
- Born: Volodymyr Ivanovych Viytyshyn; 9 November 1959 (age 65); Demydivka, Zhmerynka Raion, Vinnytsia Oblast, Ukrainian SSR

Archbishop Volodymyr Viytyshyn (Ukrainian: Володимир Війтишин; born 9 November 1959) is a Ukrainian Greek Catholic hierarch as an archbishop-metropolitan of Ukrainian Catholic Archeparchy of Ivano-Frankivsk since 2 June 2005 (until 21 November 2011 in rank of Eparchial Bishop). Previously he served as a Coadjutor Bishop of Kolomyia-Chernivtsi from 13 May 2003 until 12 December 2004 and as an Eparchial Bishop of the same Kolomyia-Chernivtsi from 12 December 2004 until 2 June 2005.

Coat of arms of Volodymyr Viytishy

== Life ==
Archbishop Viytyshyn was born in the family of clandestine Greek-Catholics in Vinnytsia Oblast, but in early childhood moved with parents to the Ternopil Oblast, where he grew up. After graduation of the school education he made a compulsory service in the Soviet Army.

In this time he was clandestinely ordained as priest by Bishop Pavlo Vasylyk on May 26, 1982, after he completed clandestine theological studies and made a pastoral work among faithful of the "Catacomb Church". Fr. Viytyshyn was among these persons, who on 4 August 1987 made a declaration about exit from clandestinity of the Ukrainian Greek Catholic Church. From 1990 until 1997 he served as Dean of Tlumach Deanery and from 1997 until 2003 as an Econom of the Eparchy of Kolomyia-Chernivtsi. At the same time he continued his theological studies in the Theological Seminary in Ivano-Frankivsk and Catholic University of Lublin in Poland.

On May 13, 2003 Fr. Viytyshyn was elected and on July 15, 2003 was consecrated to the Episcopate as the Coadjutor Bishop of the Ukrainian Catholic Eparchy of Kolomyia-Chernivtsi. The principal consecrator was Cardinal Lubomyr Husar, the Head of the Ukrainian Greek Catholic Church.

Catholic Church titles
Preceded by nobody	Coadjutor Bishop of Kolomyia-Chernivtsi; 2003–2004	Succeeded by nobody
Preceded by Pavlo Vasylyk	Bishop of Kolomyia-Chernivtsi; 2004–2005	Succeeded by Mykola Simkaylo
Preceded by Sofron Mudry	Archbishop of Ivano-Frankivsk^{(until 2011 as Bishop of Ivano-Frankivsk)} 2005–present	Succeeded by Incumbent
