= Nicholas Charnetsky =

Ukrainian Byzantine Catholic bishop (1884–1959)

Blessed Nicholas Charnetsky CSsR
- Bishop Nicholas Charnetsky

Bishop and Martyr
- Born: December 14, 1884; Semakivtsi, Kolomyia Raion, Ukraine
- Died: April 2, 1959; Ukraine
- Venerated in: Catholic Church
- Beatified: 27 June 2001, Lviv, Ukraine by Pope John Paul II
- Feast: 2 April

Nicholas Charnetsky, Mykolai Charnetskyi or Mykolay Charnetsky (Ukrainian: Миколай Чарнецький; December 14, 1884 – April 2, 1959) also known as Nicholas of Volyn (Ukrainian: Миколай Волинський) was a member of the Redemptorists (Congregation of the Most Holy Redeemer), a religious congregation in the Byzantine Rite of the Catholic Church; he is considered a martyr by the Church.

== Family background ==
Mykolai Charnetskyi was born in the village of Semakivtsia, a hamlet in Kolomyia Raion in western Ukraine, on 14 December 1884. He came from a large family and was the eldest of nine children. Alexander and Parasceva Charnetsky and their children were devout members of the Ukrainian Greek Catholic Church which is in communion with the Bishop of Rome and is distinct from the Ukrainian Orthodox Church.

== Ukrainian seminary and priesthood ==
From a young age, Charnetsky had expressed a desire to become a priest and when he was 18 years of age, the Ukrainian Catholic Bishop Hryhory Khomyshyn (who was himself to be martyred) sent him to study at the Ukrainian College in Rome. In Rome, he was known for his love of the Eastern Fathers and tradition. After his ordination to the Catholic priesthood in 1909, Charnetsky returned from Ukraine to Rome so that he might complete a Doctorate in Theology, which he did the following year.

Upon completion of his doctorate, Charnetsky returned to his homeland in order to teach dogmatic theology and philosophy at the Ukrainian Catholic seminary in Ivano-Frankivsk (then called Stanislaviv) where he remained for the next nine years, also serving as spiritual director to any student who wished.

== Ministry as a Redemptorist ==
For some time, Charnetsky had desired to live a more austere life than that of a seminary professor. In 1913, the Belgian province of the Redemptorists had established a mission in Ukraine and this included a novitiate near Lviv for those interested in joining the congregation. Like Ivan Ziatyk who was to follow him some years later, Charnetsky entered the novitiate in 1919.

As he was already an ordained priest, after his first profession in 1920, Charnetsky immediately began working in a nearby parish before being sent to teach at the minor seminary (for students in their teens) run by the Redemptorists.

However, in 1926 the congregation opened a mission in the Volhynia region of northern Ukraine (then part of Poland), the main purpose of which was to promote a better relationship between Catholic and Orthodox Ukrainians. As Charnetsky had been ordained in the Ukrainian Catholic Rite, he was well acquainted with the liturgy and Christian spirituality as lived by those of the Orthodox churches and this gained him much respect amongst their people and clergy. His devotion to the people together with his tireless efforts at fostering Orthodox-Catholic relations caused Pope Pius XII to name him as titular bishop of Lebed and Apostolic Visitor to Ukrainian Catholics in the Volhynia region as well as those in Podlaskie (Ukr: Pidlashia) in southern Poland. He was ordained to the episcopacy by Bishop Hryhoriy Khomyshyn in Rome on February 2, 1931. From 1931 to 1939, he ministered to the people of Volyn, Polisia, Pidliasia, and Belorussia.

Charnetsky was invited by Irish Redemptorists to the 1932 Eucharistic Congress. He lodged for a fortnight in the guest-house of the Redemptoristine monastery on Saint Alphonsus Road and offered the Divine Liturgy in the monastery church each morning. On the second day of the Eucharistic Congress, Charnetsky celebrated a Pontifical Divine Liturgy for all the Congress participants in the Jesuit Church on Gardiner Street; an icon-screen with hand-painted icons was especially made and installed for this purpose; it is not known what became of the screen. A choir directed by Paul Mailleux (later Rector of the Pontifical Russian College in Rome) sang the Pontifical Liturgy in Church-Slavonic. Fulton J. Sheen of the United States was among the participating clergy.

After the Eucharistic Congress, Charnetsky remained in Ireland for several weeks, visiting various Redemptorist churches and schools. He then went back to Poland. Unfortunately, Charnetsky never had an opportunity to return to Ireland; World War II and the Soviet persecution of the church severely restricted his activity.

== Soviet invasion and imprisonment ==
In 1939 Soviet armed forces invaded western Ukraine, causing the Redemptorists to flee to Lviv. Two years later, Charnetsky took up a professorship at Lviv Theological Academy (now the Ukrainian Catholic University) which was revived in 1941, after Nazi Germany occupied the city.

In 1944 the Soviets invaded for a second time and the following year all the Ukrainian Greek Catholic bishops were placed under arrest as part of the Soviet plan to suppress the church and transfer its property to the state-sanctioned Russian Orthodox Church. During his time in prison Charnetsky endured frequent violent interrogations. Charnetsky was arrested on April 11, 1945. He was charged with collaborating with and being an agent of a foreign power i.e. the Vatican; as a result he was sentenced to hard labour.

Initially, one of his prison compatriots was the noted Cardinal Josyf Slipyj when both were imprisoned in Mariinsk, southern Siberia. Between his arrest in 1945 and his release eleven years later, Charnetsky was moved around to about thirty a prisons. It was reported that, during all this time, he maintained a dignified, gentle and calming presence in spite of enduring over 600 hours of interrogation, which included torture.

== Release and death ==
By 1956, Charnetsky's health was in such a dismal state that a shroud had already been prepared; the prison authorities then decided to release him in order that he die elsewhere. However, he made enough of a surprising partial recovery that he was able to pastor the Ukrainian Catholic community, which was then operating clandestinely. Although he lived under constant surveillance, one of his most important acts was to secretly prepare and ordain young men called to the priesthood.

On 2 April 1959 Charnetsky died and was buried in Lviv two days later. Due to many regarding him as a saint, people began visit his grave and to ask for his heavenly intercession immediately. Today people continue to claim that miracles happen through his intercession. On 23 April 2001 Charnetsky's martyrdom was verified by the assembly of Cardinals. He was beatified by Pope John Paul II during his pastoral visit to Ukraine on 27 June 2001. This date was significant as it is the feast of Our Lady of Perpetual Help, the patroness of the Redemptorists.

== Testimony of Vasyl Voronovskyi ==
“I saw him. He was a very humble person. The first time I came for instruction from the bishop, he was sweeping the house. I wanted to help him, to take the broom, but he didn’t let me. He himself swept. ‘Have a seat,’ he said. I was embarrassed that the bishop was sweeping, but I was sitting, because he wouldn’t let me. He told how many priests who had signed over to Orthodoxy, came to him to confess nearly 300 priests, they repented and came to him.” – From an interview with Father Vasyl Voronovskyi.
