= Ivan Slezyuk =

Ukrainian Catholic beatified bishop

Blessed Ivan Slezyuk
- Born: 14 January 1896; Żywaczów, Austrian Galicia, Austria-Hungary (now Zhyvachiv, Ukraine)
- Died: 2 December 1973 (aged 77); Ivano-Frankivsk, Ukrainian SSR, Soviet Union
- Venerated in: Roman Catholic Church, Ukrainian Catholic Church
- Beatified: 27 June 2001, Lviv, Ukraine by Pope John Paul II
- Feast: 28 June

Ivan Slezyuk (Ukrainian: Іван Слезюк, Polish: Iwan Słeziuk; 14 January 1896 – 2 December 1973) was a Ukrainian Greek Catholic bishop and hieromartyr.

== Life ==
Slezyuk was born on 14 January 1896 in the village of Zhyvachiv, Austrian-Hungarian Empire (now in Ivano-Frankivsk Oblast, Ukraine). After graduating from the seminary in 1923, he was ordained a priest on 1923 by Bishop Hryhoriy Khomyshyn.

In April 1945, Khomyshyn consecrated him to the Episcopate as his coadjutor with the right of succession as a precaution in case Khomyshyn should be arrested. However, shortly thereafter on 2 June 1945, Slezyuk was arrested and deported for ten years to the labour camps in Vorkuta. In 1950, he was transferred to the labour camps in Mordovia. After his release on 15 November 1954, he returned to Stanislaviv. In 1962, he was arrested for the second time and imprisoned for five years in a camp of strict regimen. After his release on 30 November 1968, he had to go to the KGB for regular "talks." The last visit was two weeks before his death.

He died on 2 December 1973 in Ivano-Frankivsk.

== Testimony of Bishop Sofron Dmyterko ==
"As the deceased himself said, they locked him in a separate isolated area, and no one visited him. He stayed there for two hours. Then they told him: 'You're free to go.' It was difficult for him to walk because, as he himself said, after this he felt dizzy, as if he had a fever, his skin was burning. The Sisters of St. Vincent, who helped him out, also said that the bishop returned from this 'conversation' with a very red face, he felt exhausted, stayed in bed and died two weeks later. There was and still is a suspicion that the KGB used radiation to get rid of one more Uniate bishop." – From the testimony of Bishop Sofron Dmyterko.
