= Vasyl Ivasyuk =

Ukrainian-Greek Catholic hierarch (born 1960)

- Eparchial Bishop of Ukrainian Catholic Eparchy of Kolomyia
- Church: Ukrainian Greek Catholic Church
- Appointed: 25 May 2013 (as Apchiepiscopal Administrator); 13 February 2014 (as Bishop)
- Predecessor: Mykola Simkaylo
- Successor: Incumbent
- Other posts: Ukrainian Catholic Archiepiscopal Exarch of Odesa-Krym (2003–2014); Titular Bishop of Benda (2003–2014)

Orders
- Ordination: 16 August 1989 (Priest) by Yulian Voronovskyi
- Consecration: 28 September 2003 (Bishop) by Lubomyr Husar

Personal details
- Born: Vasyl Ivasyuk; 21 January 1960 (age 66) Dora, Stanislav Oblast, Ukrainian SSR (present day Yaremche, Ivano-Frankivsk Oblast, Ukraine)

Bishop Vasyl Ivasyuk (Ukrainian: Василь Івасюк; born 21 January 1960 in Dora, Stanislav Oblast, Ukrainian SSR /present day Yaremche, Ivano-Frankivsk Oblast, Ukraine/) is a Ukrainian Greek Catholic hierarch as an Eparchial Bishop of Ukrainian Catholic Eparchy of Kolomyia since 13 February 2014 (until 12 September 2017 with title of Kolomyia – Chernivtsi). Previously he served as an Archiepiscopal Exarch of Odesa-Krym from 28 July 2003 until 13 February 2014 and as an Archiepiscopal Administrator of the Kolomyia – Chernivtsi from 25 May 2013 until 13 February 2014 as a Titular Bishop of Benda.

Coat of arms of Bishop Vasyl Ivasyuk

== Life ==
Bishop Ivasyuk was born in a family of clandestine Greek-Catholics in the Western Ukraine. He joined a clandestine theological seminary, while studying in the Melioration Institute in Rivne.

He was ordained a priest on 16 August 1989 and worked as pastor among the faithful of the "Catacomb Church". Then Ivasyuk continued his theological studies in the Theological Seminary in Ternopil and in the Pontifical Gregorian University in Rome, obtaining a licentiate degree in dogmatic theology. At the same time, from 1989 until 1990 he served as parish priest in Stare Misto and Pidhaitsi and from 1990 until 1993 as a parish priest and Dean of Berezhany Deanery. Later he served a Protosynkellos of the Ukrainian Catholic Eparchy of Zboriv and after returning from his studies in Rome, as a Protosynkellos of the Ukrainian Catholic Eparchy of Sokal.

On 28 July 2003 Fr. Ivasyuk was appointed and on 28 September 2003 was consecrated to the episcopate as the first Archiepiscopal Exarch of Odesa-Krym. The principal consecrator was Cardinal Lubomyr Husar, the head of the Ukrainian Greek Catholic Church.

Catholic Church titles
Preceded by Tomasz Peta	Titular Bishop of Benda; 2003–2014	Succeeded by Wilhelm Zimmermann
New title	Archiepiscopal Exarch of Odesa-Krym; 2003–2014	Succeeded by Mykhaylo Bubniy (as Archiepiscopal Exarch of Odesa)
Preceded by Mykola Simkaylo	Archiepiscopal Administrator of Kolomyia – Chernivtsi; 2013–2014	Succeeded by himself as Eparchial Bishop
Preceded by himself as Archiepiscopal Administrator	Eparchial Bishop of Kolomyia (until 2017 as Eparchial Bishop of Kolomyia–Chernivtsi); 2014–present	Incumbent
