= Sofron Mudry =

Ukrainian Catholic bishop

Sofron Stefan Mudry, O.S.B.M
- Bishop of Ukrainian Catholic Eparchy of Ivano-Frankivsk (emeritus)
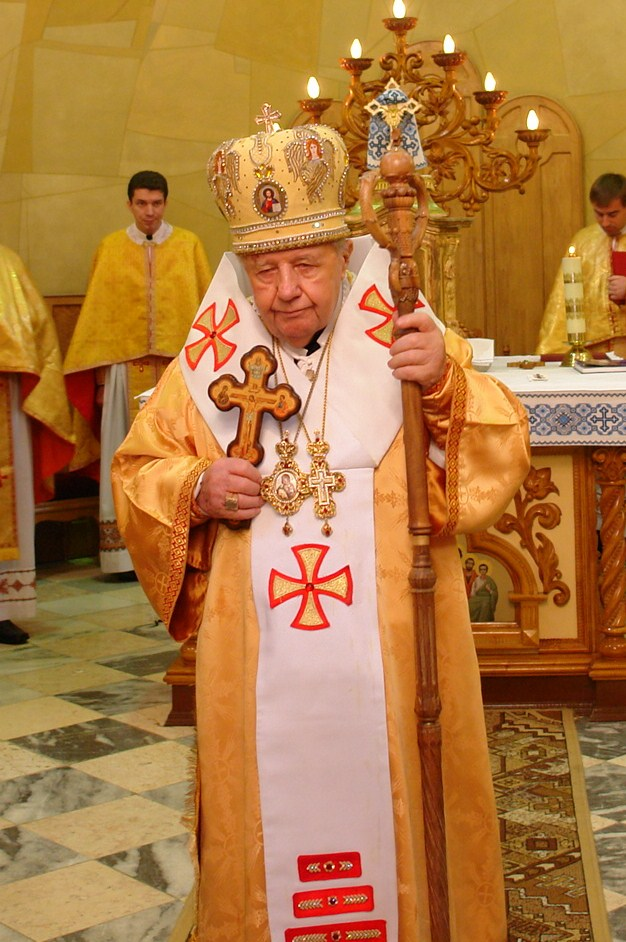
- Church: Ukrainian Catholic Church
- See: Ukrainian Catholic Eparchy of Ivano-Frankivsk
- In office: 1997–2005
- Predecessor: Sofron Dmyterko
- Successor: Volodymyr Viytyshyn
- Previous post: prelate

Orders
- Ordination: 25 December 1958

Personal details
- Born: 27 November 1923 Złoczów, Poland (now Zolochiv, Ukraine)
- Died: October 31, 2014 (aged 90) Ivano-Frankivsk, Ukraine

Sofron O.S.B.M (27 November 1923 – 31 October 2014) was a

Sofron Stefan Mudry was born in Zolochiv, Poland, was ordained a priest in the Religious Order of Saint Basil the Great on 25 December 1958. He was elected the Coadjutor bishop to the Ukrainian Catholic Eparchy of Ivano-Frankivsk on 2 March 1996 and ordained a bishop on 12 May 1996. Elected bishop to the Ukrainian Catholic Eparchy of Ivano-Frankivsk on 7 November 1997 and would remain in the post until his retirement on 2 June 2005.

== See also ==
- Ukrainian Catholic Eparchy of Ivano-Frankivsk
- Ukrainian Greek Catholic Church
