= Sofron Dmyterko =

Ukrainian bishop (1917–2008)

Sofron Dmyterko, O.S.B.M.
- Bishop of Ukrainian Catholic Eparchy of Ivano-Frankivsk
- Church: Ukrainian Greek Catholic Church
- See: Ukrainian Catholic Eparchy of Ivano-Frankivsk
- In office: 1991–1997
- Predecessor: Bl. Ivan Sleziuk
- Successor: Sofron Stefan Mudry,
- Previous post: Priest

Orders
- Ordination: 14 May 1942

Personal details
- Born: 1 June 1917 Bychkivtsi, Ukraine
- Died: 5 November 2008 (aged 91)

Sofron Dmyterko O.S.B.M. (1 June 1917 – 5 November 2008) was a Ukrainian Bishop of the Ukrainian Greek Catholic Church.

Dmyterko was born in Bychkivtsi, Ukraine, ordained a priest in the Religious Order of Saint Basil the Great on 14 May 1942 and ordained a bishop on 30 November 1968. He was confirmed to the Ukrainian Catholic Eparchy of Ivano-Frankivsk on 16 January 1991 and retired on 7 November 1997.

== See also ==
- Ukrainian Greek Catholic Church
