= Hryhoriy Khomyshyn =

Ukrainian bishop (1867–1947)

Blessed Hryhoriy Khomyshyn
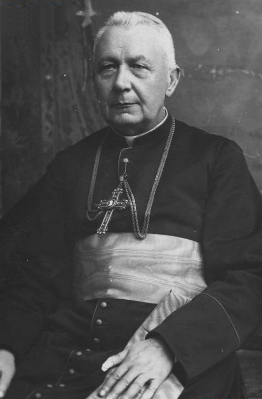
- Khomyshyn, c. 1933
- Born: 25 March 1867; Hadynkivtsi, Husiatyn, Kingdom of Galicia and Lodomeria, Austrian Empire
- Died: 17 January 1947 (aged 79) (Note: Khomyshyn's exact date of death is disputed even in official sources, due to the unknown circumstances of his burial. The Synod of the Ukrainian Catholic Church recognizes it as 28 December 1945, citing NKVD medical reports, and the Dicastery for the Causes of Saints uses this day as his feast day.); Lukyanivska Prison; Kyiv, Ukrainian SSR, Soviet Union
- Cause of death: torture
- Venerated in: Roman Catholic Church, Ukrainian Catholic Church
- Beatified: 27 June 2001, Lviv, Ukraine by Pope John Paul II
- Feast: December 28

Hryhoriy Khomyshyn (also Hryhorij Khomyshyn, Ukrainian: Григорій Лукич Хомишин, Polish: Grzegorz Chomyszyn, Italian: Hryhoryj Chomyšyn, Gregorio Khomyšyn) was a Ukrainian Greek Catholic bishop and hieromartyr.

== Biography ==
Khomyshyn was born to a peasant family on 25 March 1867 in the village of Hadynkivtsi, eastern Galicia, in what is now Ternopil Oblast. He graduated from Lviv seminary and was ordained a priest on 18 November 1893. He continued to study theology at the University of Vienna from 1894 to 1899, and in 1902, Metropolitan Andrey Sheptytsky appointed Khomyshyn the rector of the Greek Catholic Theological Seminary in Lviv. In 1904, he was consecrated as the bishop for Stanyslaviv (now Ivano-Frankivsk) at St. George's Cathedral, taking the episcopal motto "Подъ твою милость" (Church Slavonic for "Beneath thy mercy"). Throughout his tenure, spanning over four decades, he was considered the second most powerful figure in the Ukrainian Greek Catholic Church.

Unlike Sheptytsky, Khomyshyn believed that the UGCC should adopt a more westward orientation, further emphasizing the Uniate Church's relationship with Rome. This meant introducing Latinized practicies such as the Gregorian calendar and a strict adherence to clerical celibacy, which were met with controversy in his eparchy.

During the 1930s, Khomyshyn was responsible for organizing the Ukrainian Catholic People's Party, which briefly held seats in the Sejm and Senate. A Christian democrat, he is noted as being one of only a handful of members of the Catholic hierarchy in interwar Poland to publicly oppose anti-Semitism; his tolerance towards Galician Jews likely owing to his own experience as part of Poland's Ukrainian minority. As a result of his moderate approach to Ukrainian nationalism, he would be labeled a "sellout" by the OUN and was left fearing for his life.

== Arrest and martyrdom ==
Khomyshyn was first arrested in 1939 by the NKVD. A critic of the Soviet system, having called the occupying forces "fierce beasts animated by ... the devil," he was arrested again in April 1945, and was then deported to Kyiv. In prison, he was tortured and advised to renounce the Union of Brest, which he refused to do.

Khomyshyn died in the Lukyanivska Prison hospital in Kyiv on 17 January 1947. He was beatified by Pope John Paul II on 27 June 2001, as one of Mykolai Charnets'kyi and the 24 companion martyrs. The sesquicentennial of his birth in 2017 was marked by celebrations in both Ukraine and Poland, along with examinations of the bishop's social impact in academic circles.

== Quote ==
"At the Kyiv prison, the interrogations were conducted by Interrogator Dubok. He was a horrible sadist. He investigated my case... This Dubok told me himself how he had killed the bishop: 'So you, Khomyshyn, spoke out against communism?' The bishop, as always, replied resolutely: 'I did and I will.' Did you fight against Soviet authority?' 'Yes, I did and I will!' Then Dubok became outraged and grabbed some books written by the bishop, which lay on the table in front of him, and started cruelly beating His Excellency with them, on his head and everywhere else." - From the testimony of Father Petro Heryliuk-Kupchynysky.

== Notes ==
Catholic Church titles
Preceded by Andrey Sheptytsky	Eparch of Stanislaviv; 1904-1947	Succeeded by Ivan Slezyuk
