= Carlo Chiarlo =

Italian cardinal (1881–1964)

His Eminence Carlo Chiarlo
- Cardinal-Priest of Santa Maria in Campitelli "pro hac vice"
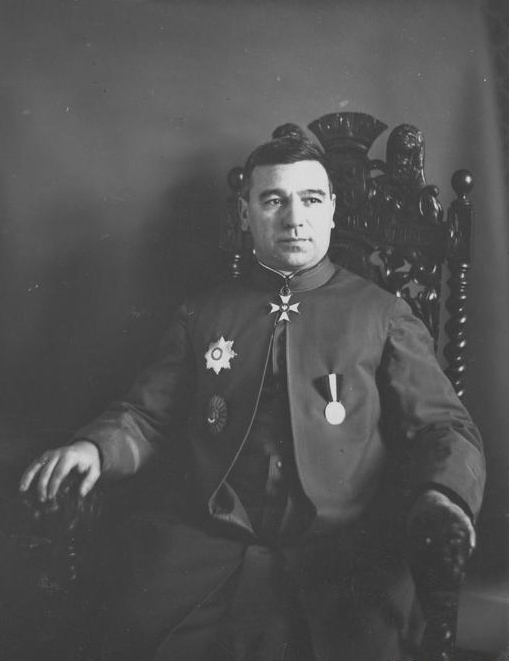
- Portrait.
- Church: Roman Catholic Church
- Appointed: 18 December 1958
- Term ended: 21 January 1964
- Predecessor: Massimo Massimi
- Successor: Charles Journet
- Previous posts: Titular Archbishop of Amida (1928–58); Apostolic Nuncio to Bolivia (1928–32); Apostolic Internuncio to Central America (1932–33); Apostolic Nuncio to Costa Rica (1933–41); Apostolic Nuncio to Nicaragua (1938–41); Apostolic Nuncio to Panama (1938–41); Apostolic Nuncio to Brazil (1946–54)

Orders
- Ordination: 28 May 1904
- Consecration: 11 November 1928 by Pietro Gasparri
- Created cardinal: 15 December 1958 by Pope John XXIII
- Rank: Cardinal-Priest

Personal details
- Born: Carlo Chiarlo; 4 November 1881 Pontremoli, Tuscany, Kingdom of Italy
- Died: 21 January 1964 (aged 82) Lucca, Italy
- Education: Pontifical University of Saint Thomas Aquinas
- Motto: Latin: Mea Lux Dominus
- Coat of arms: Carlo Chiarlo's coat of arms

Styles of Carlo Chiarlo
- Reference style: His Eminence
- Spoken style: Your Eminence
- Informal style: Cardinal
- See: none

Carlo Chiarlo (4 November 1881 – 21 January 1964) was an Italian cardinal of the Roman Catholic Church. He served as nuncio to several countries, mostly Latin American, and was elevated to the cardinalate in 1958.

== Biography ==
Born in Pontremoli, Chiarlo studied at the seminary in Lucca and the Pontifical University of St. Thomas Aquinas (Angelicum) in Rome before being ordained to the priesthood on 28 May 1904. He then taught at the seminary and did pastoral work in Lucca until 1917. Chiarlo was secretary and later chargé d'affaires of the nunciature to Peru from 1917 to 1922, when he was named Auditor of the Polish nunciature.

He was raised to the rank of Privy Chamberlain of His Holiness on 26 May 1918 while secretary in Peru.

On 12 October 1928, Chiarlo was appointed Titular Archbishop of Amida by Pope Pius XI. He received his episcopal consecration on the following 12 November from Cardinal Pietro Gasparri, with Archbishop Giovanni Volpi and Bishop Theodor Kubina serving as co-consecrators, in the chapel of the Collegio Pio-Latinoamericano in Rome. He was named Nuncio to Bolivia on 12 November. (Note: The Acta Apostolicae Sedis identifies him as Nuncio to Bolivia on 12 October and describes his appointment to that office on 12 November.)

On 28 January 1932, Chiarlo was made Apostolic Internuncio to Central America, with responsibility as Nuncio to Costa Rica, Honduras, Nicaragua, El Salvador, and Panama, as well as Apostolic Delegate to Guatemala. His role was then modified on 30 September 1933 with the erection of nunciatures, leaving him Apostolic Nuncio to Costa Rica, Nicaragua, and Panama, with his role as Nuncio to El Salvador and Honduras and Delegate to Guatemala assigned to Albert Levame later that year.

Returning to Rome, he was charged with the special mission of assisting prisoners of World War II on 3 December 1941. He was named head of the pontifical mission to Germany in 1945.

He was appointed Nuncio to Brazil, where he would be a beloved figure, on 19 March 1946. He was replaced in Brazil by Armando Lombardi on 22 September 1954 and remained a nuncio at the disposition of the Secretariat of State.

Pope John XXIII created him cardinal-priest of S. Maria in Portico in the consistory of 15 December 1958. Cardinal Chiarlo lived long enough to attend only the first two sessions of the Second Vatican Council from 1962 to 1963, and serve as a cardinal elector in the 1963 papal conclave that selected Pope Paul VI.

He died in Lucca at age 82 and is buried in an urban cemetery there.

== Notes ==
Catholic Church titles
Preceded by John Baptist Pitaval	— TITULAR — Archbishop of Amida; 1928–1958	Succeeded by Gastone Mojaisky Perrelli
Preceded by Massimo Massimi	Cardinal-priest of Santa Maria in Campitelli; 1958–1964	Succeeded by Charles Journet
Diplomatic posts
Preceded by Tito Trocchi	Apostolic Nuncio to Bolivia; 1928–1932	Succeeded by Luigi Centoz
Preceded by Giovanni Battista Marenco	Apostolic Delegate to Guatemala; 1932–1933	Succeeded by Albert Levame
Preceded by Giuseppe Fietta	Apostolic Internuncio to Central America; 1932–1933	Succeeded by vacant
Preceded by vacant	Apostolic Nuncio to Costa Rica; 1933–1941	Succeeded by Luigi Centoz
Preceded by vacant	Apostolic Nuncio to Nicaragua; 1933–1941	Succeeded by Luigi Centoz
Preceded by vacant	Apostolic Nuncio to Panama; 1933–1941	Succeeded by Luigi Centoz
Preceded by Benedetto Aloisi Masella	Apostolic Nuncio to Brazil; 1946–1954	Succeeded by Armando Lombardi
