= Federico Lunardi =

Italian prelate

- Apostolic Nuncio to Paraguay
- Church: Catholic Church
- In office: 8 July 1949 – 9 November 1954
- Predecessor: Liberato Tosti
- Successor: Luigi Punzolo
- Other post: Titular Archbishop of Side (1936-1954)
- Previous posts: Official of the Secretariat of State (1947-1949); Apostolic Nuncio to Honduras (1938-1947); Apostolic Nuncio to Bolivia (1936-1938)

Orders
- Ordination: 30 March 1907
- Consecration: 16 November 1936 by Benedetto Aloisi Masella

Personal details
- Born: 7 December 1880 Livorno, Kingdom of Italy
- Died: 9 November 1954 (aged 73) Asunción, Paraguay

Federico Lunardi (7 December 1880 – 9 November 1954) was an Italian prelate of the Catholic Church who spent most of his career in the diplomatic service of the Holy See, serving also in the Roman Curia.

== Biography ==
Federico Lunardi was born in Livorno, Italy, on November 7, 1880. At the age of sixteen, he began the seminary in Livorno. In 1897 he moved to Rome to continue his studies and it was there that, in 1903 he graduated in philosophy, theology and in Utroque Iure.

He was ordained a priest on 30 March 1907, and later became the assistant of the bishop of Livorno. In 1916 he started his diplomatic career when he was put in charge of the Apostolic nunciature of Havana, a position which he kept until 1920.

After Cuba, he spent three year in Chile, and later in Columbia (1923-1931). During these years, he often visited San Agustìn, conducting researches and studies in the archeological site.

After Columbia he was moved to Brasil (1931-1936), where he dedicated himself on ethnological studies. In Brasil, Lunardi arrives at the peak of his career when, on November 15, 1936, Pope Pius XI names him Apostolic Nuncio and titular archbishop of Side..

In Bolivia (1936-1938), he studied and researched the city of Tiahuanaco and collected many archeological finds, which are now in the Lunardi Collections.

At the beginning of 1939, he is relocated in Honduras, where he stays until 1948. In Honduras he travels and often stops at Copàn, a maya cultural site, where he takes part in conferences and collects archeological finds.

In 1948, he goes back to Rome, where he is assigned to the Secretariat of State, however only an year later he leaves for Asunción, in Paraguay (1949-1954).

On November 11, 1954, at the age of 73, he died in Asunción. His remains will then be buried in the cemetery of Misericordia, in Livorno.
