= Francesco Borgongini Duca =

Italian cardinal

His Eminence Francesco Borgongini Duca
- Pontifical Administrator for the Basilica di San Paolo fuori le mura
- Church: Roman Catholic Church
- Appointed: 1 April 1933
- Term ended: 4 October 1954
- Successor: Marcello Costalunga
- Other posts: Pontifical Delegate for the Shrine of Loreto (1934–54); Cardinal-Priest of Santa Maria in Vallicella (1953–54)
- Previous posts: Pro-Secretary of the Congregation for Extraordinary Ecclesiastical Affairs (1921–22); Secretary of the Congregation for Extraordinary Ecclesiastical Affairs (1922–29); Apostolic Nuncio to Italy (1929–53)

Orders
- Ordination: 22 December 1906
- Consecration: 29 June 1929 by Pietro Gasparri
- Created cardinal: 12 January 1953 by Pope Pius XII
- Rank: Cardinal-priest

Personal details
- Born: Francesco Borgongini Duca; 26 February 1884 Rome, Kingdom of Italy
- Died: 4 October 1954 (aged 70) Palace of the Holy Office, Rome, Italy
- Buried: Campo Verano (first); San Salvatore in Ossibus (current)
- Parents: Giovanni Borgongini Duca; Rosa Scalzi
- Education: Pontifical Roman Seminary
- Motto: Cana fides
- Coat of arms

Styles of Francesco Borgongini Duca
- Reference style: His Eminence
- Spoken style: Your Eminence
- Religious style: Monsignor
- Informal style: Cardinal

Francesco Borgongini Duca (26 February 1884 – 4 October 1954) was an Italian cardinal of the Catholic Church who served as Apostolic Nuncio to Italy from 1929 to 1953 and was made a cardinal in 1953 by Pope Pius XII.

== Biography ==
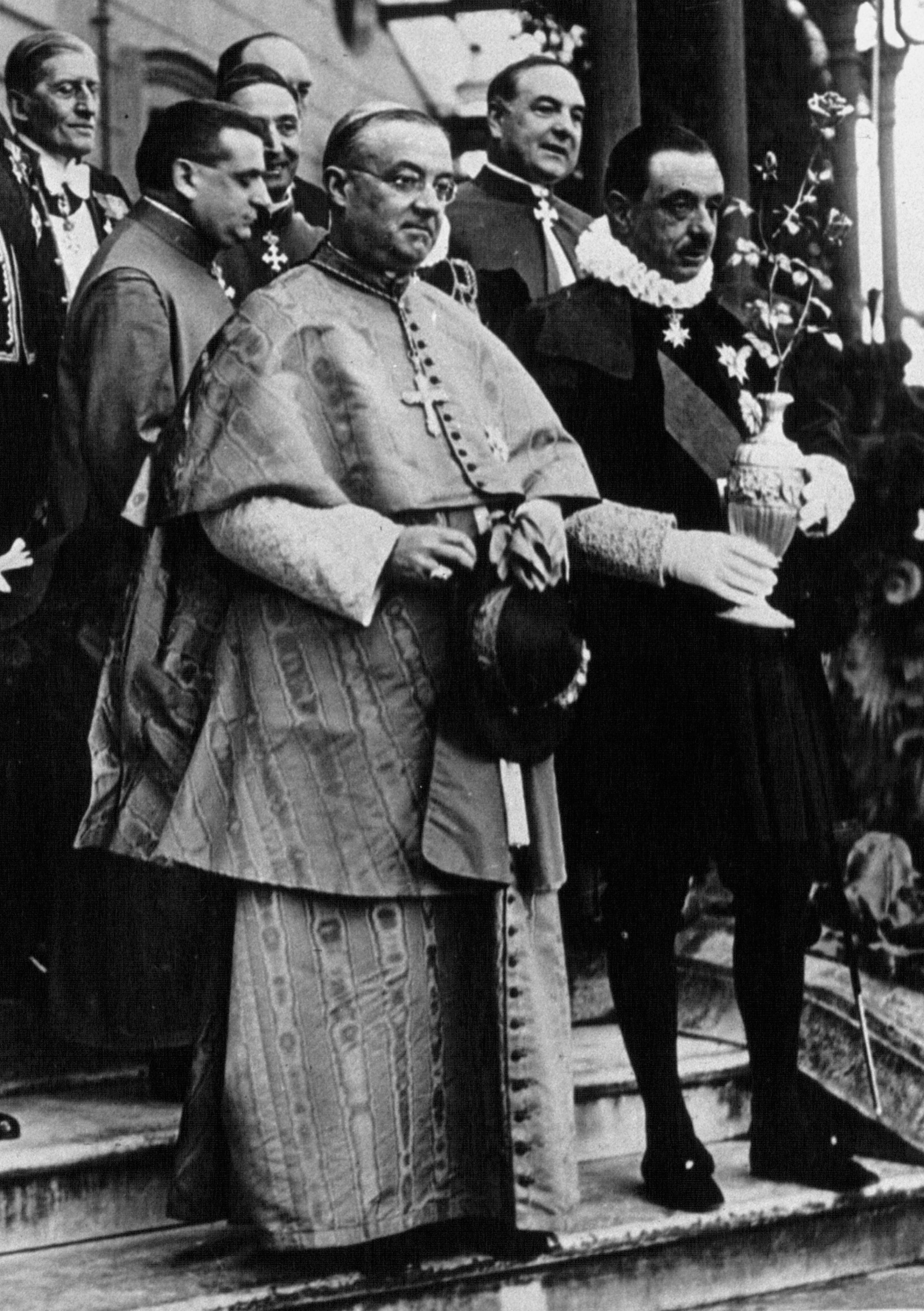
Borgongini Duca in 1937

Borgongini Duca was born in Rome, and studied at the Pontifical Roman Seminary, from where he obtained doctorates in theology and in canon and civil law. He was ordained to the priesthood on 22 December 1906, and then taught theology at both the Pontifical North American College and the Pontifical Urbanian Athenaeum De Propaganda Fide from 1907 to 1909. He was favorably impressed by a young American seminarian named Francis Spellman, whom Duca would later assist in consecrating as Auxiliary Bishop of Boston in 1932.

Borgongini Duca entered the service of the Roman Curia upon being made an official of the Apostolic Penitentiary in 1909, of which he became secretary on 24 February 1917. He was raised to the rank of privy chamberlain of his holiness on 2 March 1917, and was named pro-secretary of the Sacred Congregation for Extraordinary Ecclesiastical Affairs on 28 June 1921, rising to become full secretary on 14 October 1922 (the pope was the nominal head of that dicastery). He was made a domestic prelate of his holiness (7 July 1921) and apostolic protonotary (11 January 1927) before being named to the commission to negotiate the Lateran Treaty.

On 7 June 1929, he was appointed Titular Archbishop of Heraclea in Europa by Pope Pius XI. He received his episcopal consecration on the following 29 June from Cardinal Pietro Gasparri, with Archbishop Carlo Cremonesi and Bishop Agostino Zampini, OSA, serving as co-consecrators, in the Hall of Benedictions at St. Peter's Basilica. Duca was named Apostolic Nuncio to Italy, the first after the Lateran Treaty, the next day, on 30 June. In addition to his diplomatic duties, he was also made pontifical administrator of the Basilica of Saint Paul Outside the Walls on 1 April 1933, and of the Basilica of Our Lady of Loreto on 25 March 1934.

In early 1937, he bestowed the Golden Rose on Queen Elena of Italy, on the occasion of her fortieth wedding anniversary to Victor Emmanuel III. During World War II, Benito Mussolini clashed with Duca over the issue of restricting Jewish converts to Catholicism. In 1952, he wrote The Seventy Weeks of Daniel and the Messianic Date, in which he determined the date of the crucifixion of Jesus as 7 April 30 AD, by using the cryptographic prophecies contained in the Book of Daniel. Pope Pius XII created him Cardinal-Priest of Santa Maria in Vallicella in the consistory of 12 January 1953, ending his role as nuncio.

Duca died from a heart ailment at his apartment in the Palace of the Holy Office in Rome at age 70. He was initially buried in the chapel of the Congregation for the Propagation of the Faith, but his remains were later transferred to the church of San Salvatore in Ossibus in Vatican City.

Catholic Church titles
Preceded by New office	Apostolic Nuncio to Italy; 30 June 1929 – 12 January 1953	Succeeded by Giuseppe Fietta
