= Apostolic Nunciature to Argentina =

Diplomatic mission of the Holy See in Argentina

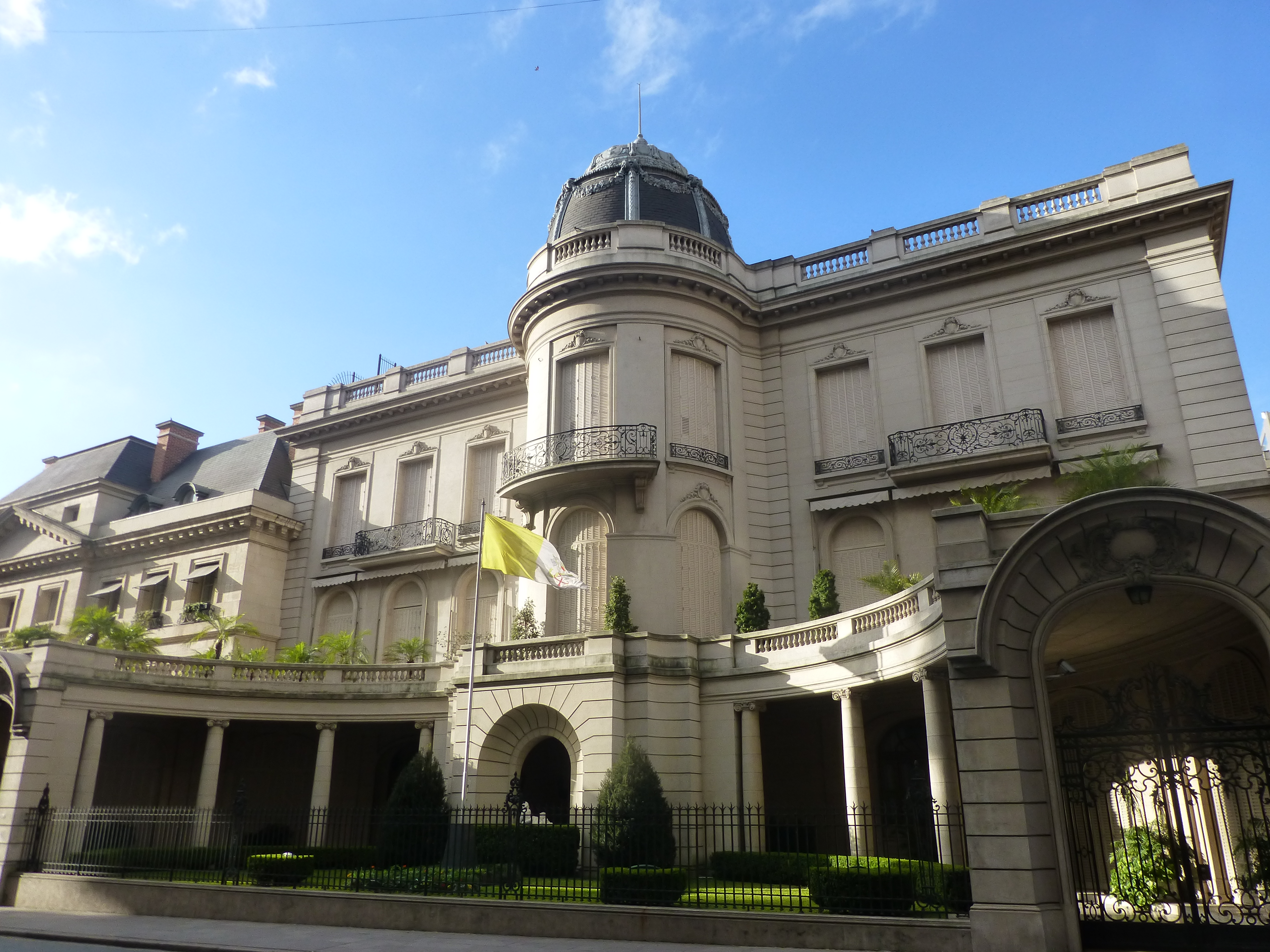
- Location: Buenos Aires
- Address: from 1949, Fernández Anchorena Palace, Av. Alvear 1637, Buenos Aires, Argentina
- Coordinates: 34°35′22.5″S 58°23′10.1″W

The Apostolic Nunciature to Argentina the diplomatic mission of the Holy See to Argentina. It is located at the Fernández Anchorena Palace, in Buenos Aires. The current Apostolic Nuncio is Archbishop Michael Banach, who was named to the position by Pope Leo XIV on May 14, 2026.

The Apostolic Nunciature to the Argentine Republic is an ecclesiastical office of the Catholic Church in Argentina, with the rank of an embassy. The nuncio serves both as the ambassador of the Holy See to the President of Argentina, and as delegate and point-of-contact between the Catholic hierarchy in Argentina and the Pope.

== Papal representatives to Argentina ==
Apostolic Delegates

- Lodovico Maria Besi (9 July 1850 – 26 May 1851)
- Lorenzo Barili (26 May 1851 – 17 June 1856)
- Vincenzo Massoni (26 September 1856 – 3 June 1857)
- Marino Marini (14 August 1857 – 27 March 1865)
- Angelo Di Pietro (31 December 1877 – 30 September 1879)
- Luigi Matera (19 September 1879 – 14 October 1884)

Apostolic Internuncios

- Antonio Sabatucci (24 April 1900 – 9 November 1906)
- Achille Locatelli (22 November 1906 – 8 July 1916)
- Alberto Vassallo-Torregrossa (2 May 1916 – 6 August 1920)
  - became nuncio on 5 July 1916

Apostolic Nuncios

- Beda Giovanni Cardinale, O.S.B. (25 July 1922 – 29 August 1925)
- Filippo Cortesi (19 October 1926 – 4 June 1936)
- Giuseppe Fietta (20 June 1936 – 26 January 1953)
- Mario Zanin (7 February 1953 – 4 August 1958)
- Umberto Mozzoni (20 September 1958 – 19 April 1969)
- Lino Zanini (7 May 1969 – 29 December 1973)
- Pio Laghi (27 April 1974 – 10 December 1980)
- Ubaldo Calabresi (23 January 1981 – 4 March 2000)
- Santos Abril y Castelló (4 March 2000 – 9 April 2003)
- Adriano Bernardini (26 April 2003 – 15 November 2011)
- Emil Paul Tscherrig (5 January 2012 – 12 September 2017)
- Léon Kalenga Badikebele (17 March 2018 – 12 June 2019)
- Mirosław Adamczyk (22 February 2020 – 14 January 2026)
- Michael Banach (14 May 2026 - present)

== See also ==
- Roman Catholicism in Argentina
- Religion in Argentina
