= Pirozzi =

Pirozzi is an Italian surname. Notable people with the surname include:

- Felice Pirozzi (1908–1975), Italian Catholic prelate
- Sergio Pirozzi (born 1965), Italian football coach and politician
- Stefania Pirozzi (born 1993), Italian swimmer
