= Luigi Marrucci =

Italian priest (1945–2023)

His Excellency Luigi Marrucci
- Bishop Emeritus of Civitavecchia-Tarquinia
- Appointed: 25 November 2010
- Term ended: 18 June 2020
- Predecessor: Carlo Chenis
- Successor: Gianrico Ruzza

Orders
- Ordination: 29 June 1970
- Consecration: 29 January 2011 by Luigi Moretti

Personal details
- Born: 24 March 1945 Montescudaio, Italy
- Died: 4 June 2023 (aged 78) Civitavecchia, Italy
- Motto: IN FRACTIONE PANIS
- Coat of arms

Styles of Luigi Marrucci
- Reference style: His Excellency; The Most Reverend
- Spoken style: Your Excellency
- Religious style: Bishop

Luigi Marrucci (24 March 1945 – 4 June 2023) was an Italian Roman Catholic prelate who was bishop of Civitavecchia-Tarquinia from 2011 to 2020.

Catholic Church titles
Preceded by Carlo Chenis	Bishop of Civitavecchia-Tarquinia; 2010–2020	Succeeded by Gianrico Ruzza
