= Simón Bolívar Sánchez Carrión =

His Excellency, The Most Reverend Simón Bolívar Sánchez Carrión
- Apostolic Nuncio to Honduras; Titular Archbishop of Rosella
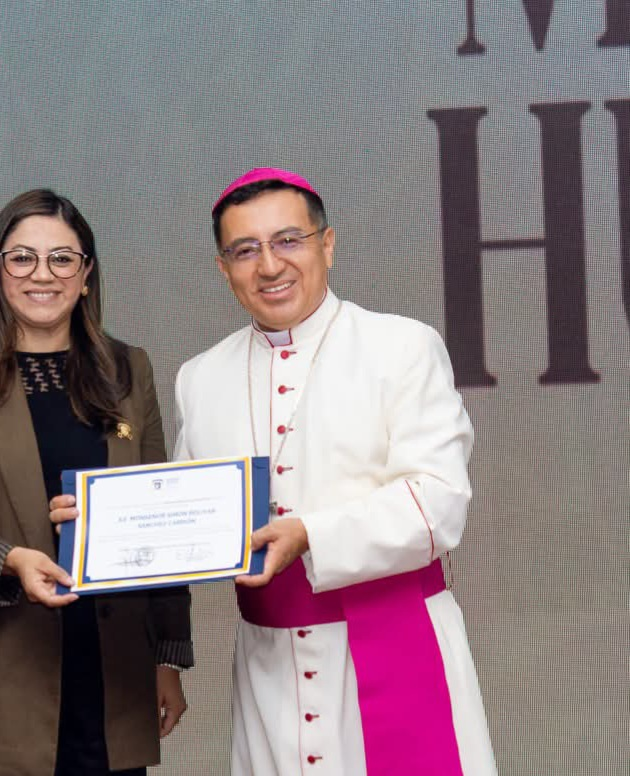
- His Excellency Simón Bolivar Sánchez in the UNICAH on June 24, 2026
- Appointed: 15 October 2024
- Predecessor: Gábor Pintér
- Other post: Titular Archbishop of Rosella

Orders
- Ordination: 13 September 1995
- Consecration: 11 January 2025 by Luciano Russo, Walter Jehová Heras Segarra, and Luis Cabrera Herrera

Personal details
- Born: 24 December 1971 (age 54) Olmedo, Ecuador

Styles of Simón Bolívar Sánchez Carrión
- Reference style: His Excellency; The Most Reverend
- Spoken style: Your Excellency
- Religious style: Archbishop

Simón Bolívar Sánchez Carrión (born 24 December 1971) is an Ecuadorian prelate of the Catholic Church who works in the diplomatic service of the Holy See.

== Biography ==
Simón Bolívar Sánchez Carrión was born on 24 December 1971 in Olmedo, Ecuador. He was ordained a priest for the Roman Catholic Diocese of Loja on 13 September 1995.

== Diplomatic career ==
He entered the diplomatic service of the Holy See on 1 July 2006 and served in the Pontifical Representations in Trinidad and Tobago, Bolivia, Turkey, Malta and Libya, Uruguay, and Serbia. He graduated in Canon Law and speaks Italian, Portuguese, English and French

On 15 October 2024, Pope Francis appointed him Titular Archbishop of Rosella and Apostolic Nuncio to Honduras. He was consecrated as an archbishop on 11 January 2025.

== See also ==
- List of heads of the diplomatic missions of the Holy See
