= Girolamo Grillo =

- Bishop of Civitavecchia-Tarquinia
- Church: Catholic Church
- Diocese: Diocese of Civitavecchia-Tarquinia
- In office: 20 December 1983 – 21 December 2006
- Predecessor: Antonio Mazza
- Successor: Carlo Chenis
- Previous posts: Bishop of Cassano all’Jonio (1979-1983)

Orders
- Ordination: 25 April 1953
- Consecration: 27 May 1979 by Pope John Paul II

Personal details
- Born: 18 August 1930 Parghelia, Province of Catanzaro, Kingdom of Italy
- Died: 22 August 2016 (aged 86) Odorheiu Secuiesc, Harghita County, Romania

Girolamo Grillo (18 August 1930, Parghelia – 22 August 2016, Odorheiu Secuiesc) was an Italian Roman Catholic bishop.

Ordained to the priesthood in 1954, Grillo served as bishop of the Roman Catholic Diocese of Civitavecchia-Tarquinia, Italy from 1988 to 2006.

== See also ==
- Roman Catholicism in Italy
