= Carlo Chenis =

Italian Catholic bishop (1954–2010)

Carlo Chenis S.D.B.
- Bishop of Civitavecchia-Tarquinia
- Church: Catholic Church
- Diocese: Diocese of Civitavecchia-Tarquinia
- In office: 21 December 2006 – 19 March 2010
- Predecessor: Girolamo Grillo
- Successor: Luigi Marrucci

Orders
- Ordination: 26 May 1984
- Consecration: 10 February 2007 by Tarcisio Bertone

Personal details
- Born: 20 April 1954 Turin, Italy
- Died: 19 March 2010 (aged 55) Rome, Italy
- Education: Salesian Pontifical University; University of Turin

Carlo Chenis (20 April 1954 – 19 March 2010) was an Italian Catholic bishop. He was ordained a priest in the Salesian Society and later became the Bishop of Civitavecchia–Tarquinia.

== Early life and career ==
Carlo was born in Turin, Italy on 20 April 1954 and completed his studies in philosophy and theology at the Pontifical Salesian University. On 26 May 1984, he was ordained a priest in Cuorgne for the Salesians of Don Bosco, and later obtained an academic degree in materials science with a specialization in literary arts at the University of Turin in 1989. He held numerous positions in the administrative academic when he became a professor of theoretical philosophy at the Pontifical Salesian University. He became a coordinator of the Secretariat of Student Relations and chaplain of the university, from 1986 to 1998. During his job as a coordinator, he was appointed secretary of the Pontifical Commission for the Cultural Heritage of the Church in 1995.

== Personal life ==
On 21 December 2006, Chenis was elected bishop of Civitavecchia–Tarquinia and later received his episcopal consecration in the Basilica of St. John Bosco in Rome from the Secretary of State Cardinal, Tarcisio Bertone, on 10 February 2007. On 24 February, he took possession of the diocese, overseeing the port of Civitavecchia, a church within the Trajan markets.

== Death ==
Chenis died on 19 March 2010, at the age of 55.
