= Apostolic Nunciature to Nicaragua =

Diplomatic post of the Holy See

The Apostolic Nunciature to Nicaragua is an ecclesiastical office of the Catholic Church in Nicaragua. It is a diplomatic post of the Holy See, whose representative is called the Apostolic Nuncio with the rank of an ambassador. The nuncio resides in Managua.

The Holy See used a delegate—a member of its diplomatic corps not granted official status by their host country—to represent its interests to church officials, civil society, and the government until it appointed its first Apostolic Nuncio to Nicaragua in 1933. For fifty years the Nuncio held a second appointment as nuncio, usually to Honduras; since April 1986 the Nuncio to Nicaragua has held only that position.

In 2021, as relations between the Church and the government of Nicaraguan dictator Daniel Ortega deteriorated, the government abolished the title "dean of the diplomatic corps", traditionally held by the representative of the Holy See. In March 2022, it withdrew its acceptance of the apostolic nuncio, Waldemar Stanisław Sommertag, ending his term as nuncio and forcing him to leave the country. The nunciature remains open.

== List of papal representatives to Nicaragua ==
Apostolic Delegates and Internuncios

- Giovanni Cagliero, S.D.B. (26 December 1908 – 6 December 1915)
- Giovanni Battista Marenco S.D.B. (2 February 1917 – 22 October 1921)
- Angelo Rotta (16 October 1922 (Note: The Internunciature to Central America then covered Costa Rica, El Salvador, Honduras, and Nicaragua.) – 9 May 1925)
- Giuseppe Fietta (27 February 1926 – 23 September 1930)
- Carlo Chiarlo (28 January 1932 – 30 September 1933)

Apostolic Nuncios

- Carlo Chiarlo (30 September 1933 – 1940)
- Luigi Centoz (3 December 1941 – 4 October 1948)
- Liberato Tosti (4 October 1948 – 1949) (Note: Tosti resigned in 1949 at age 65 and died on 20 October 1950.)
- Antonio Taffi (9 January 1950 – 1958) (Note: Taffi resigned as Nuncio to Honduras and Nicaragua in 1958 at age 60; these were his last positions as nuncio.)
- Sante Portalupi (29 January 1959 – 27 September 1967)
- Lorenzo Antonetti (24 February 1968 – 29 June 1973)
- Gabriel Montalvo Higuera (14 June 1974 – 18 March 1980)
- Andrea Cordero Lanza di Montezemolo (25 October 1980 – 4 April 1986)
- Paolo Giglio (4 April 1986 – 25 March 1995)
- Luigi Travaglino (2 May 1995 – 30 October 2001)
- Jean-Paul Gobel (31 October 2001 – 10 October 2007)
- Henryk Józef Nowacki (28 November 2007 – 28 June 2012)
- Fortunatus Nwachukwu (12 November 2012 – 4 November 2017)
- Waldemar Stanisław Sommertag (15 February 2018 – 6 March 2022)
