= Rodolfo Caroli =

Italian prelate (1869–1921)

- Apostolic Internuncio to Bolivia
- Church: Catholic Church
- See: Apostolic Nunciature to Bolivia
- In office: 28 April 1917 – 25 January 1921
- Predecessor: Angelo Giacinto Scapardini
- Successor: Tito Trocchi
- Other post: Titular Archbishop of Tyrus (1917-1921)
- Previous post: Bishop of Ceneda (1913-1917)

Orders
- Ordination: 1 April 1893
- Consecration: 19 October 1913 by Gaetano de Lai

Personal details
- Born: 16 December 1869 Rome, Papal States
- Died: 25 January 1921 (aged 51) La Paz, La Paz Department, Republic of Bolivia

Rodolfo Caroli (16 December 1869 – 25 January 1921) was an Italian prelate of the Catholic Church who worked in the Diocese of Rome, was Bishop of Ceneda for four years, and then an archbishop and papal nuncio for four years before dying at the age of 51.

== Biography ==
Rodolfo Caroli was born on 16 December 1869 in Rome. He was ordained a priest of the Diocese of Rome on 1 April 1893.

He was on the staff of the Congregation for Religious and rector of the Pontifical Lombard Seminary when, on 28 July 1913, Pope Pius X named him Bishop of Ceneda.

He received his episcopal consecration on 19 October 1913 from Cardinal Gaetano de Lai.

On 28 April 1917, Pope Benedict XV named him Apostolic Internuncio to Bolivia and titular archbishop of Tyre. There he founded a society to promote vocations, won government funding for four places at the Collegio Pio Latino Americano in Rome, and toured the country "largely using primitive means and often putting himself in certain dangers". He critiqued the seminaries and urged greater reforms than those recommended by an external review.

Caroli died in La Paz of an undiagnosed illness on 25 January 1921 at the age of 51.
