= Apostolic Nunciature to Honduras =

Diplomatic post of the Holy See

The Apostolic Nunciature to Honduras is an ecclesiastical office of the Catholic Church in Honduras. It is a diplomatic post of the Holy See, whose representative is called the Apostolic Nuncio with the rank of an ambassador. The nuncio resides in Tegucigalpa.

The Holy See used a delegate—a member of its diplomatic corps not granted official status by their host country—to represent its interests to church officials, civil society, and the government. The Holy See appointed its first Apostolic Nuncio in 1933. For fifty years the Nuncio held a second appointment as nuncio, usually to Nicaragua; since April 1986 the Nuncio to Honduras has held only that position.

== List of papal representatives to Honduras ==
Apostolic Delegates and Internuncios

- Giovanni Cagliero, S.D.B. (19 December 1908 - 6 December 1915)
- Giovanni Battista Marenco, S.D.B. (2 February 1917 - 22 October 1921)
- Angelo Rotta (16 October 1922 (Note: The Internunciature to Central America then covered Costa Rica, El Salvador, Honduras, and Nicaragua.) – 9 May 1925)
- Giuseppe Fietta (27 February 1926 - 23 September 1930)
- Carlo Chiarlo (28 January 1932 - 30 September 1933)

Apostolic Nuncios

- Albert Levame (21 December 1933 - 31 October 1938)
- Federico Lunardi (31 October 1938 - December 1947)
- Liberato Tosti (4 October 1948 - 1949) (Note: Tosti resigned in 1949 at age 65 and died on 20 October 1950.)
- Antonio Taffi (9 January 1950 - 1958) (Note: Taffi resigned as Nuncio to Honduras and Nicaragua in 1958 at age 60; these were his last positions as nuncio.)
- Sante Portalupi (29 January 1959 - 27 September 1967)
- Lorenzo Antonetti (23 February 1968 - 29 June 1973)
- Gabriel Montalvo Higuera (14 June 1974 - 18 March 1980)
- Andrea Cordero Lanza di Montezemolo (25 October 1980 - 1 April 1986)
- Francesco De Nittis (10 April 1986 - 25 June 1990)
- Manuel Monteiro de Castro (21 August 1990 - 12 April 1991)
- Luigi Conti (12 April 1991 - 15 May 1999)
- George Panikulam (4 December 1999 - 3 July 2003)
- Antonio Arcari (18 July 2003 - 12 December 2008)
- Luigi Bianco (12 January 2009 - 12 July 2014)
- Novatus Rugambwa (5 March 2015 - 29 March 2019)
- Gábor Pintér (12 November 2019 - 27 July 2024)
- Simón Bolívar Sánchez Carrión (15 October 2024 - present)
