= Dreams of Saint John Bosco =

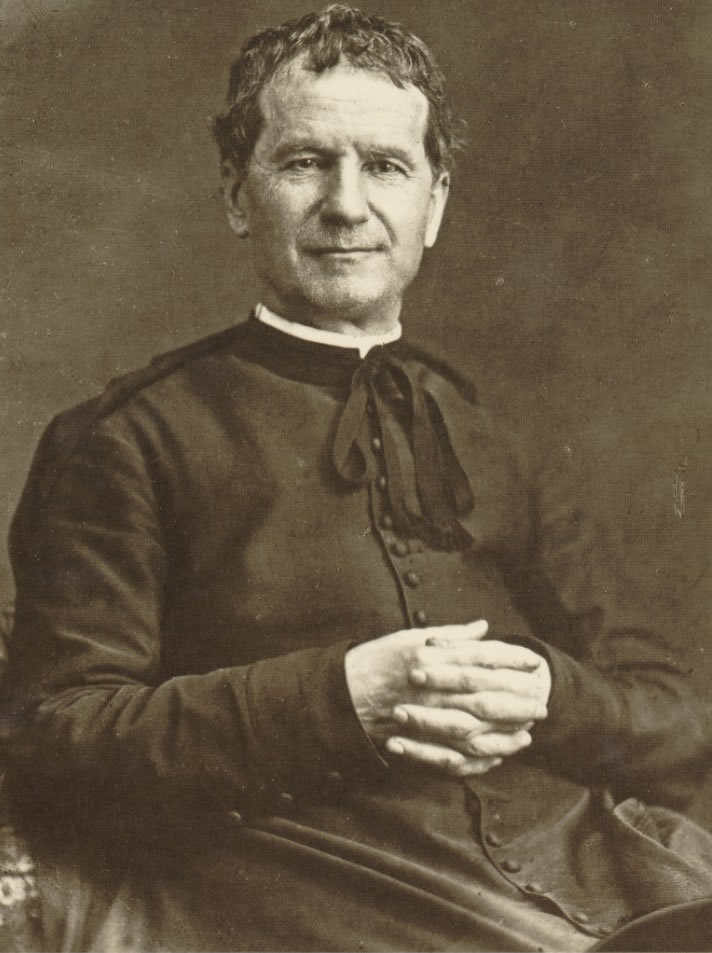
Saint John Bosco in Turin, 1880

The dreams of Saint John Bosco (commonly known as Don Bosco's dreams) are a collection of over 150 reported dreams, allegorical visions, and nocturnal narratives recounted by John Bosco (1815–1888), a 19th-century Italian Roman Catholic priest, educator, and writer who founded the Salesians of Don Bosco. Ranging from early vocational experiences to moral parables and missionary prophecies, these accounts played a central role in Bosco's personal discernment, the foundation and governance of the Salesian Society, and his educational philosophy, known as the Salesian Preventive System.

Bosco related many of his dreams to the pupils and apprentices living at his oratory in the Valdocco district of Turin, especially during the nightly communal assembly known as the "Good Night" (buona notte). At the urging of Pope Pius IX, Bosco wrote down several of these experiences—most notably his foundational "Dream at Nine Years of Age"—in his autobiographical Memoirs of the Oratory of Saint Francis de Sales. The majority of the narratives were later documented in the 19-volume biographical compilation Biographical Memoirs of Saint John Bosco (Memorie Biografiche), published between 1898 and 1939 by Giovanni Battista Lemoyne, Angelo Amadei, and Eugenio Ceria.

== Historical background and context ==
=== Pastoral setting at Valdocco ===
During the mid-19th century, Turin experienced rapid industrialization and urban migration, resulting in high numbers of poor, displaced rural youths who faced exploitation, homelessness, and delinquency. In response, Don Bosco opened an oratory in Valdocco to provide shelter, education, and trade apprenticeships.

To foster a familial atmosphere and communicate moral instruction, Bosco instituted the practice of the "Good Night" (la buona notte), a short address delivered each evening before the youth retired to sleep. Bosco regularly recounted dreams during these gatherings, employing allegorical imagery to encourage moral reflection, caution against vice, and promote the reception of the sacraments.

=== Papal encouragement and documentation ===
During a private audience in Rome in 1858, Pope Pius IX instructed Bosco to write an account of the foundation of the Oratory and the spiritual experiences that guided it, stressing their value for the future members of the Salesian Society.

Bosco complied by penning the manuscript of the Memoirs of the Oratory of Saint Francis de Sales in the 1870s. Later, Salesian chroniclers gathered handwritten notes, eyewitness testimonies, and diary entries kept by early collaborators—including Michael Rua and Giulio Barberis—which were eventually edited into the comprehensive Biographical Memoirs of Saint John Bosco.

== Major dreams ==
=== The Dream at Nine Years of Age (c. 1824–1825) ===
The most influential of Bosco's accounts is the "Dream at Nine Years of Age" (Il sogno dei nove anni), experienced in Castelnuovo d'Asti around 1824 or 1825. Bosco regarded this experience as the vocational foundation of his life's work.

In the dream, young John found himself in a large courtyard filled with fighting and swearing boys. As he rushed forward to subdue them with his fists, a man of noble bearing clad in a white mantle appeared and told him:

You will have to win these friends of yours not with blows, but with gentleness and kindness. So begin right now to show them that sin is ugly and virtue beautiful.

A majestic woman appeared beside the man and showed John that the unruly boys had transformed into wild animals—wolves, bears, and other beasts. She instructed him to make himself "humble, strong, and robust," promising that what she did for these animals, he would one day do for her children. The wild beasts then turned into gentle lambs playing together. When young John wept in perplexity, the woman placed her hand upon his head and told him: "In due time, you will understand everything."

This narrative became the guiding inspiration for Bosco's Salesian Preventive System, which replaced corporal punishment with reason, religion, and loving-kindness (amorevolezza).

=== The Dream of the Two Columns (1862) ===
On 30 May 1862, Bosco recounted to his students an allegorical vision concerning the trials of the Catholic Church, commonly called the "Dream of the Two Columns".

In the dream, Bosco saw a large ship symbolizing the Church, steered by the Pope and surrounded by smaller vessels amidst a tempestuous sea. The ship was assailed by an enemy fleet armed with cannons, incendiary devices, and polemical books. Rising from the sea were two tall marble columns:

- The taller column was crowned by a large consecrated Host, with the inscription Salus Credentium ("Salvation of Believers").
- The second column was crowned by a statue of the Blessed Virgin Mary, inscribed Auxilium Christianorum ("Help of Christians").

During the battle, the pope was struck down and died, but his successor was immediately elected and took command. The new pontiff guided the vessel between the two columns, securing it to both with heavy chains. As soon as the ship was anchored, the attacking fleet fell into disarray, destroyed one another, and a great calm followed. Bosco interpreted the dream as showing that the Church's preservation amid persecution would rest on two devotions: the Holy Eucharist and devotion to Mary Help of Christians.

=== The Dream of Hell (1868) ===
In April and May 1868, Bosco experienced a sequence of dreams regarding the afterlife and moral danger. Guided by an angelic figure, Bosco observed a downhill path bordered with flowers, which hid snares labeled with various vices. He saw youth slipping into these traps and tumbling into a fiery chasm.

Upon reaching the threshold of the abyss, the guide allowed Bosco to view the suffering of lost souls and the regret caused by bad companions and neglected confessions. Bosco used this account to urge his students to make thorough confessions and reform their daily conduct, while emphasizing that none of the boys shown were doomed if they amended their lives.

=== Missionary dreams and South America (1871–1885) ===
Between 1871 and 1885, Bosco recounted several dreams that directly motivated the international expansion of the Salesians. In 1871 and 1872, he dreamt of unexplored territories populated by indigenous peoples across vast plains, mountain ranges, and broad rivers.

Comparing his dream descriptions with geographical reports, Bosco identified the location as Patagonia in Argentina. In 1875, he dispatched the first Salesian missionary expedition to South America, led by Giovanni Cagliero. Subsequent dreams in 1883 and 1885 encouraged further missionary foundations throughout the Andes, central Brazil, and into Asia.

=== The Dream of the Pergola of Roses (1847) ===
In 1847, Bosco dreamt of walking through an arbor covered with blooming roses and inviting his followers to join him. As they progressed, sharp thorns beneath the foliage wounded their hands and feet, prompting several companions to turn back. Those who persevered reached a peaceful clearing. Bosco interpreted the vision as an illustration of religious life in the Salesian congregation: outwardly attractive through charitable works, but requiring perseverance through hidden sacrifice and daily trials.

== Thematic categorization ==
Salesian scholars categorize Bosco's dream narratives into several broad groups:

| Category | Description | Key Examples |
|---|---|---|
| Vocational and foundational | Experiences that guided Bosco's personal calling and the institutional establishment of the Salesians. | Dream at Nine Years of Age (1825); The Pergola of Roses (1847). |
| Pedagogical and moral | Allegories used during evening talks to address character formation and spiritual vigilance among students. | The Dream of Hell (1868); The Monster Elephant (1853). |
| Ecclesiological and eschatological | Visions concerning the trials of the papacy and the Church during the Risorgimento. | The Dream of the Two Columns (1862); Funerals at Court (1854). |
| Missionary and geographic | Visions of distant territories and populations that guided Salesian overseas foundations. | The Dream of Patagonia (1871–1872); The South American Cordillera (1883). |

== Critical analysis and interpretation ==
=== Salesian historiography ===
Early Salesian biographies often presented Bosco's dreams primarily as literal, supernatural prophecies and direct divine interventions. Beginning in the mid-20th century, Salesian historians—most notably Pietro Stella and Arthur J. Lenti—introduced a critical documentary method.

Stella demonstrated that the texts preserved in the Biographical Memoirs reflect a degree of literary editing by Lemoyne and his collaborators, who synthesized various notes and retellings. Furthermore, Stella pointed out that Bosco frequently utilized the "dream" as a recognized pedagogical and homiletic literary form common in 19th-century Piedmont, allowing him to offer direct pastoral advice and moral correction without claiming personal prophetic authority.

=== Catholic theological status ===
In Catholic theology, Bosco's dreams are classified as private revelation. Under church teaching, private revelations do not belong to the definitive deposit of faith, and Catholics are not obliged to accept them as dogma. The Church permits them for spiritual reading within the context of Saint John Bosco's recognized holiness and pastoral mission.

== See also ==
- John Bosco
- Salesians of Don Bosco
- Salesian Preventive System
- Mary Help of Christians
- Private revelation
- Christian mysticism

== Bibliography ==
- Bosco, John (1989). Memoirs of the Oratory of Saint Francis de Sales from 1815 to 1855. New Rochelle, NY: Don Bosco Publications. ISBN 0-89944-139-4.
- Braido, Pietro (1999). Prevenire, non reprimere: Il sistema educativo di Don Bosco (in Italian). Rome: LAS. ISBN 978-88-213-0415-6.
- Desramaut, François (1996). Don Bosco et son Temps (1815–1888) (in French). Turin: Società Editrice Internazionale. ISBN 978-2-906295-60-5.
- Lemoyne, Giovanni Battista; Amadei, Angelo; Ceria, Eugenio (1965–1988). The Biographical Memoirs of Saint John Bosco (19 vols.). New Rochelle, NY: Don Bosco Publications / Salesiana Publishers.
- Lenti, Arthur J. (2004–2010). Don Bosco: History and Spirit (7 vols.). Rome and New Rochelle: Salesian Institute of Graphic Arts.
- Stella, Pietro (1985). Don Bosco: Life and Work. New Rochelle, NY: Salesiana Publishers. ISBN 978-0-89944-061-3.
- Stella, Pietro (1996). Don Bosco's Dreams: A Historico-Documentary Analysis of Selected Samples. New Rochelle, NY: Salesiana Publishers. ISBN 978-0-89944-245-7.
- Wirth, Morand (1982). Don Bosco and the Salesians: One Hundred and Fifty Years of History. New Rochelle, NY: Don Bosco Publications.
