= Umberto Mozzoni =

Argentine Cardinal (1904–1983)

His Eminence Umberto Mozzoni
- Cardinal Protodeacon Emeritus
- Church: Roman Catholic Church
- Appointed: 15 June 1980
- Term ended: 2 February 1983
- Predecessor: Sergio Pignedoli
- Successor: Opilio Rossi
- Other post: Cardinal-Priest pro hac vice of Sant'Eugenio (1983)
- Previous posts: Titular Archbishop of Side (1954-73); Apostolic Nuncio to Bolivia (1954-58); Apostolic Nuncio to Argentina (1958-69); Apostolic Nuncio to Brazil (1969-73); Cardinal-Deacon of Sant'Eugenio (1973-83); President of the Commission of Cardinals for the Pontifical Shrines (1974-83)

Orders
- Ordination: 14 August 1927
- Consecration: 5 December 1954 by James Charles McGuigan
- Created cardinal: 5 March 1973 by Pope Paul VI
- Rank: Cardinal-Deacon (1973-83); Cardinal-Priest (1983)

Personal details
- Born: Umberto Mozzoni; 29 June 1904 Buenos Aires, Argentina
- Died: 7 November 1983 (aged 79) Rome, Italy
- Buried: Macerata Cathedral
- Education: Pontifical Roman Seminary; Pontifical Roman Athenaeum Saint Apollinare
- Motto: Duc in altum
- Coat of arms

Umberto Mozzoni (29 June 1904 – 7 November 1983) was an Argentine Cardinal of the Roman Catholic Church. He served as Apostolic Nuncio to Brazil from 1969 to 1973, and was made a cardinal in 1973.

== Biography ==
Umberto Mozzoni was born in Buenos Aires, but his family later moved to Macerata, Italy. He attended the seminary there before going to Rome, where he studied at the Pontifical Roman Seminary, Pontifical Roman Athenaeum S. Apollinare, and the University of Rome. Ordained a priest on 14 August 1927, Mozzoni then did pastoral work in the Diocese of Macerata and taught at its seminary until 1935. He successively served as secretary and auditor of the apostolic delegations to Canada and Great Britain, and the nunciature to Portugal. He was raised to the rank of a Privy Chamberlain of His Holiness on 7 October 1936, and a Domestic Prelate of His Holiness on 2 January 1948.

On 13 November 1954, Mozzoni was appointed Nuncio to Bolivia and Titular Archbishop of Side. He received his episcopal consecration on the following 5 December from Cardinal James Charles McGuigan, with Archbishop Antonio Samoré and Bishop Sivio Cassulo serving as co-consecrators, in the chapel of the Pontifical Roman Seminary. During his tenure as the Bolivian nuncio, he worked for the protection of foreign missionaries. Mozzoni was later named Nuncio to Argentina on 20 September 1958, dispatching 2,000 missionaries in October 1960 "to open the dialogue between the Church and Argentina on the everlasting efficacy of the Gospel for the advancement of the Argentine people". He attended the Second Vatican Council from 1962 to 1965, and became Nuncio to Brazil on 19 April 1969.

Pope Paul VI created him Cardinal-Deacon of Sant'Eugenio in the consistory of 5 March 1973. On 19 June 1974, Mozzoni was appointed President of the Cardinalatial Commission for the Shrines of Pompei and Loreto. He was one of the cardinal electors who participated in the conclaves of August and October 1978, which selected Popes John Paul I and John Paul II respectively. Mozzoni was Cardinal Protodeacon from 15 June 1980 until he chose to become a Cardinal Priest, with the same titular church, on 2 February 1983.

The Cardinal collapsed while celebrating Mass and later died in a Roman clinic, at age 79. He is buried in the Cathedral of Macerata.

Catholic Church titles
Preceded by Sergio Pignedoli	Apostolic Nuncio to Bolivia; 13 November 1954 – 20 September 1958	Succeeded by Carmine Rocco
Preceded by Mario Zanin	Apostolic Nuncio to Argentina; 20 September 1958 – 19 April 1969	Succeeded by Lino Zanini
Preceded by Sebastiano Baggio	Apostolic Nuncio to Brazil; 19 April 1969 – 1973	Succeeded by Carmine Rocco
Preceded by Silvio Oddi	President of the Cardinalatial Commission for the Shrines of Pompei and Loreto; 1974–1983	Succeeded by Opilio Rossi
Preceded by Sergio Pignedoli	Cardinal Protodeacon; 15 June 1980 – 2 February 1983	Succeeded by Opilio Rossi
