= Misuraca =

Misuraca is an Italian surname. Notable people with the surname include:

- Gianvito Misuraca (born 1990), Italian footballer
- Giuseppe Misuraca (1884–1962), Catholic archbishop and diplomat
- Logan Misuraca (born 1999), American professional stock car racing driver
- Mike Misuraca (born 1968), American baseball player
