= Carlo Grano =

Italian cardinal

His Eminence Carlo Grano
- Apostolic Nuncio Emeritus to Italy
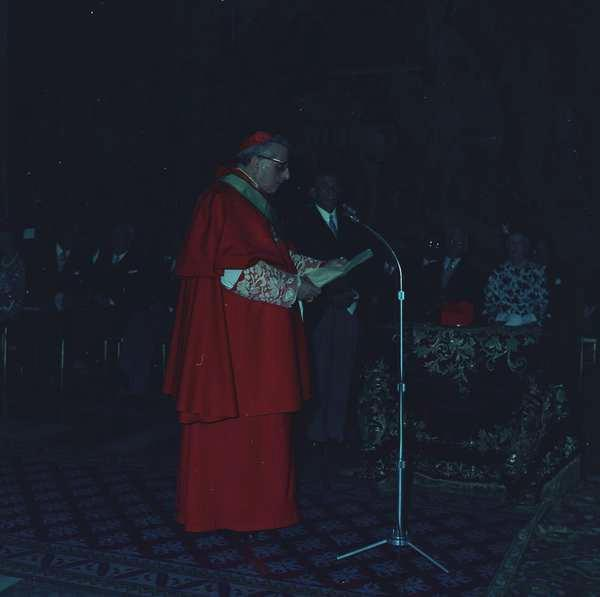
- Church: Roman Catholic Church
- Appointed: 14 December 1958
- Term ended: 26 June 1967
- Predecessor: Giuseppe Fietta
- Successor: Egano Righi-Lambertini
- Other post: Cardinal-Priest of San Marcello (1967–76)
- Previous posts: Head of Protocol of the Secretariat of State (1945–52); Titular Archbishop of Thessalonica (1958–67)

Orders
- Ordination: 14 July 1912 by Giuseppe Ceppetelli
- Consecration: 27 December 1958 by Pope John XXIII
- Created cardinal: 26 June 1967 by Pope Paul VI
- Rank: Cardinal-Priest

Personal details
- Born: Carlo Grano; 14 October 1887 Rome, Kingdom of Italy
- Died: 2 April 1976 (aged 88) Rome, Italy
- Buried: San Marcello
- Education: Pontifical Major Roman Seminary; Pontifical Roman Athenaeum S. Apollinare
- Motto: Copiosa messis e grano humili

Styles of Carlo Grano
- Reference style: His Eminence
- Spoken style: Your Eminence
- Informal style: Cardinal
- See: none

Carlo Grano (14 October 1887 – 2 April 1976) was an Italian cardinal of the Roman Catholic Church who served as Apostolic Nuncio to Italy from 1958 to 1967, and was raised to the rank of cardinal in 1967.

== Biography ==
Born in Rome, Grano attended the Pontifical Roman Seminary before studying philosophy, theology, and canon law at the Pontifical Roman Athenaeum S. Apollinare. He was ordained to the priesthood by Archbishop Giuseppe Ceppetelli on 14 June 1912, and then did pastoral work in Rome until 1920. Grano was named a pontifical ceremonery supernumerary on 23 January 1920, and also served as a staff member (1923–1945), chief of protocol (1945–1953), and Substitute (1953–1958) of the Vatican Secretariat of State.

On 13 December 1958, Grano was appointed Apostolic Nuncio to Italy and Titular Archbishop of Thessalonica. He received his episcopal consecration on the following 27 December from Pope John XXIII himself, with Bishops Girolamo Bortignon, OFM Cap, and Gioacchino Muccin serving as co-consecrators, in St. Peter's Basilica. Grano later attended the Second Vatican Council from 1962 to 1965.

Pope Paul VI created him Cardinal-Priest of San Marcello al Corso in the consistory of 26 June 1967. Grano lost his right to participate in a papal conclave upon reaching the age of 80, on 1 January 1971.

Cardinal Grano died in his native Rome, at age 88. He is buried in San Marcello al Corso.

== Honours and awards ==
- Grand Officer of the Order of Merit of the Italian Republic (1953)
- Grand Cross of the Order of Merit of the Federal Republic of Germany (1953)
- Grand Cross of the Order of Merit of the Italian Republic (1954)
- Grand Decoration of Honour in Silver with Sash for Services to the Republic of Austria (1958)

Catholic Church titles
Preceded by Giuseppe Fietta	Apostolic Nuncio to Italy; 15 December 1958 – 26 June 1967	Succeeded by Egano Righi-Lambertini
