= Apostolic Nunciature to Venezuela =

Diplomatic Mission of the Holy See in Venezuela

- Location: Caracas
- Address: Nunciatura Apostolica, Avenida La Salle, Caracas 1050.
- Coordinates: 10°30′03.6″N 66°53′05.2″W
- Apostolic Nuncio: Vacant

The Apostolic Nunciature to Venezuela is the diplomatic mission of the Holy See to Venezuela, formally established in 1921. The current Apostolic Nuncio is Archbishop Alberto Ortega Martín, who was named to the position by Pope Francis on 14 May 2024.

The Apostolic Nunciature to the Bolivarian Republic of Venezuela is an ecclesiastical office of the Catholic Church in Venezuela, with the rank of an embassy. The nuncio serves both as the ambassador of the Holy See to the President of Venezuela, and as delegate and point-of-contact between the Catholic hierarchy in Venezuela and the Pope. The office of Apostolic Nuncio is currently always assigned to titular archbishops.

The Nunciature is located on the Avenida La Salle ('La Salle Avenue'), in Caracas 1050, in the Distrito Capital, Venezuela.

== History ==
The Apostolic Nunciature was established as the Apostolic Delegation to Venezuela, led by Serafino Vannutelli in 1869. It was the result of an effort by the Holy See to establish communication between the Pope (Pius IX) and the several Latin American states. Formal relations, however, were not established until March 21, 1920, when the delegation was elevated to the rank of nunciature.

== Apostolic Nuncios to Venezuela ==
- Serafino Vannutelli (23 July 1869 - 10 September 1875)
- Rocco Cocchia, O.F.M. Cap. (13 July 1874 - 9 August 1883)
- Mario Mocenni (14 August 1877 - 28 March 1882)
- Spiridion-Salvatore-Costantino Buhadgiar (28 November 1890 - 10 August 1891)
- Giulio Tonti (11 July 1892 - 24 February 1893)
- Francesco Marchetti Selvaggiani (16 February 1918 - 4 December 1920)
- Fernando Cento (24 June 1926 - 26 July 1936)
- Luigi Centoz (16 September 1936 - 19 February 1940)
- Giuseppe Misuraca (2 July 1941 - March 1949)
- Armando Lombardi (13 February 1950 - 1954)
- Sergio Pignedoli (19 October 1954 - 15 April 1955)
- Raffaele Forni (24 September 1955 - 27 February 1960)
- Luigi Dadaglio (28 October 1961 - 8 July 1967)
- Felice Pirozzi (9 January 1967 - 17 October 1970)
- Antonio del Giudice (2 December 1970 - 18 December 1974 )
- Giovanni Mariani (11 January 1975 - January 1978)
- Ubaldo Calabresi (5 January 1978 - 23 January 1981)
- Luciano Storero (2 February 1981 - 28 June 1990)
- Oriano Quilici (11 July 1990 - 8 July 1997)
- Leonardo Sandri (22 July 1997 - 1 March 2000)
- André Dupuy (27 March 2000 - 24 February 2005)
- Giacinto Berloco (24 February 2005 - 18 June 2009)
- Pietro Parolin (17 August 2009 - 15 October 2013)
- Aldo Giordano (26 October 2013 - 8 May 2021)
- Alberto Ortega Martín (14 May 2024 - present)
