= Fernández Anchorena Palace =

Architecturally Significant Building in Buenos Aires, Argentina

Coordinates: 34°35′22″S 58°23′09″W

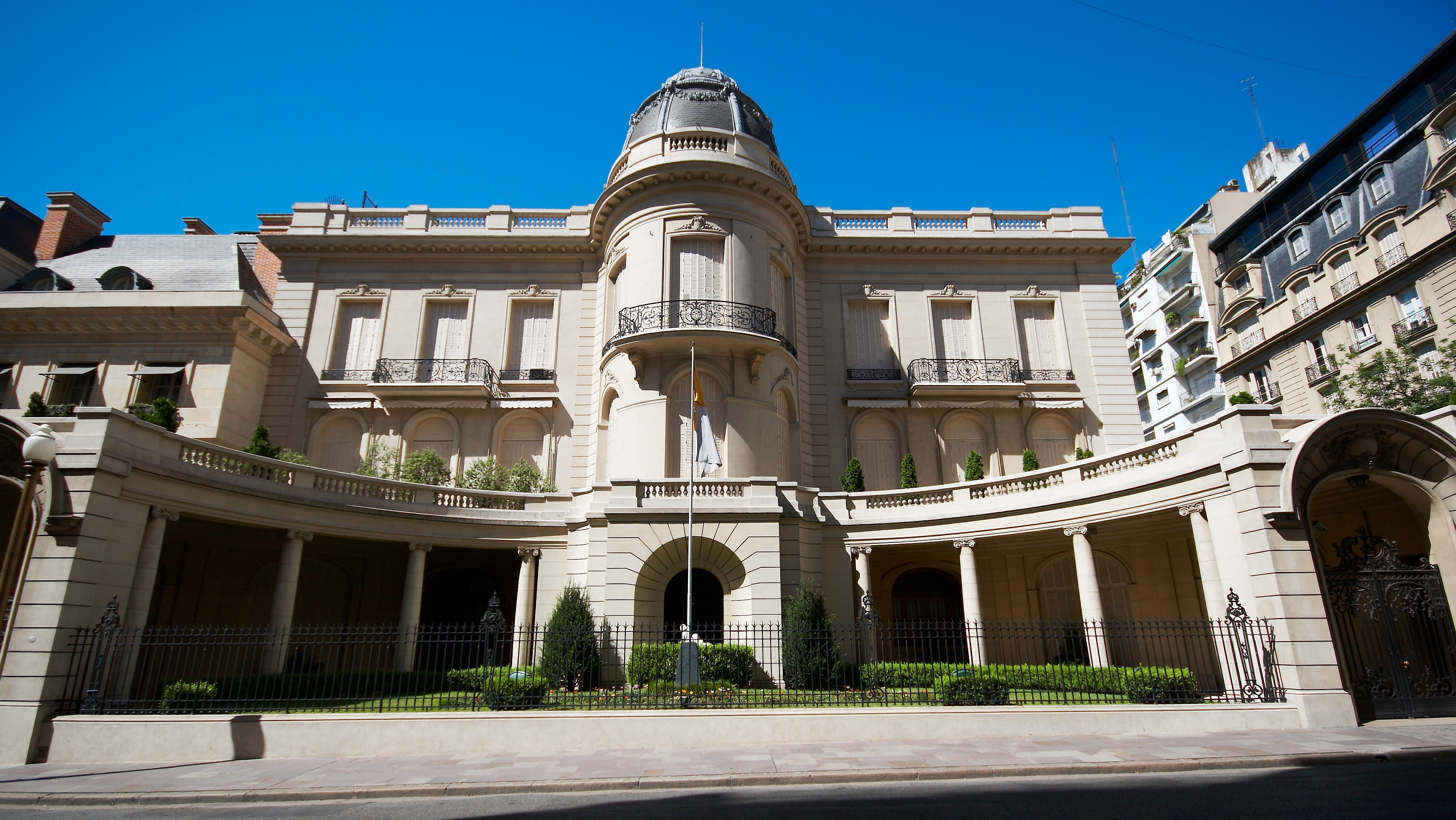
The Fernández Anchorena Palace (today the Vatican Nunciature).

The Fernández Anchorena Palace is an architecturally significant former residence in the Recoleta section of Buenos Aires, Argentina. Today, it serves as the Apostolic Nunciature in Argentina.

== Overview ==
The mansion was commissioned by Juan Antonio Fernández and his wife, Rosa de Anchorena, to Eduardo Le Monnier (1873 – 1931), a French Argentine architect. Designed in 1907 in the Second Empire style favored among Argentine high society at the time, the palace was completed in 1909, though the couple never inhabited the Alvear Avenue landmark.

The family made the mansion available for social occasions and public ceremonies in subsequent years; from 1922 to 1928, most notably, it served as the official residence to the President of Argentina, Marcelo Torcuato de Alvear, and his wife, the opera chanteuse Regina Pacini de Alvear.

The mansion was sold to Adelia María Harilaos de Olmos, the widow of prominent Córdoba Province landowner Ambrosio Harilaos de Olmos, in 1940. The founder of the Catholic Ladies' League and financier of a working women's assistance fund, a number of churches and a hospital pavilion bequeathed the residence to the Holy See, in 1947. Upon her death in 1949, it became the Apostolic Nunciature in Argentina; the Pope at the time, Pius XII, had been a guest of hers (as Cardinal Pacelli) for his stay in Buenos Aires on occasion of the Eucharistic Congress held in 1934.
