= Beda Giovanni Cardinale =

Italian prelate

Beda Giovanni Cardinale O.S.B.
- Apostolic Nuncio to Portugal
- Church: Catholic Church
- In office: 18 June 1928 – 1 December 1933
- Predecessor: Sebastiano Nicotra
- Successor: Pietro Ciriaci
- Other post: Titular Archbishop of Chersonesus in Zechia (1922-1933)
- Previous posts: Apostolic Nuncio to Paraguay & Argentina(1922-1925); Archbishop of Perugia (1910-1922); Apostolic Administrator of Perugia (1910); Titular Archbishop of Laodicea in Phrygia (1910); Bishop of Tarquinia e Civitavecchia (1907-1910)

Orders
- Ordination: 1 April 1893
- Consecration: 9 June 1907 by Girolamo Maria Gotti

Personal details
- Born: 30 July 1869 Genoa, Kingdom of Italy
- Died: 1 December 1933 (aged 64) Genoa, Kingdom of Italy

Beda Giovanni Cardinale O.S.B. (30 July 1869 – 1 December 1933), also Giovanni Beda Cardinale, was an Italian prelate of the Catholic Church who headed dioceses in Italy from 1907 to 1922 and then served in the diplomatic service of the Holy See in Latin America and Portugal.

== Biography ==
Beda Giovanni Cardinale was born on 30 July 1869 in Genoa. He was ordained a priest of the Order of Saint Benedict on 1 April 1893.

He became the abbot of the monastery of Praglia near Padua in February 1905, shortly after it was restored to the Benedictines after being suppressed for 38 years.

On 27 May 1907, Pope Pius X named him Bishop of Civitavecchia-Tarquinia. He received his episcopal consecration on 9 June 1907 from Cardinal Girolamo Maria Gotti.

On 3 February 1910, Pope Pius appointed him titular archbishop of Laodicea in Phrygia and Apostolic Administrator of Perugia. He became bishop there on 8 November 1910.

On 9 October 1922, Pope Pius XI named him titular archbishop of Chersonesus in Zechia and Apostolic Nuncio to Argentina. On 16 October he was given the responsibility of Apostolic Nuncio to Paraguay as well. He returned to Rome after the government of Argentina declared him persona non grata in the course of a protracted dispute over the appointment of a new archbishop of Buenos Aires.

On 21 June 1928, Pope Pius appointed him Apostolic Nuncio to Portugal.

He died on 1 December 1933 at the age of 64.
