= Antonio Taffi =

Italian catholic priest

Antonio Taffi (11 December 1897 – 6 January 1970) was an Italian prelate of the Catholic Church who served in the diplomatic service of the Holy See. He became an archbishop in 1946 and led the offices representing the Holy See in Cuba, Nicaragua, and Honduras.

== Biography ==
Antonio Taffi was born on 11 December 1897 in Farnese, Italy. He was ordained a priest on 19 February 1921.

To prepare for a diplomatic career he entered the Pontifical Ecclesiastical Academy in 1942.

On 14 May 1947, Pope Pius XII appointed him Apostolic Nuncio to Cuba and titular archbishop of Sergiopolis.

He received his episcopal consecration on 8 June 1947 from Cardinal Benedetto Aloisi Masella.

On 9 January 1950, Pope Paul named him Apostolic Nuncio to both Nicaragua and Honduras. He resigned from these posts in 1958 at the age of 60.

He died on 6 January 1970.
