= Apostolic Nunciature to Brazil =

Diplomatic post of the Holy See

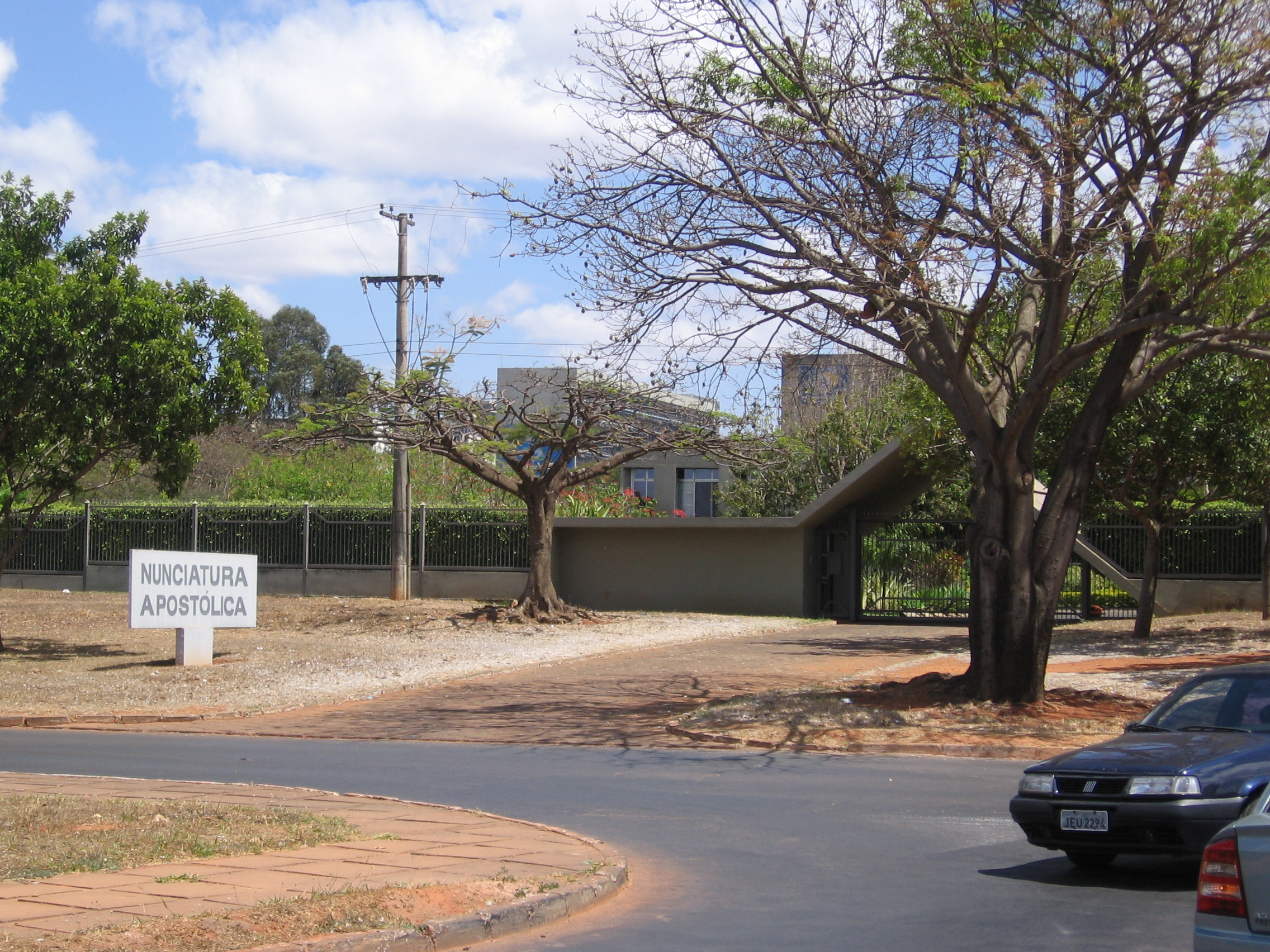
- Location: Brasília
- Apostolic Nuncio: Archbishop Giambattista Diquattro

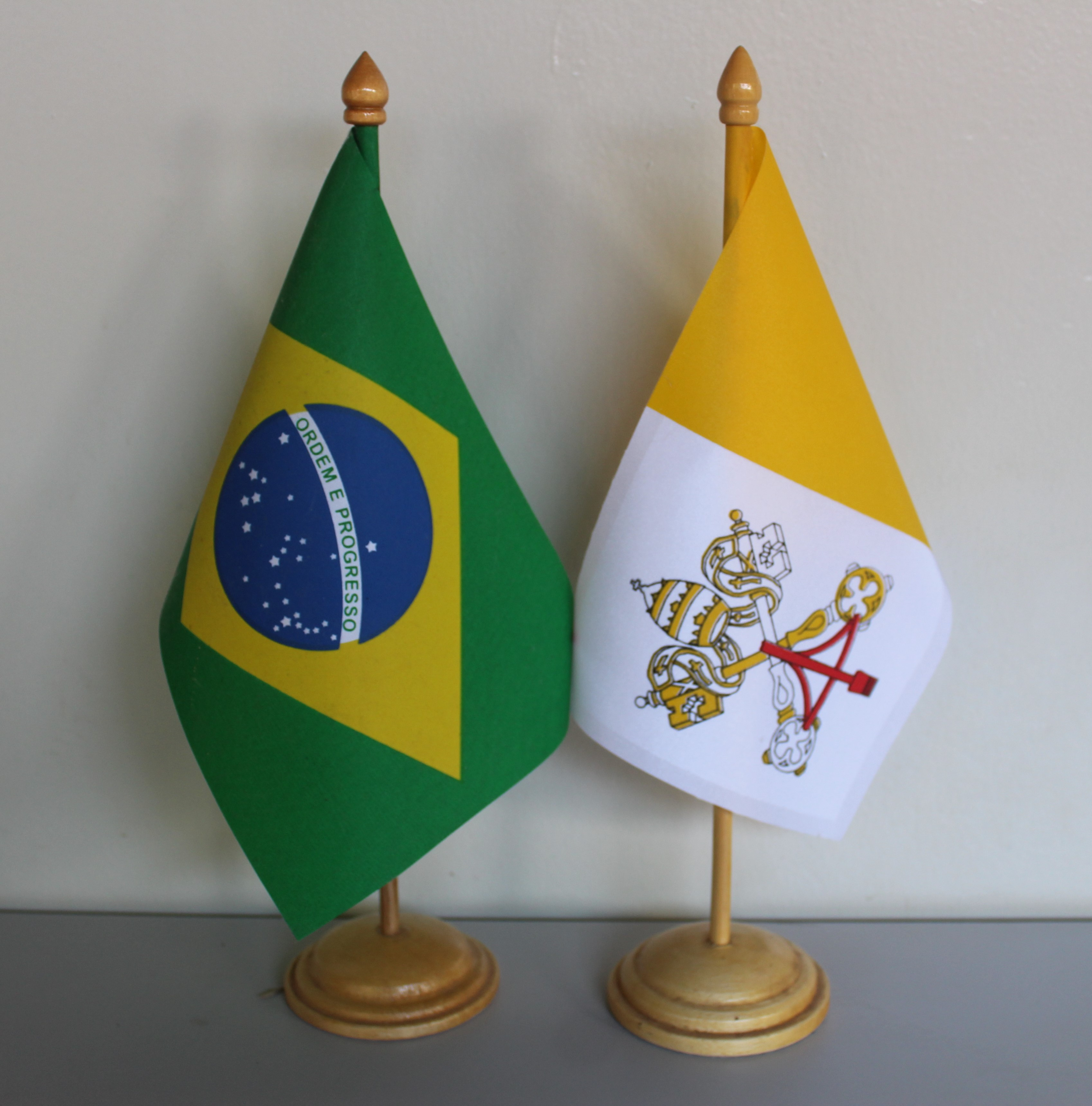
Bilateral flags

The Apostolic Nunciature to the Republic of Brazil is an ecclesiastical office of the Catholic Church in Brazil. It is a diplomatic post of the Holy See, whose representative is called the Apostolic Nuncio with the rank of an ambassador.

== Apostolic Nuncios to Brazil ==
- Pietro Ostini (17 July 1829 – 2 September 1832)
- Gaetano Bedini (28 October 1845 – 16 August 1847)
- Vincentius Massoni (1856–1857)
- Mariano Falcinelli Antoniacci, OSB (30 March 1858 – 14 August 1863)
- Angelo Di Pietro (30 September 1879 – 21 March 1882)
- Mario Mocenni (28 March 1882 – 18 October 1882)
- Vincenzo Vannutelli (22 December 1882 – 4 October 1883)
- Girolamo Maria Gotti, OCD (19 April 1892 – 1 December 1896)
- José Macchi (14 February 1898 – January 1904)
- Giulio Tonti (23 August 1902 – 4 October 1906)
- Alessandro Bavona (10 April 1908 – 1911)
- Giuseppe Aversa (2 March 1911 – 4 December 1916)
- Angelo Giacinto Scapardini, OP (4 December 1916 – 1920)
- Enrico Gasparri (1 September 1920 – 1925)
- Benedetto Aloisi Masella (26 April 1927 – 1946)
- Carlo Chiarlo (19 March 1946 – 24 September 1954)
- Armando Lombardi (24 September 1954 – 4 May 1964)
- Sebastiano Baggio (26 May 1964 – 23 June 1969)
- Umberto Mozzoni (19 April 1969 – 1973)
- Carmine Rocco (22 May 1973 – 12 May 1982)
- Carlo Furno (21 August 1982 – 15 April 1992)
- Alfio Rapisarda (2 June 1992 – 12 October 2002)
- Lorenzo Baldisseri (12 November 2002 – 11 January 2012)
- Giovanni d'Aniello (10 February 2012 – 1 June 2020)
- Giambattista Diquattro (29 August 2020 – present)

== See also ==
- Foreign relations of the Holy See
- List of diplomatic missions of the Holy See
- List of diplomatic missions in Brazil
- Papal visits to Brazil
