= Liberato Tosti =

- Titular Archbishop of Leucas
- Church: Catholic Church
- See: Leucas
- In office: 5 September 1946 – 20 October 1950
- Predecessor: Pierre Chatelus
- Successor: Alfonso Espino y Silva
- Previous posts: Apostolic Nuncio to Honduras & Nicaragua (1948-1949); Apostolic Nuncio to Paraguay (1946-1948); Official to Paraguay (1941-1946)

Orders
- Ordination: 18 April 1908
- Consecration: 3 November 1946 by Giuseppe Fietta

Personal details
- Born: 22 May 1883 Oriolo Romano, Kingdom of Italy
- Died: 20 October 1950 (aged 67) Rome, Italy

Liberato Tosti (22 May 1883 – 20 October 1950) was an Italian prelate of the Catholic Church who served in the diplomatic service of the Holy See. He became an archbishop in 1946 and led the offices representing the Holy See in Paraguay, Nicaragua, and Honduras.

== Biography ==
Liberato Tosti was born on 22 May 1883 in Oriolo Romano, Italy. He was ordained a priest on 18 April 1908.

On 5 September 1946, Pope Pius XII appointed him titular archbishop of Leucas and Apostolic Nuncio to Paraguay. He received his episcopal consecration on 3 November 1946 in Buenos Aires from Archbishop Giuseppe Fietta, Apostolic Nuncio to Argentina.

On 4 October 1948, Pope Pius named him Apostolic Nuncio to both Nicaragua and Honduras.

On 14 April 1950, Pope Pius named him a consultor to the Congregation for Seminaries and University Studies.

He died in Rome on 20 October 1950.
