= Apostolic Nunciature to Paraguay =

Diplomatic Mission of the Holy See

The Apostolic Nunciature to Paraguay is an ecclesiastical office of the Catholic Church in Paraguay. It is a diplomatic post of the Holy See, whose representative is called the Apostolic Nuncio with the rank of an ambassador.

== List of papal representatives ==
Apostolic Delegates

- Vincenzo Massoni (26 September 1856 – 3 June 1857)
- Marino Marini (14 August 1857 – 27 March 1865)
- Angelo Di Pietro (31 December 1877 – 30 September 1879)
- Luigi Matera (19 September 1879 – 14 October 1884)
- Antonio Sabatucci (24 October 1900 – 9 November 1906)

Apostolic Internuncios

- Alberto Vassallo di Torregrossa (5 January 1920 – 14 July 1922)
  - Title is Nuncio as of 6 August 1920

Apostolic Nuncios

- Beda Giovanni Cardinale (16 October 1922 – 29 August 1925)
- Filippo Cortesi (14 June 1928 – 4 June 1936)
- Giuseppe Fietta (11 December 1936 – 12 November 1939)
- Albert Levame (12 November 1939 – 17 December 1941)
- Liberato Tosti (5 September 1946 – 4 October 1948)
- Federico Lunardi (8 July 1949 – 9 November 1954)
- Luigi Punzolo (7 December 1954 – 12 December 1957)
- Carlo Martini (25 March 1958 – 29 November 1963)
- Vittore Ugo Righi (1 February 1964 – 1967)
- Antonio Innocenti (15 December 1967 – 26 February 1973)
- Joseph Mees (11 July 1973 – 19 January 1985)
- Giorgio Zur (3 May 1985 – 13 August 1990)
- José Sebastián Laboa Gallego (21 August 1990 – 18 March 1995)
- Lorenzo Baldisseri (6 April 1995 – 19 June 1999)
- Antonio Lucibello (27 July 1999 – 27 August 2005)
- Orlando Antonini (16 November 2005 – 8 August 2009)
- Eliseo Antonio Ariotti (5 November 2009 – 29 December 2023)
- Vincenzo Turturro (29 December 2023 – present)

== See also ==
- Foreign relations of the Holy See
- List of heads of the diplomatic missions of the Holy See
