= Apostolic Nunciature to Panama =

Diplomatic Mission of the Holy See

The Apostolic Nunciature to Panama is an ecclesiastical office of the Catholic Church in Panama. It is a diplomatic post of the Holy See, whose representative is called the Apostolic Nuncio with the rank of an ambassador. The nuncio resides in Panama City.

== List of papal representatives to Panama ==
Apostolic Internuncios to Central America

- Angelo Rotta (21 September 1923 – 6 June 1925)

Apostolic Nuncios

- Carlo Chiarlo (30 September 1933 – 1940)
- Luigi Centoz (3 December 1941 – 26 April 1952)
- Paul Bernier (7 August 1952 – 9 September 1957)
- Luigi Punzolo (12 December 1957 – 1961)
- Antonino Pinci (31 October 1961 – 1971)
- Edoardo Rovida (31 July 1971 – 13 August 1977)
- Blasco Francisco Collaço (23 September 1977 – 26 July 1982)
- José Sebastián Laboa Gallego (18 December 1982 – 21 August 1990)
- Osvaldo Padilla (17 December 1990 – 1994)
- Bruno Musarò (3 December 1994 – 25 September 1999)
- Giacomo Guido Ottonello (29 November 1999 – 26 February 2005)
- Giambattista Diquattro (2 April 2005 – 21 November 2008)
- Andrés Carrascosa Coso (12 January 2009 – 22 June 2017)
- Mirosław Adamczyk (12 August 2017 – 22 February 2020)
- Luciano Russo (22 August 2020 – 18 December 2021)
- Dagoberto Campos Salas (14 May 2022 – 1 May 2026)
