= Vincenzo Turturro =

Papal nuncio (b. 1978)

His Excellency, The Most Reverend Vincenzo Turturro
- Apostolic Nuncio to Paraguay; Titular Archbishop of Ravello
- Appointed: 29 December 2023
- Predecessor: Eliseo Antonio Ariotti
- Other post: Titular Archbishop of Ravello

Orders
- Ordination: 31 October 2003
- Consecration: 9 March 2024 by Pietro Parolin, Paul Gallagher, and Domenico Cornacchia

Personal details
- Born: 7 October 1978 (age 47) Bisceglie, Bari, Italy
- Motto: Quoniam Tu Mecum Es
- Coat of arms

Styles of Vincenzo Turturro
- Reference style: His Excellency; The Most Reverend
- Spoken style: Your Excellency
- Religious style: Archbishop

Vincenzo Turturro (born 7 October 1978) is an Italian prelate of the Catholic Church who works in the diplomatic service of the Holy See.

== Biography ==
Vincenzo Turturro was born on 7 October 1978 in Bisceglie, Bari, Italy. He was ordained a priest for the Diocese of Molfetta-Ruvo-Giovinazzo-Terlizzi on 31 October 2003.

== Diplomatic career ==
He entered the Holy See diplomatic service on 1 July 2009. His diplomatic service includes assignments in the Apostolic Nunciatures in Zimbabwe (2009-2012) and Nicaragua (2012). In 2015, he moved to the Nunciature in Argentina before being appointed to the Section for Relations with States in the Secretariat of State and International Organizations in 2019. Since 1 August 2019, he has served as the personal secretary to Cardinal Secretary of State Pietro Parolin. He is fluent in English and Spanish.

On 29 December 2023, Pope Francis appointed him Titular Archbishop of Ravello and Apostolic Nuncio to Paraguay. On 9 March 2024, Turturro was consecrated as an archbishop.

== See also ==
- List of heads of the diplomatic missions of the Holy See
