= Egidio Lari =

Italian prelate

Egidio Lari (8 March 1882 – 17 November 1965) was an Italian prelate of the Catholic Church who worked in the diplomatic service of the Holy See.

Egidio Lari was born in Buggiano, in the Province of Pistoia, Italy, on 8 March 1882. He was ordained a priest on 18 September 1909.

On 29 June 1931, Pope Pius XI named him a titular archbishop and Apostolic Delegate to Iran. He received his episcopal consecration on 15 August from Cardinal Luigi Sincero. He returned to Rome in March 1936.

On 11 May 1939, Pope Pius appointed him to be Apostolic Nuncio to Bolivia.

He retired from that post on 3 January 1945.

He died on 17 November 1965 at the age of 86.
