= Ubaldo Calabresi =

Italian Catholic bishop

- Apostolic Nuncio to Argentina
- See: Fundi
- Appointed: 23 January 1981
- Term ended: 4 March 2000
- Predecessor: Pio Laghi
- Successor: Santos Abril y Castelló
- Other post: Titular Archbishop of Fundi
- Previous posts: Apostolic Delegate to Sudan (1969–1972); Apostolic Pro-Nuncio to Sudan (1972–1978); Apostolic Nuncio to Venezuela (1978–1981)

Orders
- Ordination: 27 March 1948
- Consecration: 28 September 1969 by Jean-Marie Villot

Personal details
- Born: 2 January 1925 Sezze Romano, Italy
- Died: 14 June 2004 (aged 79)
- Denomination: Roman Catholic

Ordination history of Ubaldo Calabresi
History
Episcopal consecration
- Principal consecrator: Jean-Marie Villot
- Co-consecrators: Sergio Pignedoli, Arrigo Pintonello
Episcopal succession
Bishops consecrated by Ubaldo Calabresi as principal consecrator
- Gabriel Dwatuka Wagi: 13 June 1976
- José Vicente Conejero Gallego: 19 March 1997

Ubaldo Calabresi (2 January 1925 – 14 June 2004) was an Italian Catholic bishop.

== Biography ==
Calabresi was born on 2 January 1925 in Sezze Romano, Italy, the fourth of six brothers. He earned degrees in civil and canon law at the Lateran University. He was ordained a priest there on 27 March 1948.

To prepare for a diplomatic career he entered the Pontifical Ecclesiastical Academy in 1951.

On 3 July 1969 he was named Titular Bishop of Fundi and Apostolic Delegate to the Red Sea Region. He was consecrated on 28 September 1969 by Vatican Secretary of State Cardinal Jean-Marie Villot.

He was named Apostolic Nuncio to Venezuela on 5 January 1978.

He was appointed Apostolic Nuncio to Argentina in 1981.

On 27 June 1992 he was a co-consecrator when Jorge Mario Bergoglio, later Pope Francis, was made a bishop.

He was a participant in the successful Vatican mediation between Argentina and Chile over the Beagle conflict.

He retired on 4 March 2000. He suffered from Parkinson's disease and died in Rome on 14 June 2004.

Diplomatic posts
Preceded by Giovanni Mariani	Apostolic Nuncio to Venezuela; 5 January 1978 – 23 January 1981	Succeeded by Luciano Storero
Preceded by Pio Laghi	Apostolic Nuncio to Argentina; 23 January 1981 – 4 March 2000	Succeeded by Santos Abril y Castelló
