= Armando Lombardi =

Italian prelate

- Apostolic Nuncio to Brazil
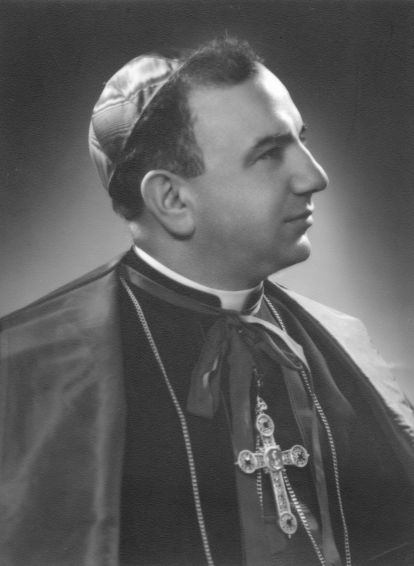
- In office: 24 September 1954 – 4 May 1964
- Predecessor: Carlo Chiarlo
- Successor: Sebastiano Baggio
- Other post: Titular Archbishop of Caesarea Philippi (1950-1964)
- Previous post: Apostolic Nuncio to Venezuela (1950-1954)

Orders
- Ordination: 22 July 1928
- Consecration: 16 April 1950 by Clemente Micara

Personal details
- Born: 12 May 1905 Cercepiccola, Kingdom of Italy
- Died: 4 May 1964 (aged 58) Rio de Janeiro, Brazil

Armando Lombardi (12 May 1905 – 4 May 1964) was an Italian prelate of the Catholic Church who served in the diplomatic service of the Holy See, including ten years as Apostolic Nuncio to Brazil.

== Biography ==
Armando Lombardi was born on 12 May 1905 in Cercepiccola, Italy. He was ordained a priest on 22 July 1928. He earned degrees in theology, philosophy and canon law. He was vice rector of the diocesan seminary of Campobasso from 1928 to 1934. He moved to Rome in 1934 and joined the staff of the Congregation for Seminaries.

To prepare for a diplomatic career he entered the Pontifical Ecclesiastical Academy in 1934. He assignments took him to Chile and Colombia. In 1940 he returned to Rome to work at the Secretariat of State and teach at the Ecclesiastical Academy.

On 13 February 1950, Pope Pius XII named him titular archbishop of Caesarea Philippi and Apostolic Nuncio to Venezuela.

He received his episcopal consecration on 16 April 1950 from Cardinal Clemente Micara.

On 24 September 1954, Pope Pius appointed him Apostolic Nuncio to Brazil. In Brazil he was energetic in creating new dioceses and other jurisdictions and in overseeing their staffing with a new generation of leaders attuned to the style and mission of Popes John XXIII and Paul VI. He was also an enthusiastic supporter of the nascent National Bishops Conference of Brazil.

He died in Rio de Janeiro on 4 May 1964 at the age of 58.
