= Angelo Accattino =

Italian prelate and diplomat of the Catholic Church

His Excellency, The Most Reverend Angelo Accattino
- Apostolic Nuncio to Colombia; Titular Archbishop of Sebana
- Appointed: 15 August 2026
- Predecessor: Paolo Rudelli
- Other post: Titular Archbishop of Sebana
- Previous posts: Apostolic Nuncio to Tanzania (2023-2026); Apostolic Nuncio to Bolivia (2017-2023)

Orders
- Ordination: 25 June 1994 by Carlo Cavalla
- Consecration: 25 November 2017 by Pietro Parolin, Gianni Sacchi, and Alceste Catella

Personal details
- Born: July 31, 1966 (age 60) Asti, Italy
- Motto: Ad Vesperum De Amore Iudicabimur
- Coat of arms

Styles of Angelo Accattino
- Reference style: His Excellency; The Most Reverend
- Spoken style: Your Excellency
- Religious style: Archbishop

Angelo Accattino (born 31 July 1966) is an Italian prelate of the Catholic Church who works in the diplomatic service of the Holy See.

== Biography ==
Angelo Accattino was born on 31 July 1966 in Asti, Italy. He studied at the seminary in Casale and was ordained a priest of the Diocese of Casale Monferrato on 25 June 1994. He holds a doctorate in canon law.

== Diplomatic career ==
He studied at the Pontifical Ecclesiastical Academy and entered the diplomatic service of the Holy See on 1 July 1999 and filled assignments in Trinidad and Tobago, Colombia, and Peru; in Rome in the offices of the Secretariat of State; and in the United States and Turkey.

On 12 September 2017, Pope Francis appointed him Titular Archbishop of Sebana and the Apostolic Nuncio to Bolivia. He received his episcopal consecration from Cardinal Pietro Parolin on 25 November 2017 in Calliano.

On 2 January 2023, Pope Francis appointed him as nuncio to Tanzania.

On 15 August 2026, Pope Leo XIV appointed him as nuncio to Colombia.

== See also ==
- List of heads of the diplomatic missions of the Holy See
