= Giuseppe Fietta =

Italian prelate

His Eminence Giuseppe Fietta
- Apostolic Nuncio Emeritus to Italy
- Church: Roman Catholic Church
- Appointed: 26 January 1953
- Term ended: 15 December 1958
- Predecessor: Francesco Borgongini Duca
- Successor: Carlo Grano
- Other post: Cardinal-Priest of San Paolo alla Regola "pro hac vice" (1958–60)
- Previous posts: Titular Archbishop of Serdica (1926–58); Apostolic Internuncio to Central America (1926–30); Apostolic Nuncio to Haiti (1930–36); Apostolic Nuncio to the Dominican Republic (1930–36); Apostolic Nuncio to Paraguay (1936–39); Apostolic Nuncio to Argentina (1936–53)

Orders
- Ordination: 4 November 1906
- Consecration: 10 October 1926 by Giovanni Vincenzo Bonzano
- Created cardinal: 15 December 1958 by Pope John XXIII
- Rank: Cardinal-Priest

Personal details
- Born: Giuseppe Fietta; 6 November 1883 Ivrea, Kingdom of Italy
- Died: 1 October 1960 (aged 76) Ivrea, Italy
- Buried: Ivrea Cathedral
- Education: Pontifical Gregorian University
- Motto: Fiat pax in virtute tua
- Coat of arms

Styles of Giuseppe Fietta
- Reference style: His Eminence
- Spoken style: Your Eminence
- Informal style: Cardinal
- See: none

Giuseppe Fietta (6 November 1883 – 1 October 1960) was an Italian prelate of the Catholic Church who worked in the diplomatic service of the Holy See from 1924 to 1958, including a stint as Apostolic Nuncio to Argentina from 1936 to 1953. He was made a cardinal in 1958.

== Biography ==
Born in Ivrea, Piedmont, Giuseppe Fietta studied at the Pontifical Gregorian University in Rome and was ordained to the priesthood on 4 November 1906. He then served as private secretary to the bishop of Alghero, Oristano, and Cagliari until 1923. Fietta was raised to the rank of Domestic Prelate of His Holiness on 9 May 1920 and served as the rector of the Seminary of Alghero and a canon of its cathedral chapter from 1923 to 1924. Joining the diplomatic service of the Holy See, he worked as secretary of the Nunciature to Costa Rica and in 1925 became chargé d'affaires there.

On 30 March 1926, Pope Pius XI appointed Fietta Titular Archbishop of Serdica and, on 8 July, Apostolic Internuncio to Central America.

He received his episcopal consecration on 10 October that year from Cardinal Giovanni Bonzano in Sacro Cuore di Gesù a Castro Pretorio in Rome.

Fietta was named Nuncio to Haiti and to the Dominican Republic on 18 October 1930. He was replaced in those nunciatures by Maurilio Silvani on 24 July 1936. His term in the Dominican Republic coincided with the first presidency–and the first stages of the dictatorship–of Rafael Trujillo, to whom Fietta was politically sympathetic.

Pope Pius XI appointed him Nuncio to Argentina on 12 August 1936 and Apostolic Nuncio to Paraguay on 11 December 1936, though the latter appointment only lasted until he was replaced in Paraguay by Albert Levame on 12 November 1939, while his Argentina posting lasted until 1953.

Pope Pius XII named him Nuncio to Italy on 26 January 1953, a post he held until he became a cardinal in 1958. He attempted to have diplomatic relations established between the Vatican and the Soviet Union.

Pope John XXIII created him Cardinal-Priest of San Paolo alla Regola in the consistory of 15 December 1958. Following the ancient custom revived by Pope Pius, Fietta received his cardinal's red biretta from Giovanni Gronchi, President of Italy, on 17 December.

In retirement, he enjoyed strolling the streets of his native Ivrea and playing bocce with his friends.

Fietta died in Ivrea, at age 76, and is buried at its cathedral.

== See also ==
- Cardinals created by John XXIII

Catholic Church titles
Preceded by Angelo Rotta	Nuncio to Central America; 27 September 1926 – 23 September 1930	Succeeded by Carlo Chiarlo
Preceded by George Caruana	Nuncio to Haiti and the Dominican Republic; 23 September 1930 – 20 June 1936	Succeeded by Maurilio Silvani
Preceded by Filippo Cortesi	Apostolic Nuncio to Argentina; 20 June 1936 – 26 January 1953	Succeeded by Mario Zanin
Preceded by Francesco Borgongini Duca	Nuncio to Italy; 26 January 1953 – 15 December 1958	Succeeded by Carlo Grano
