= Apostolic Nunciature to Bolivia =

Diplomatic Mission of the Holy See in Bolivia

- Location: La Paz, Bolivia.
- Address: San Jorge Av. Arce 2990, Casilla: 136, La Paz, Bolivia.
- Apostolic Nuncio: Archbishop Fermín Emilio Sosa Rodríguez

The Apostolic Nunciature to Bolivia the diplomatic mission of the Holy See to Bolivia. It is located in La Paz. The current Apostolic Nuncio to Bolivia is Angelo Accattino, who was appointed by Pope Francis on 12 September 2017.

The Apostolic Nunciature to Republic of Bolivia is an ecclesiastical office of the Catholic Church in Bolivia, with the rank of an embassy. The nuncio serves both as the ambassador of the Holy See to the President of Bolivia, and as delegate and point-of-contact between the Catholic hierarchy in Bolivia and the Pope.

== History ==
Papal representation was established in Bolivia by the Apostolic Delegation to Peru and Bolivia, a single office resident in Peru. As a delegation, it had no diplomatic status but acted on behalf of the Holy See with respect to the Catholic Church in region. This was then divided to create a nunciature for each country, a diplomatic office. Archbishop Angelo Giacinto Scapardini was named Apostolic Delegate to Peru and Bolivia in 1910. When he was assigned to his next diplomatic post in December 1916, he was described as Internuncio to Peru and Bolivia. Apostolic internuncio is a title given in anticipation of the establishment of diplomatic relations and the exchange of ambassadors.

== Papal representatives to Bolivia ==
Apostolic Delegates to Peru and Bolivia

- Serafino Vannutelli (23 July 1869 – 10 September 1875)
- Mario Mocenni (14 August 1877 – 28 March 1882)
- Cesare Sambucetti (18 April 1882 – 1883)
- Beniamino Cavicchioni (21 March 1884 – 1898)
- Pietro Gasparri (2 January 1898 – 25 April 1901)
- Alessandro Bavona (17 July 1901 – 13 November 1906)
- Angelo Maria Dolci (7 December 1906 – September 1910)
- Angelo Giacinto Scapardini (23 September 1910 – 4 December 1916)
  - His title became Apostolic Internuncio to Peru and Bolivia during his tenure as delegate.

Apostolic Internuncios to Bolivia

- Rodolfo Caroli (28 April 1917 - 25 January 1921)
- Tito Trocchi (25 May 1921 - 11 January 1927)
- Gaetano Cicognani (10 January 1925 - 15 June 1928)

Apostolic Nuncios to Bolivia

- Carlo Chiarlo (12 November 1928 - 7 January 1932)
- Luigi Centoz (28 January 1932 - 16 September 1936)
- Federico Lunardi (13 December 1936 - 31 October 1938 )
- Egidio Lari (11 May 1939 – 3 January 1945)
- Giuseppe Burzio (2 May 1946 - 18 December 1950)
- Sergio Pignedoli (22 December 1950 - 19 October 1954)
- Umberto Mozzoni (13 November 1954 - 20 September 1958)
- Carmine Rocco (5 October 1961 - 16 September 1967)
- Giovanni Gravelli (24 December 1967 - 12 July 1973)
- Giuseppe Laigueglia (3 August 1973 - 20 January 1979)
- Alfio Rapisarda (22 April 1979 - 29 January 1985)
- Santos Abril y Castelló (29 April 1985 - 2 October 1989)
- Giovanni Tonucci (21 October 1989 - 9 March 1996)
- Rino Passigato (18 March 1996 - 17 July 1999)
- Józef Wesołowski (3 November 1999 - 16 February 2002)
- Ivo Scapolo (26 March 2002 - 17 January 2008)
- Luciano Suriani (22 February 2008 - 21 November 2008)
- Giambattista Diquattro (21 November 2008 - 21 January 2017)
- Angelo Accattino (12 September 2017 – 2 January 2023)
- Fermín Emilio Sosa Rodríguez (17 November 2023 – present)
