= Giovanni Battista Marenco =

Italian prelate

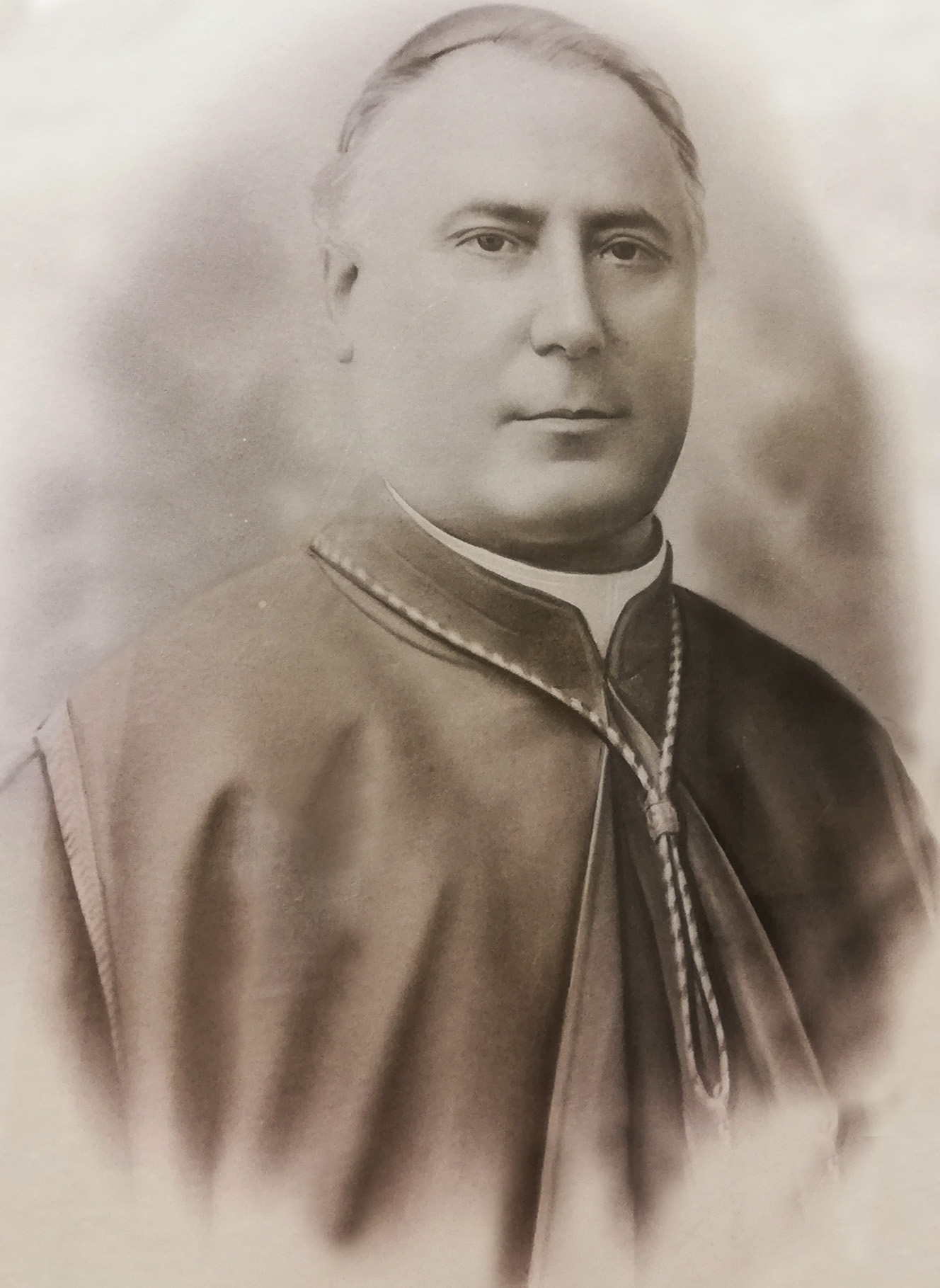

Giovanni Battista Marenco SDB, more often known as Giovanni Marenco (Note: The AAS gives his name as Giovanni Battista Marenco only once.) (27 April 1853 – 22 October 1921) was an Italian prelate of the Catholic Church who worked in the Roman Curia, led an Italian diocese briefly, and then joined the diplomatic service of the Holy See.

== Biography ==
Giovanni Marenco was born on 27 April 1853 in Ovada, Italy. He joined the Salesians of Don Bosco in 1873 and was ordained a priest as a member of that order on 18 December 1875. He headed various Salesian houses and in 1890 he was appointed provincial of the Ligurian province. In 1892 he served as the rector major's delegate to the Salesian Sisters. In 1899 he was named procurator general of the order.

He was attached to the Congregation of the Council and a consultor to the Congregation for Religious when, on 29 April 1909, Pope Pius X named him Bishop of Massa Carrara. He received his episcopal consecration on 16 May 1909 from Cardinal Francesco di Paolo Satolli.

On 7 January 1917, Pope Benedict XV appointed him titular archbishop of Edessa in Macedonia, and on 2 February he was named Apostolic Internuncio to Costa Rica, Honduras, and Nicaragua, (Note: The AAS also describes him as "Apostolic Delegate to Central America" when reporting the events of a consistory held on 22 March 1917. See other references on 16 February 1921.) (Note: One source reports he was also appointed Apostolic Delegate to Guatemala and El Salvador on 15 September 1920. Online databases differ. The official source, the Acta Apostolicae Sedis (AAS) does not record this appointment, nor do Salesian sources. AAS identifies Marenco upon his death only as "Apostolic Internuncio to Costa Rica, Nicaragua and Honduras".)

Marenco returned to Italy because of illness and died in Turin on 22 October 1921 at the age of 68.
