= Olmedo Canton, Loja =

Olmedo Canton
- Canton
- Location of Loja Province in Ecuador

- Olmedo Canton in Loja Province
- Coordinates: 3.934°S 79.648°W
- Country: Ecuador
- Province: Loja Province
- Time zone: UTC-5 (ECT)

Olmedo Canton is a canton of Ecuador, located in the Loja Province. Its capital is the town of Olmedo. Its population at the 2001 census was 5,707.
