= Felice Pirozzi =

Italian prelate

Felice Pirozzi (19 October 1908 – 25 July 1975) was an Italian prelate of the Catholic Church who worked in the diplomatic service of the Holy See. He headed its school for training members of its diplomatic corps from 1970 to 1975.

== Biography ==
Felice Pirozzi was born on 19 October 1908 in Pomigliano d'Arco, Province of Naples, Italy. He was ordained a priest on 19 July 1931.

In preparation for a career in the diplomatic service, he entered the Pontifical Ecclesiastical Academy in 1932. His early assignments included service as Permanent Observer of the Holy See to UNESCO in Paris that began with his appointment on 26 June 1955 and a stint with the delegation to Vietnam and Cambodia in the 1960s.

On 23 September 1960, Pope John XXIII named him titular archbishop of Gratiana and Apostolic Delegate to Madagascar, the first diplomat the Holy See assigned to that country. He received his episcopal consecration from Cardinal Laurean Rugambwa on December 31.

Pirozzi participated in the first, second and fourth sessions of the Second Vatican Council.

Pope Paul VI appointed him Apostolic Nuncio to Venezuela on 9 January 1967.

On 17 October 1970, Pirozzi became president of the Pontifical Ecclesiastical Academy, the Holy See's centre for training its diplomats. Beginning in 1974, his duties were handed over to Archbishop Domenico Enrici as temporary president. Pirozzi died on 25 July 1975.
