= Giovanni Cagliero =

Italian prelate and missionary

His Eminence Giovanni Cagliero S.D.B.
- Cardinal-Bishop of Frascati
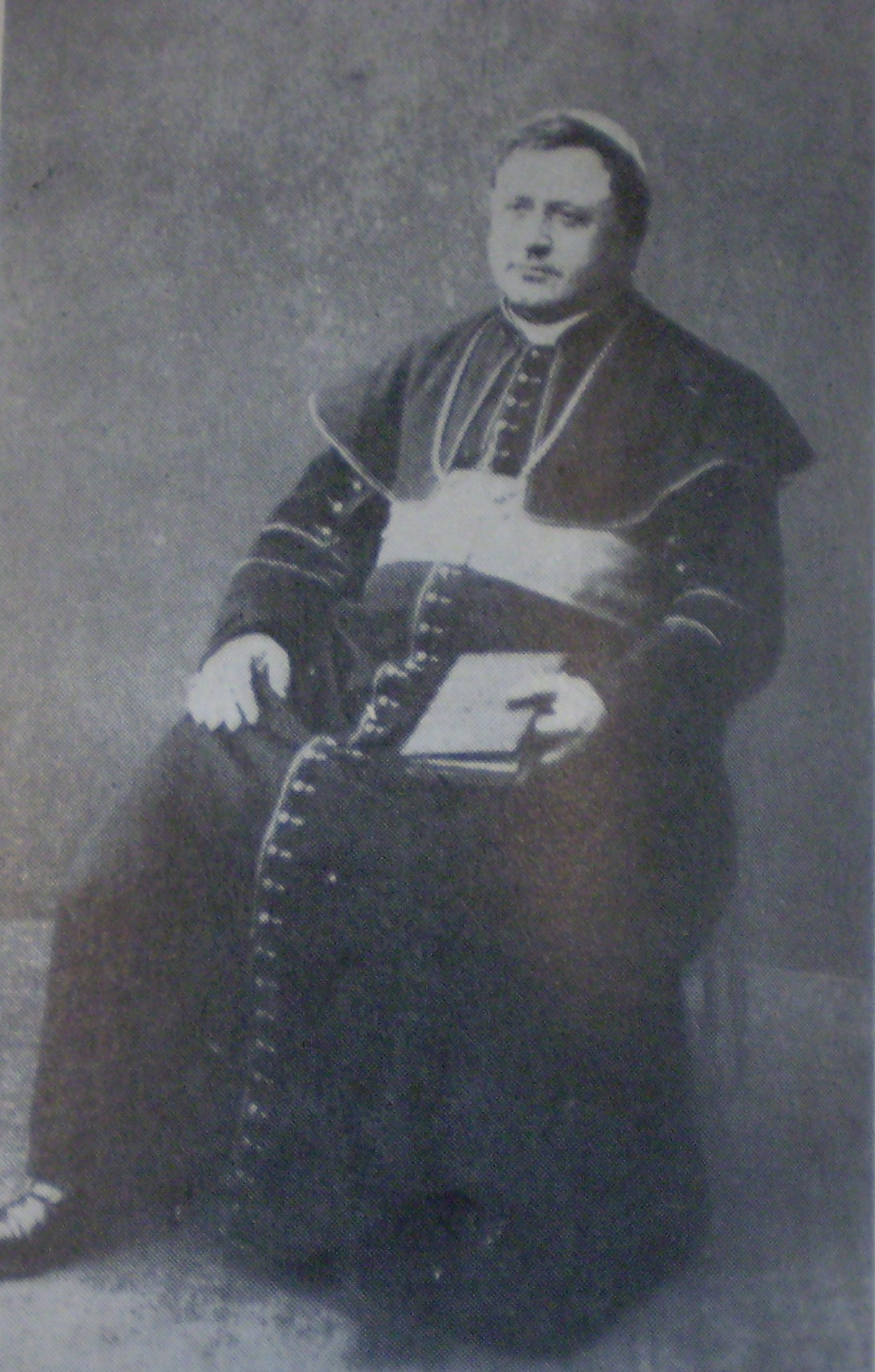
- Church: Roman Catholic Church
- Appointed: 16 December 1920
- Installed: 16 January 1921
- Term ended: 2 1926
- Predecessor: Giulio Boschi
- Successor: Michele Lega
- Previous posts: Vicar Apostolic of Northern Patagonia (1884-1904); Titular Bishop of Magyddus (1884-1904); Titular Archbishop of Sebastia (1904-15); Apostolic Delegate to Costa Rica (1908-15); Apostolic Delegate to Nicaragua (1908-15); Apostolic Delegate to Honduras (1908-15); Cardinal-Priest of San Bernardo alle Terme (1915-20)

Orders
- Ordination: 14 June 1862
- Consecration: 7 December 1884 by Gaetano Alimonda
- Created cardinal: 6 December 1915 by Pope Benedict XV
- Rank: Cardinal-Priest (1915-20); Cardinal-Bishop (1920-26)

Personal details
- Born: Giovanni Cagliero; 11 January 1838 Castelnuovo d'Asti, Turin, Kingdom of Sardinia
- Died: 28 February 1926 (aged 88) Rome, Kingdom of Italy
- Parents: Pietro Cagliero; Teresa Musso
- Education: University of Turin
- Motto: Recto fixus calliero
- Coat of arms

Styles of Giovanni Cagliero
- Reference style: His Eminence
- Spoken style: Your Eminence
- Informal style: Cardinal
- See: Frascati (suburbicarian)

Giovanni Cagliero SDB (11 January 1838 – 28 February 1926) was an Italian prelate of the Catholic Church who worked as a missionary in South America and served as Apostolic Delegate to Costa Rica, Honduras, and Nicaragua from 1908 to 1915 when he was elevated to the rank of cardinal.

A member of the Salesians, he was the first member of that order to become a bishop and the first to be made a cardinal.

== Biography ==
Cagliero was born in Castelnuovo d'Asti on 11 January 1838 and studied at its seminary and later the University of Turin. He entered the Pious Society of St. Francis de Sales, more commonly known as the Salesians, in 1851. He received the clerical habit from St. John Bosco himself and was reputed to be his favorite pupil. Cagliero was also a classmate of St Dominic Savio and Bl. Michael Rua.

He was ordained to the priesthood on 14 June 1862, and then taught at the Salesian House of Studies in Turin until 1875. Cagliero led the first ten Salesians to America and established five houses in Uruguay and Argentina between 1875 and 1877, after which he became spiritual director of his society and the first General Director of Daughters of Mary Help of Christians in Turin. He was made Pro-Apostolic Vicar of new vicariate in Northern Patagonia, in Argentina, on 20 November 1883.

On 30 October 1884, Cagliero was appointed Titular Bishop of Magydus by Pope Leo XIII, receiving his episcopal consecration on the following December 7 from Cardinal Gaetano Alimonda. After being promoted to Titular Archbishop of Sebastea on 24 March 1904, he served as Apostolic Visitor to the dioceses of Bobbio, Piacenza, Savona, and Tortona in 1904.

Cagliero was named Apostolic Delegate to Costa Rica on 10 June 1908, to Honduras on 19 December, and to Nicaragua on 26 December.

Pope Benedict XV made him Cardinal-Priest of San Bernardo alle Terme in the consistory of 6 December 1915. Cagliero opted for the order of Cardinal-Bishop and assumed the suburbicarian see of Frascati on 16 December 1920.

He was one of the cardinal electors who participated in the 1922 papal conclave, which elected Pope Pius XI.

=== Death and memory ===
Cardinal Cagliero died in Rome on 28 February 1926 at the age of 88. He was initially buried in the sepulchre of the Sacred Congregation for the Propagation of the Faith in Campo Verano cemetery, but his remains were transferred in 1964 to Mater Misericordiae Cathedral in Viedma.
