= Roman Catholic Archdiocese of Chersonesus in Zechia =

Roman Catholic titular see

The Roman Catholic Archdiocese of Chersonesus in Zechia, is a titular diocese formerly based in Sevastapol, Crimea.

In 1333, a Latin Church diocese of Chersonesus was established, but it appears that it had only a bishop, a Dominican called Richard the Englishman.

No longer a residential diocese, Chersonesus in Zechia is today listed by the Catholic Church as a titular archbishopric, since the early 20th century, originally called Cherson(a) or Chersonesus, since 1933 specifically Chersonesus in Zechia, avoiding confusion with other sees called Chersonesus (notably in Crete) by specifying it is Crimean.

It has been vacant for decades, having had the following incumbents, all of the intermediary (archiepiscopal) rank:

- Donald Louis Mackintosh (1912.06.11 – 1919.10.08)
- Alexis-Armand Charost (1920.06.15 – 1921.09.22) as Coadjutor Archbishop of Rennes (1920.06.15 – 1921.09.22), succeeding as Metropolitan Archbishop of Rennes (Brittany, France) (1921.09.22 – 1930.11.07), created Cardinal-Priest of S. Maria della Vittoria (1922.12.14 – 1930.11.07); previously Titular Bishop of Miletopolis (1913.02.14 – 1913.11.21) & Auxiliary Bishop of Cambrai (France) (1913.02.14 – 1913.11.21), then Bishop of Lille (France) (1913.11.21 – 1920.06.15)
- Beda Giovanni Cardinale, Benedictine Order (O.S.B.) (1922.07.25 – 1933.12.01)
- Albert Levame (1933.12.21 – 1958.12.05)
- Louis Parisot, Society of African Missions (S.M.A.) (1960.01.14 – 1960.04.21)
- Serapione Uluhogian, Mechitarists (C.A.M.) (1960.07.22 – 1965.05.16)
- Hemaiagh Guédiguian, C.A.M. (1971.03.03 – 1976.07.03), later Patriarch of Cilicia of the Armenians (Lebanon) ([1976.07.03] 1976.07.05 – retired 1982.05.30), President of Synod of the Armenian Catholic Church (1976.07.05 – 1982.05.30)
