= Giuseppe Misuraca =

Italian prelate (1884–1962)

Giuseppe Misuraca (28 February 1884 – 4 June 1962) was an Italian prelate of the Catholic Church who worked in the diplomatic service of the Holy See and served as Apostolic Nuncio to Venezuela from 1941 to 1949.

== Biography ==
Giuseppe Misuraca was born on 28 February 1884 in Cefalù, Sicily, Italy. He was ordained a priest on 18 April 1908. In his diaries, Angelo Roncalli, the future Pope John XXIII described him as "my dear friend from the Seminary".

To prepare for a diplomatic career he entered the Pontifical Ecclesiastical Academy in 1908. His work in the diplomatic service of the Holy See included a posting in the United States where he was promoted from second class to first class secretary in 1913 As World War II was starting he was counselor at the nunciature in Italy.

On 2 July 1941, Pope Pius XII named him Apostolic Nuncio to Venezuela and titular archbishop of Caesarea in Cappadocia. He received his episcopal consecration on 20 July 1941 from Cardinal Luigi Maglione.

He resigned in March 1949 at the age of 65.

Misuraca died on 4 June 1962 at the age of 78.
