= Angelo Giacinto Scapardini =

Roman Catholic diplomat

Angelo Giacinto Scapardini O.P.
- Archbishop-Bishop of Vigevano
- Church: Catholic Church
- Diocese: Diocese of Vigevano
- In office: 27 August 1921 – 18 May 1937
- Predecessor: Pietro Berruti
- Successor: Giovanni Bargiggia
- Previous posts: Titular Archbishop of Damascus (1910-1921); Apostolic Nuncio to Brazil (1916-1920); Apostolic Delegate to Peru & Bolivia (1910-1916); Titular Archbishop of Antiochia in Pisidia (1910); Bishop of Nusco (1909-1910)

Orders
- Ordination: 20 September 1884
- Consecration: 6 June 1909 by Agostino Richelmy

Personal details
- Born: 22 December 1861 Miasino, Province of Novara, Kingdom of Italy
- Died: 18 May 1937 (aged 75) Vigevano, Province of Pavia, Kingdom of Italy

Angelo Giacinto Scapardini, O.P. (22 December 1861 – 18 May 1937) was an Italian prelate of the Catholic Church who spent a decade preaching throughout Italy, then served as a papal diplomat in Latin America for ten years, and ended his career leading the Diocese of Vigevano from 1921 to 1937.

== Biography ==
Angelo Giacinto Scapardini was born on 22 December 1861 in Miasino, Italy. He was ordained a priest of the Diocese of Novara on 20 September 1884. He became rector of the Novara seminary. He joined the Dominicans on 25 October 1899 and preached throughout Italy with great success.

On 29 April 1909, Pope Pius X named him Bishop of Nusco. He received his episcopal consecration in the church of San Domenico in Turin on 6 June 1909 and was installed on 31 October.

On 23 September 1910, he was named titular archbishop of Damascus and Apostolic Delegate to Peru and Bolivia, a single title. (Note: On 10 September 1910 he had been appointed titular archbishop of Antiochia in Pisidia. The 23 September assignment to Damascus is recorded as a change: "mutato titulo Antiocheno iam eidem adsignato".) The Delegation was based in Peru and like his predecessors Scapardini visited Bolivia rarely.

In Peru he was tasked with a program of ecclesiastical reform, beginning with an episcopal assembly in 1911, the erection of a central seminary in Lima, and standards for clerical behavior and education. He also had to contend with the government's pressure to create a new diocese to promote its claims in a territorial disputed with Colombia. In Bolivia, he managed difficult relations with the government over religious freedom, the separation of church and state, as well as the Bolivian president's assertion of its traditional Patronato rights, inherited from colonial Spain, to control Church appointments. Scapardini recommended the appointment of a representative of the Holy See at the level of nuncio. His argument was successful. When he received his next diplomatic assignment in 1916, he was described not as Delegate but Apostolic Internuncio to Peru and Bolivia

On 4 December 1916, Pope Benedict XV named him Apostolic Nuncio to Brazil.

On 27 August 1921, Pope Benedict appointed him to head Diocese of Vigevano in the region where he was raised; he was allowed to retain the personal title of archbishop and was referred to as Archbishop-Bishop of Vigevano.

He died on 18 May 1937 at the age of 75.
