= Maurilio Silvani =

Italian prelate

Maurilio Silvani (24 August 1882 – 22 December 1947) was an Italian prelate of the Catholic Church who devoted his entire career to the diplomatic service of the Holy See. He became an archbishop in 1936 and served as an Apostolic Nuncio from 1936 until his death.

== Biography ==
Maurilio Silvani was born on 24 August 1882 in Isola Sant'Antonio, Italy. He was ordained a priest of the Diocese of Alessandria on 17 June 1905.

He joined the diplomatic service in 1917. His first assignment was serving as secretary to Archbishop Eugenio Pacelli (later Pope Pius XII), who was the Apostolic Nuncio to Bavaria.

On 24 July 1936, Pope Pius XI named him titular archbishop of Naupactus and Apostolic Nuncio to Haiti and the Dominican Republic. He received his episcopal consecration on 13 September 1936 from Cardinal Eugenio Pacelli (later Pope Pius XII).

In 1937 he mediated a settlement following the October massacre of several thousand Haitians in the DR by the Dominican military, negotiating with Rafael Trujillo, military dictator of the Dominican Republic, to secure a payment of $750,000 to Haiti.

On 23 May 1942 Pope Pius XII named him Apostolic Nuncio to Chile.

On 4 May 1946, Pope Pius appointed him Apostolic Internuncio to Austria.

He died in Vienna on 22 December 1947 after a long illness.
