= Luigi Centoz =

Italian prelate

Luigi Centoz (2 April 1883 – 27 October 1969), also known as Louis Centoz, (Note: He was a native of the French-speaking Aosta Valley and is called Louis locally and in some sources.) was an Italian prelate of the Catholic Church who spent more than five decades in the diplomatic service of the Holy See, either in Rome or serving in offices abroad. He became an archbishop in 1932 and served as an Apostolic Nuncio from then until 1962. He was Vice Camerlengo of the Holy Roman Church from 1962 to 1969.

== Biography ==
Luigi Centoz was born on 2 April 1883 in Saint-Pierre, Aosta Valley, Italy. He was ordained a priest on 9 June 1906. In 1909 he joined the staff of the Holy See's Secretariat of State, where he worked directly for the Cardinal Secretary of State Rafael Merry del Val. On 6 January 1921, he was assigned to the nunciatures to Germany and Bavaria (and from 1925 to Prussia), working for the Nuncio Eugenio Pacelli, later Pope Pius XII. He participated in the conclave of February 1922, as aide to Cardinal Merry del Val.

On 28 January 1932, Pope Pius XI named him titular archbishop of Edessa in Osrhoëne and Apostolic Nuncio to Bolivia. He received his episcopal consecration in 14 February 1932 from Cardinal Eugenio Pacelli, the future Pope Pius XII. He chose as his episcopal motto "Dominus Fortitudo Mea" (The Lord is my Strength). On 16 September 1936, Pope Pius appointed him Apostolic Nuncio to the Venezuela.

On 19 February 1940, Pope Pius XII appointed him Apostolic Nuncio to Lithuania. He was expelled from Lithuania on 24 August after the Soviet invasion and returned to Rome. There he led a new Vatican commission considering how to counter Soviet Communism and held "long conferences" with the Pope.

On 3 December 1941, Pope Pius appointed him Apostolic Nuncio to Nicaragua, Panama, and Costa Rica. Hostilities prevented him from taking up those posts and he remained in Rome for the duration of World War II. He worked instead at the Secretariat on relief for prisoners of war and displaced persons.

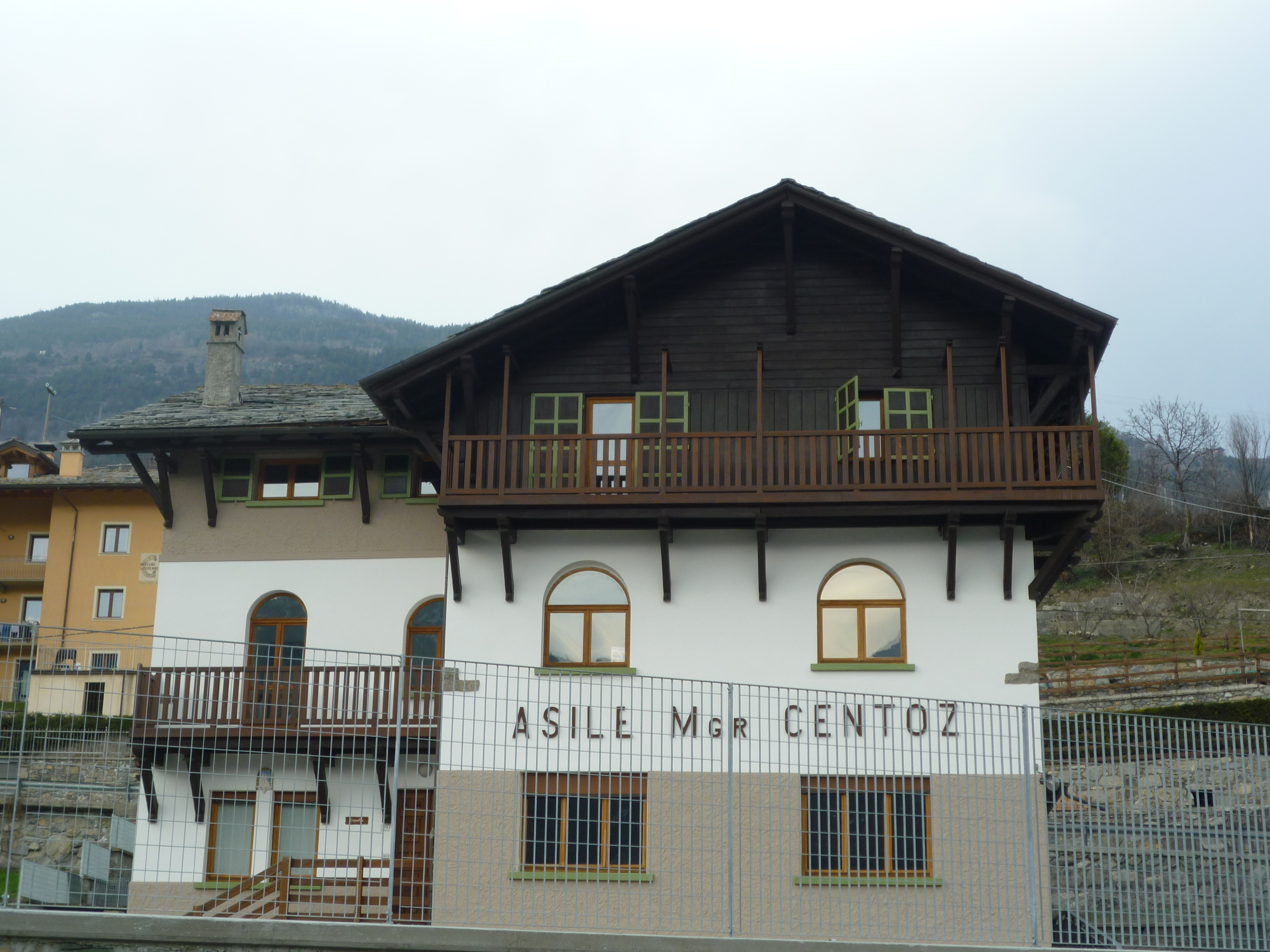

In 1946 he donated a building in his home town for use as a nursery school and childhood education center. It is named for him.

He finally reached Central America in February 1946. His role in Nicaragua ended with the appointment of his successor on 4 October 1948. He resigned the two other posts on 26 April 1952 and returned to Rome.

On 29 November 1954, Pope Pius named him Apostolic Nuncio to Cuba.

His half-century in the diplomatic service ended on 5 July 1962, when Pope John XXIII named him Vice Camerlengo of the Holy Roman Church. His term as Vice Camerlengo ended with the appointment of his successor, Vittorio Bartoccetti, on 24 March 1969.

Centoz retired to his home town. He died on 27 October 1969.
