= Luigi Punzolo =

Italian prelate

- Titular Archbishop of Sebastea
- Church: Catholic Church
- See: Sebastea
- In office: 6 December 1954 – 27 July 1989
- Predecessor: Alfred Sinnott
- Successor: Vacant
- Previous posts: Apostolic Administrator of Velletri (1967-1975); Apostolic Pro-Nuncio to Syria (1966-1967); Apostolic Internuncio to Syria (1962-1966); Apostolic Nuncio to Panama (1957-1961); Apostolic Nuncio to Paraguay (1954-1957)

Orders
- Ordination: 14 August 1927
- Consecration: 16 January 1955 by Clemente Micara

Personal details
- Born: 24 May 1905 Pozzuoli, Province of Naples, Kingdom of Italy
- Died: 27 July 1989 (aged 84)

Luigi Punzolo (24 May 1905 – 27 July 1989) was an Italian prelate of the Catholic Church who worked in the diplomatic service of the Holy See for thirty years. He became an archbishop in 1955 and served as Apostolic Nuncio until 1967. He spent another ten years as a diocesan administrator.

== Biography ==
Luigi Punzolo was born on 24 May 1905 in Pozzuoli, Italy. He was ordained a priest on 14 August 1927.

To prepare for a diplomatic career he entered the Pontifical Ecclesiastical Academy in 1932. His early assignments were in Austria and Czechoslovakia. Beginning in 1942 he worked in Rome on the exchange of prisoners of war and civilian populations.

On 6 December 1954, Pope Pius XII named him titular archbishop of Sebastea (it) and Apostolic Nuncio to Paraguay. He received his episcopal consecration on 16 January 1955 from Cardinal Clemente Micara.

On 12 December 1957, Pope Pius appointed him Apostolic Nuncio to Panama.

On 10 January 1962, Pope John XXIII appointed him Apostolic Internuncio to Syria. His title changed to Pro-Nuncio on 2 February 1966. His service in the diplomatic corps ended with the appointment of his successor in Syria, Raffaele Forni, on 17 June 1967.

On 2 October 1967, Pope Paul named him Apostolic Administrator of Velletri. He retired from that position on 24 May 1975, his 70th birthday.

He died in Velletri on 27 July 1989.
