= Albert Levame =

Monagasque prelate

- Apostolic Nuncio to Ireland
- Church: Catholic Church
- Archdiocese: Archdiocese of Chersonesus in Zechia
- In office: 16 June 1954 – 5 December 1958
- Predecessor: Gerald O'Hara
- Successor: Antonio Riberi
- Other post: Titular Archbishop of Chersonesus in Zechia (1933-1958)
- Previous posts: Apostolic Internunico to Egypt (1949-1954); Apostolic Nuncio to Uruguay (1939-1949); Apostolic Nuncio to Paraguay (1939-1941); Apostolic Nuncio to Guatemala (1936-1939); Apostolic Nuncio to El Salvador (1933-1939); Apostolic Nuncio to Honduras (1933-1938); Apostolic Delegate to Guatemala (1933-1936)

Orders
- Ordination: 21 May 1905
- Consecration: 4 February 1934 by Eugenio Maria Giuseppe Giovanni Pacelli

Personal details
- Born: 19 January 1881 Monaco
- Died: 5 December 1958 (aged 77) Dublin, Ireland

Albert Levame (19 January 1881 – 5 December 1958) was a Monagasque prelate of the Catholic Church who worked in the diplomatic service of the Holy See.

== Biography ==
Albert Levame was born in Monaco on 19 January 1881. He studied at the Jesuit College of the Visitation there and then at the Pontifical Gregorian University in Rome. He was ordained a priest on 21 May 1905.

To prepare for a diplomatic career he entered the Pontifical Ecclesiastical Academy in 1907. His early postings included stints in Vienna, Prague, Buenos Aires, and Paris.

On 21 December 1933, Pope Pius XI named him a titular archbishop of Chersonesus in Zechia and Apostolic Nuncio to El Salvador and to Honduras. He received his episcopal consecration from Cardinal Eugenio Pacelli on 4 February 1934.

On 12 November 1939, Pope Pius XII named him nuncio to Uruguay and to Paraguay. He resigned from the Paraguay position in 1941.

On 3 October 1949, Pope Pius appointed him Apostolic Internuncio to Egypt. There he took part in the negotiations that resolved the controversy over the teaching of the Christian religion in schools.

He was named Apostolic Nuncio to Ireland on 16 June 1954.

He died in the nunciature in Dublin on 5 December 1958. He had been ill for several months.
