= Lino Zanini =

Italian prelate

Lino Zanini (6 May 1909 – 25 October 1997) was an Italian prelate of the Catholic Church who worked in the diplomatic service of the Holy See for 45 years and then oversaw St. Peter's Basilica, including archaeological work and access improvements, for 15 years.

== Biography ==
Lino Zanini was born in Riese Pio X, Italy, on 6 May 1909. He was ordained a priest of the Archdiocese of Venice on 2 July 1933.

To prepare for a diplomatic career he entered the Pontifical Ecclesiastical Academy in 1937. He joined the Holy See's diplomatic corps in 1938; his early assignments in the diplomatic service included stints in Ecuador, Chile, Peru, Belgium and Lebanon.

On 16 June 1959, Pope John XXIII named him a titular archbishop and Apostolic Nuncio to the Dominican Republic. He received his episcopal consecration on 3 September from Cardinal Giovanni Urbani. Though the Church hierarchy in Santo Domingo had supported the regime of dictator Rafael Trujillo for decades, Zanini was charged with reversing that posture. At the very start, to maintain his distance from the government, he scheduled his arrival for the day after the birthday celebrations for Dominican dictator Rafael Trujillo. The government declared him persona non grata and he left the country on 21 May 1960.

He returned to Rome and worked at the Secretariat of State. On 30 May 1962, Pope John appointed him Apostolic Delegate to Jerusalem and Palestine. (Note: His precise title as found in the Acta Apostolicae Sedis was "Apostolic Delegate in Jerusalem, and Palestine, (Israel, Jordan, Cyprus)", which combines his title with a translation into standard geography, all with idiosyncratic punctuation. Various accounts of his appointment and of this delegation often confuse the two or attempt their own interpretation. For example, one biography uses its own list and its own ordering of the terms: "Delegato Apostolico in Giordania, Cipro, Gerusalemme e in Palestina". Others modify the description to reflect changes in the region. The Catholic Almanac for 1960 says it covered "Jerusalem, Palestine, Jordan, Cyprus" (page 235) and the same volume in 1968 adds Israel (page 246).)

On 4 January 1966, Pope Paul VI named him Apostolic Pro-Nuncio to Egypt.

On 7 May 1969, Pope Paul appointed him Nuncio to Argentina.

He returned to Rome, where on 29 December 1973 he was named a delegate of the Fabric of Saint Peter. He managed the construction of chapels in the grotto of the Basilica, with elevator access, and the restoration of its facade in the 1980s. From 1986 to 1989 he was president of the Permanent Commission for the Protection of Historical and Artistic Monuments of the Holy See.

He died in Vatican City on 25 October 1997 at the age of 88.
