= Diocese of Civitavecchia-Tarquinia =

Latin Catholic ecclesiastical jurisdiction in Italy

Coordinates: 42.1000°N 11.8000°E

Diocese of Civitavecchia-Tarquinia Dioecesis Centumcellarum-Tarquiniensis

Catholic
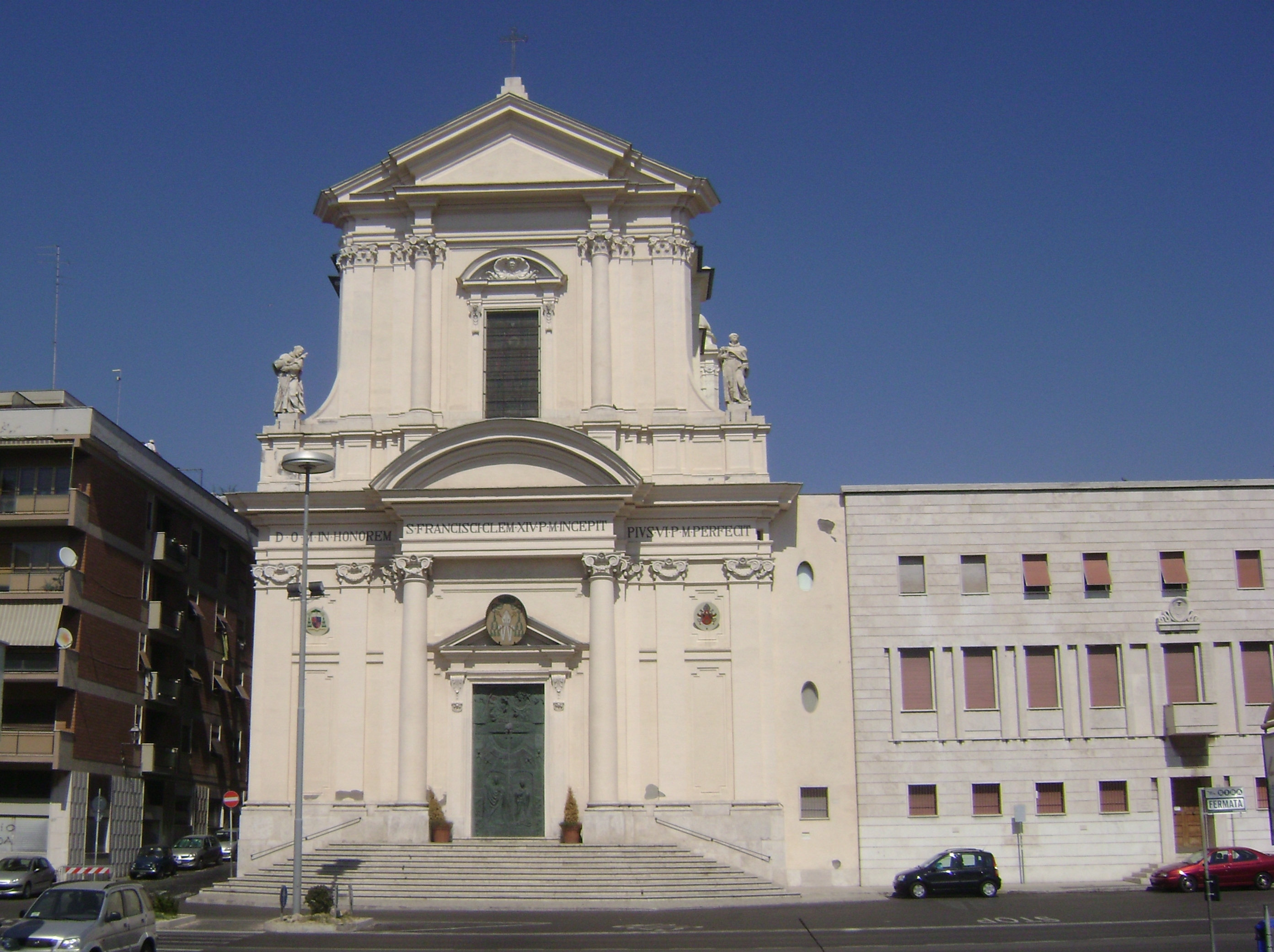
- Civitavecchia Cathedral

Location
- Country: Italy
- Ecclesiastical province: Immediately exempt to the Holy See

Statistics
- Area: 876 km^{2} (338 sq mi)
- Population: Total; Catholics: (as of 2023); 106,000 (est.) ▼; 103,300 (guess) ▼
- Parishes: 27

Information
- Denomination: Catholic Church
- Sui iuris church: Latin Church
- Rite: Roman Rite
- Established: 20 December 1825
- Cathedral: Cattedrale di S. Francesco d’Assisi (Civitavecchia)
- Co-cathedral: Concattedrale di Ss. Margherita e Martino (Tarquinia)
- Secular priests: 57 (diocesan) ▲21 (Religious Orders) ▼19 Permanent Deacons ▲

Current leadership
- Pope: Leo XIV
- Bishop: Gianrico Ruzza

Website
- www.civitavecchia.chiesacattolica.it

The Diocese of Civitavecchia-Tarquinia (Latin: Dioecesis Centumcellarum-Tarquiniensis) is a Latin Church ecclesiastical territory or diocese of the Catholic Church in Lazio, Italy. It was established under this name in 1986. The diocese is immediately exempt to the Holy See and not part of an ecclesiastical province.

== History ==
Centumcellæ was the ancient name of Civitavecchia. Catacombs have also been found here.

In 314 Epictetus, its bishop, was present at the Council of Arles. Another Epictetus, Bishop of Centumcellæ towards the middle of the fourth century, was an Arian and a counsellor of Emperor Constantius.

In 813, Centumcellae suffered a massive attack by the Moors; the city was captured, sacked, and burned. The survivors wandered for forty years in the forests and mountains. Pope Leo IV, needing a secure port on the Tyrrhenian Sea, built a new fortified city 13 km (8 mi) away from the ruins of Centumcellae, which he dedicated in 853. The inhabitants preferred the old location of their town, and gradually returned and rebuilt.

By 1086 the see of Civitavecchia was united with the diocese of Toscanella, resulting in one bishop governing two separate dioceses, aeque personaliter.

By 1092 Civitavecchia e Toscanella was united with the diocese of Viterbo in the person of Bishop Riccardus, who died in that year or earlier. Carlo Calisse points out that there is no evidence at all from 1050 to 1093 concerning the bishops of Civitavecchia, during which time the change must have taken place. A bull of Pope Celestine V, however, mentions that Pope Celestine III carried out the union, "just as was contained in the documents of his predecessor." Paul Fridolin Kehr points out that Cardinal Joannes of S. Clemente signs himself "Tuscanensis episcopus" until August 1192, and then from 4 October 1192 signs himself "Viterbiensis et Tuscanensis episcopus. The diocese of Civitavecchia was not suppressed but was held by a bishop who held three dioceses at the same time.

On 12 December 1825, in the bull "De Dominici Gregis", Pope Leo XII re-established the see, separating its territory from the diocese of Viterbo and uniting it to the diocese of Porto and Santa Rufina.

In 1854 the union with Santa Rufina was severed, and Civitavecchia was united with the diocese of Corneto (Tarquinia). From 1854 to 1986, the united dioceses were known as Tarquinia e Civitaveccia.

In a decree of the Second Vatican Council, it was recommended that dioceses be reorganized to take into account modern developments. A project begun on orders from Pope John XXIII, and continued under his successors, was intended to reduce the number of dioceses in Italy and to rationalize their borders in terms of modern population changes and shortages of clergy. The change was made urgent because of changes made to the Concordat between the Italian State and the Holy See on 18 February 1984, and embodied in a law of 3 June 1985. The change was approved by Pope John Paul II in an audience of 27 September 1986, and by a decree of the Sacred Congregation of Bishops of the Papal Curia on 30 September 1986. The dioceses of Tarquinia and Civitavecchia, which had up to that point shared a single bishop while retaining two diocesan structures, were united into a single diocese. Its name was to be Dioecesis Centumcellarum-Tarquiniensis. The seat of the diocese was to be in Civitavecchia. The former cathedral in Tarquinia was to have the honorary title of co-cathedral, and its Chapter was to be the Capitulum Concathedralis. There was to be only one episcopal curia, one seminary, one ecclesiastical tribunal; and all the clergy were to be incardinated in the diocese of Civitavecchia-Tarquinia. Bishop Girolamo Grillo continued as bishop of the newly united diocese.

== Bishops ==
...

- (attested 314) : Epictetus

(attested 356, 359) : Epictetus (Arian)

- (attested 487) : Paschasius
- (attested 495–499) : Molensius
- (attested 531) : Carosus

...

- (attested 559): Laurentius

...

- (attested 590, 595, 596, 601) : Dominicus

...

- (attested 769) : Stephanus

...

- (attested 649) : Martinus

...

- (attested 826) : Petrus

...

- (attested 853, 861) : Dominicus

...

- (attested 940) : Valentinus

...

- (attested 1015) : Petrus

...

- (attested 1036, 1050) : Azo

...

- (dead in 1092) : Riccardus

...

=== Bishops of Civitavecchia e Tarquinia ===
- (1854–1868) : Camillo de’ Marchesi Bisleti
- (1868–1882) : Francesco Giuseppe Gandolfi
- (1882–1906) : Angelo Rossi
- (1907–1910) : Beda Giovanni Cardinale, O.S.B.
- (1910–1917) : Pacifico Fiorani
- (1917–1925) : Luca Piergiovanni
- (1926–1931) : Emilio Maria Cottafavi
- (1932–1944) : Luigi Drago
- (1945–1976) : Giulio Bianconi
- (1976–1983) : Antonio Mazza

=== Bishops of Civitavecchia-Tarquinia ===
- (1983–2006) : Girolamo Grillo
- (2006–2010) : Carlo Chenis, S.D.B.
- (2010–2020) : Luigi Marrucci
- (2020) Gianrico Ruzza

== See also ==
- Roman Catholic Diocese of Tuscanella
- Roman Catholic Diocese of Viterbo

== Sources ==
- Eubel, Conradus, ed. (1913). Hierarchia catholica (in Latin). Vol. 1 (Tomus I) (second ed.). Münster: Libreria Regensbergiana. (in Latin)
- Eubel, Conradus, ed. (1914). Hierarchia catholica (in Latin). Vol. 2 (Tomus 2) (second ed.). Münster: Libreria Regensbergiana.
- Eubel, Conradus; Gulik, Guilelmus (1923). Hierarchia catholica (in Latin). Vol. 3 (Tomus 3) (second ed.). Münster: Libreria Regensbergiana.
- Gams, Pius Bonifatius (1873). Series episcoporum Ecclesiae catholicae: quotquot innotuerunt a beato Petro apostolo (in Latin). Ratisbon: Typis et Sumptibus Georgii Josephi Manz.
- Gauchat, Patritius (Patrice) (1935). Hierarchia catholica. Vol. IV (1592-1667). Münster: Libraria Regensbergiana.
- Ritzler, Remigius; Sefrin, Pirminus (1952). Hierarchia catholica medii et recentis aevi (in Latin). Vol. V (1667-1730). Patavii: Messagero di S. Antonio.
- Ritzler, Remigius; Sefrin, Pirminus (1958). Hierarchia catholica medii et recentis aevi (in Latin). Vol. VI (1730-1799). Patavii: Messagero di S. Antonio.

=== Special studies ===
- Calisse, Carlo (1898). Storia di Civitavecchia. Firenze : Barbèra. (in Italian)
- Kehr, Paul Fridolin (1907). Italia pontificia (in Latin). Vol. II. Latium. Berlin: Apud Weidmannos. pp. 200–203.
- Lanzoni, Francesco (1927). Le diocesi d'Italia dalle origini al principio del secolo VII (an. 604). Faenza: F. Lega, pp. 519–521. (in Italian)
- Schwartz, Gerhard (1907). Die Besetzung der Bistümer Reichsitaliens unter den sächsischen und salischen Kaisern: mit den Listen der Bischöfe, 951-1122. Leipzig: B.G. Teubner. pp. 257–258. (in German)
- Ughelli, Ferdinando; Coleti, Niccolo (1722). Italia sacra (in Latin). Vol. Tomus decimus. Venice: Apud Sebastianum Coleti. pp. 55–57.
