= Holy See–Italy relations =

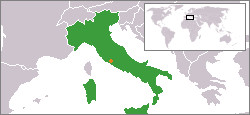
- Italy: Holy See

Holy See–Italy relations are the special relations between the Holy See, which is sovereign over the Vatican City, and the Italian Republic.

== History ==
Relations with the Kingdom of Italy were difficult during the papacies of Pius IX and Leo XIII, who had to endure the status of prisoner of the Vatican after the capture of Rome, refusing to recognize the Law of Guarantees. Leo XIII forbade Christians from participating in elections and accused the Italian state of being controlled by freemasons.

It was only under Pius XI that the Lateran Treaty was signed, establishing the State of Vatican City, allowing for greater papal autonomy.

The new secular Italian Republic established in 1946 recognized freedom of religion. However, under Pius XII and Paul VI, the Christian Democrats thrived and had great influence on Italian politics, in order to stop the Italian Communist Party from gaining power.

== Diplomatic Legations to the Vatican in Italy ==
Due to the size of the Vatican City State, embassies accredited to the Holy See are based in Italy. Embassy officials of other countries also stay in Italy. Treaties signed between Italy and the Vatican City State permit such embassages. The Embassy of Italy to the Holy See is unique amongst foreign embassages in that it is the only embassy based on its home territory.

The Holy See maintains formal diplomatic relations with 176 sovereign states, the European Union, and the Order of Malta; 69 of the diplomatic missions accredited to the Holy See are situated in Rome, though those countries then have two embassies in the same city, since, by agreement between the Holy See and Italy, the same person cannot be accredited simultaneously to both.

This is shown clearly by the fact that Italy recognizes the People's Republic of China (PRC) and the PRC's Embassy to Italy is in Rome. However, the Vatican City State recognizes the Republic of China (ROC, which controls Taiwan) and as such, the ROC Embassy to the Holy See is also in Rome.

== See also ==
- Apostolic Nunciature to Italy
- Lateran Treaty
- List of diplomatic missions in Italy
- List of diplomatic missions of Italy
- Index of Vatican City-related articles
- Holy See–European Union relations
- Public funding of the Catholic Church in Italy
