= Séamus Patrick Horgan =

Irish Roman Catholic priest (born 1969)

His Excellency, The Most Reverend Séamus Patrick Horgan DCL
- Apostolic Nuncio to South Sudan
- Church: Catholic
- Appointed: 14 May 2024
- Predecessor: Hubertus van Megen
- Other post: Titular Archbishop of Árd Sratha
- Previous posts: First counsellor, Apostolic Nunciature to the United States; Minutante, Section for Relations with States; Counsellor and Secretary, Apostolic Nunciature to the Philippines; Secretary, Apostolic Nunciature to Switzerland; Attaché and Secretary, Apostolic Nunciature to Uganda

Orders
- Ordination: 11 June 1994 by Michael Harty
- Consecration: 27 July 2024 by Pietro Parolin, Luis Antonio Tagle and Fintan Monahan

Personal details
- Born: 31 August 1969 (age 57) Ennis, County Clare, Ireland
- Parents: Denis and Pauline Horgan
- Education: Pontifical Gregorian University; St Patrick's College, Maynooth
- Motto: Nec laudibus nec timore (Latin for 'Neither praise nor fear')

Ordination history of Séamus Patrick Horgan
History
Priestly ordination
- Ordained by: Michael Harty
Episcopal consecration
- Principal consecrator: Pietro Parolin
- Co-consecrators: Luis Antonio Tagle; Fintan Monahan

Styles of Séamus Patrick Horgan
- Reference style: His Excellency; The Most Reverend
- Spoken style: Your Excellency
- Religious style: Archbishop

Séamus Patrick Horgan (/ˈʃeɪməs/ SHAY-məs; born 31 August 1969) is an Irish Catholic prelate who served as Apostolic Nuncio to South Sudan form July 2024 to July 2026 when he resigned his position.

== Early life and education ==
Horgan was born in Ennis, County Clare on 31 August 1969, one of four children to Denis and Pauline Horgan.

He attended primary school at Ennis National School and secondary school at St Flannan's College, before studying for the priesthood at St Patrick's College, Maynooth, completing a Bachelor of Arts at NUI Maynooth in 1990 and a Bachelor of Theology at the Pontifical University in 1993.

Horgan was ordained a priest for the Diocese of Killaloe on 11 June 1994, making him a classmate of fellow nuncio Michael Francis Crotty and the current Bishop of Waterford and Lismore, Alphonsus Cullinan.

== Presbyteral ministry ==
Horgan's first pastoral assignment was as curate in Bodyke, before spending a number of years as curate in Roscrea.

He moved to Rome in 2000, where he completed a Licentiate of Canon Law at the Pontifical Gregorian University in 2001, before joining the Pontifical Ecclesiastical Academy in preparation for a diplomatic career for the Holy See.

Horgan subsequently completed a Doctorate of Canon Law while studying at the Pontifical Ecclesiastical Academy, in preparation for the diplomatic service of the Holy See on 1 July 2005.

== Diplomatic service ==
Horgan's first diplomatic assignment was as attaché and subsequently secretary of the apostolic nunciature to Uganda, between 2005 and 2008, when he was appointed secretary of the apostolic nunciature to Switzerland.

Horgan was appointed secretary and subsequently counsellor to the apostolic nunciature to the Philippines in 2012, before returning to Rome in 2015, following his appointment as a minutante in the Section for Relations with States.

He was appointed first counsellor to the Apostolic Nunciature to the United States in 2020. While in the United States he worked under then-Archbishop Christophe Pierre. He previously worked under Archbishop Pierre in Uganda.

Horgan was appointed a Chaplain of His Holiness by Pope Benedict XVI in 2008 and a Prelate of Honour of His Holiness by Pope Francis in 2019. In addition to his native English, he speaks French and Italian, and has a working knowledge of German.

=== Apostolic Nuncio to South Sudan ===
Horgan was appointed apostolic nuncio to South Sudan and titular archbishop-elect of Árd Sratha by Pope Francis on 14 May 2024. He is the first nuncio to reside in South Sudan.

He received episcopal ordination at the hands of Cardinal Secretary of State Pietro Parolin, on 27 July in the Cathedral of Saints Peter and Paul, Ennis.

== See also ==
- List of heads of the diplomatic missions of the Holy See

Diplomatic posts
Preceded by Hubertus van Megen	Apostolic Nuncio to South Sudan; 2024–present	Succeeded by incumbent
