= Apostolic Nunciature to South Sudan =

Diplomatic Mission of the Holy See in Africa

The Apostolic Nunciature to South Sudan is the diplomatic mission of the Holy See to South Sudan. The Apostolic Nuncio to South Sudan is an ecclesiastical office of the Catholic Church in South Sudan, with the rank of an ambassador. The nuncio serves both as the ambassador of the Holy See to the Republic of South Sudan and as the point-of-contact between the Catholic hierarchy in South Sudan and the pope.

The Holy See and the government of South Sudan announced on 22 February 2013 that they had reached an agreement "to establish diplomatic relations at the level of Apostolic Nunciature on the part of the Holy See and of Embassy on the part of the Republic of South Sudan". Before South Sudan became an independent nation, its territory fell within the remit of the Apostolic Nunciature to Sudan, established as a nunciature in 1972 and previously overseen by a variety of delegations with regional authority, the last of which was the Delegation to Eastern Africa erected in 1960.

Since the creation of this office, the Nuncio also held the title of Apostolic Nuncio to Kenya and resided in Nairobi, Kenya.

On 14 May 2024, Séamus Patrick Horgan became the first resident nuncio of South Sudan.

== List of papal representatives to South Sudan ==
- Charles Daniel Balvo (21 December 2013 - 21 September 2018)
- Hubertus van Megen (19 March 2019 – 14 May 2024)
- Séamus Patrick Horgan (14 May 2024 – present)
