= Michael Francis Crotty =

Irish prelate of the Catholic Church

His Excellency, The Most Reverend Michael Francis Crotty
- Apostolic Nuncio to Nigeria; Titular Archbishop of Lindisfarne
- Church: Roman Catholic
- Appointed: 16 July 2024
- Installed: 15 August 2020 (Lindisfarne)
- Predecessor: Antonio Guido Filipazzi
- Other post: Titular Archbishop of Lindisfarne
- Previous posts: Apostolic Nuncio of Burkina Faso and Niger (2020-2024); First Counsellor of the Apostolic Nunciature to Spain (2017-2020); Section for Relations with States of the Secretariat of State of the Holy See (2009-2017); First Secretary of the Apostolic Nunciatures to Iraq and Jordan (2007-2009); Secretary of the Apostolic Nunciatures to Canada (2004-2007); Secretary of the Apostolic Nunciatures to Kenya and Deputy Head of Mission of the Permanent Observer Mission of the Holy See to UNEP and UN-HABITAT (2001-2004)

Orders
- Ordination: 3 July 1994 by John Magee
- Consecration: 15 August 2020 by Paul Gallagher

Personal details
- Born: 26 March 1970 (age 56) Mallow, County Cork, Ireland
- Parents: Timothy and Mary Crotty
- Education: Pontifical Gregorian University; Pontifical Irish College; St Patrick's College, Maynooth
- Motto: Quis sicut Deus (Who is like God)
- Coat of arms

Styles of Michael Francis Crotty
- Reference style: The Most Reverend
- Spoken style: Your Excellency
- Religious style: Archbishop

Michael Francis Crotty (born 26 March 1970) is an Irish Roman Catholic prelate who is Titular Archbishop of Lindisfarne and serves as Apostolic Nuncio to Nigeria since 16 July 2024.

== Early life and education ==
Crotty was born in Mallow, County Cork, on 26 March 1970, to Timothy and Mary Crotty, and grew up in Skeheen, Mitchelstown.

He attended primary school at Ballygiblin National School and secondary school at the Christian Brothers school in Mitchelstown. Crotty studied for the priesthood at St Patrick's College, Maynooth, completing a Bachelor of Arts in anthropology and modern history from the National University of Ireland in 1990 and a Bachelor of Divinity from the Pontifical University in 1993.

He was ordained a priest for the Diocese of Cloyne on 3 July 1994.

== Presbyteral ministry ==
Following ordination, Crotty was appointed to further studies at the Pontifical Irish College and the Pontifical Gregorian University, Rome, completing a licentiate in ecclesiastical history at the Pontifical Gregorian University in 1997, a licentiate in canon law in 1999 and a doctorate in ecclesiastical history in 2001.

He was appointed Chaplain of His Holiness, with the title of Monsignor, by Pope Benedict XVI in 2005, and subsequently as Prelate of Honour of His Holiness by Pope Francis in 2014.

== Diplomatic Service ==
Crotty entered the Pontifical Ecclesiastical Academy in 1997, in preparation for a diplomatic career for the Holy See.

Upon completion of studies at the Pontifical Ecclesiastical Academy, he entered the diplomatic service of the Holy See on 1 July 2001, with his first diplomatic appointment as secretary of the Apostolic Nunciature to Kenya. In that role, Crotty also served as deputy head of mission of the Permanent Observer Mission of the Holy See to UNEP and UN-HABITAT.

In 2004 he was appointed secretary of the Apostolic Nunciature to Canada, and in 2007 first secretary of the Apostolic Nunciatures to Iraq and Jordan. In 2009 he was appointed to the Section for Relations with States of the Secretariat of State of the Holy See, and in 2017 first counsellor of the Apostolic Nunciature to Spain.

=== Titular Archbishop of Lindisfarne and Apostolic Nuncio to Burkina Faso and Niger ===
Crotty was appointed Titular Archbishop of Lindisfarne and Apostolic Nuncio to Burkina Faso by Pope Francis on 1 February 2020.

In addition to his appointment as Nuncio to Burkina Faso, Crotty was simultaneously appointed Nuncio to Niger by Pope Francis on 25 April 2020.

On 15 August 2020 he was ordained bishop by the Secretary of the Section for Relations with States of the Secretariat of State of the Holy See, Archbishop Paul Gallagher, in St Colman's Cathedral, Cobh.

=== Apostolic Nuncio to Nigeria ===
On 16 July 2024, Crotty was appointed as Apostolic Nuncio to Nigeria by Pope Francis. He presented his Letters of Credence on 1 February 2025.

== See also ==
- List of heads of the diplomatic missions of the Holy See

Diplomatic posts
Preceded by Piergiorgio Bertoldi	Apostolic Nuncio to Burkina Faso and Niger; 2020–2024	Succeeded by Giancarlo Dellagiovanna
Preceded by Antonio Guido Filipazzi	Apostolic Nuncio to Nigeria; 2024–present	Succeeded by incumbent
