= Apostolic Delegation to Puerto Rico =

Papal representative in Puerto Rico

The Apostolic Delegation to Puerto Rico represents the interests of the Holy See in the Commonwealth of Puerto Rico. Its head is titled the Apostolic Delegate. His position is ecclesiastical, not diplomatic.

The papacy has used a series of representatives and territorial structures to manage its affairs in Puerto Rico and in the Caribbean region generally. It began in 1898 with a delegation that was based in Havana and assigned responsibility for Cuba and Puerto Rico. On 7 December 1925, Pope Pius XI replaced that with the Apostolic Delegation to the Antilles, still seated in Havana, with responsibility for the Greater and Lesser Antilles.

The Holy See overhauled that arrangement in 1938. It recognized that no one individual could be expected visit the remote locations of the Antilles by boat, and it determined to use its existing network of papal representations in the region, including the Apostolic Nunciature to Cuba established in September 1935. On 10 August 1938, the Holy See suppressed the Delegation to the Antilles and divided responsibility for the region among several nunciatures and delegations. Puerto Rico was assigned to the Nunciatures to the Dominican Republic and to Haiti, two offices then headed jointly by a single diplomat. (Note: In dismembering of the Delegation to the Antilles, the Holy See made the following assignments: Jamaica and British Honduras to the Nunciature to Cuba; Barbados and the islands belonging to Venezuela to the Nunciature to Venezuela; the rest of the Lesser Antilles and the island of Puerto Rico and its associated territories to the jointly led Nunciatures to the Dominican Republic and Haiti; Bermuda to the Delegation to Canada and Newfoundland; and Bahama to the Delegation to the United States.) The structure was unusual in that the Holy See was normally particular as to titles and areas of responsibility. Puerto Rico then disappeared from the Holy See's announcement of diplomatic postings and was not even mentioned when the two nunciatures responsible for Puerto Rico were assigned to two different diplomats beginning in 1953. (Note: Salvatore Siino was named Nuncio to the Dominican Republic on 27 October 1953 and Luigi Raimondi was named Nuncio to Haiti on 24 December 1953.)

On 19 March 1975 Pope Paul VI established the Delegation to the Antilles once again, initially based in Port-au-Prince. Puerto Rico was only named again in announcements of diplomatic assignments in the 21st century.

The title Apostolic Delegate to Puerto Rico is held by the prelate appointed Apostolic Nuncio to the Dominican Republic; he resides in the Dominican Republic.

== Papal representatives to Puerto Rico ==
Apostolic Delegates to Cuba and Puerto Rico

- Placide Louis Chapelle (16 September 1898 – 9 August 1905 )
- Giuseppe Aversa (24 May 1906 – 21 October 1909)
- Adolfo Alejandro Nouel y Bobadilla (3 November 1913 – 1915?)
- Tito Trocchi (9 December 1915 – 25 May 1921)
- Pietro Benedetti (22 July 1921 – 1926)

Apostolic Delegate to the Antilles (established 1925)

- George J. Caruana (22 December 1925 (Note: In September 1935, Caruana was named the first Nuncio to Cuba, retaining his responsibilities as Delegate to the Antilles.) – 10 August 1938)

Apostolic Delegates to the Antilles (established 1975)

- Luigi Conti (1 August 1975 – 9 February 1980)
- Paul Fouad Tabet (9 February 1980 – 11 February 1984)
- Manuel Monteiro de Castro (16 February 1985 – 21 August 1990)
- Eugenio Sbarbaro (7 February 1991 – 26 April 2000)
- Emil Paul Tscherrig (8 July 2000 – 2001)

Apostolic delegates to Puerto Rico

- Timothy Broglio (27 February 2001 – 19 November 2007)
- Józef Wesołowski (24 January 2008 – 21 August 2013)
- Jude Thaddeus Okolo (7 October 2013 – 13 May 2017)
- Ghaleb Moussa Abdalla Bader (24 August 2017 – 15 February 2023)
- Piergiorgio Bertoldi (18 May 2023 – present)

== See also ==
- Apostolic Delegation to the Antilles
