= Apostolic Nunciature to Burundi =

Diplomatic Mission of the Holy See in Burundi

- Location: Bujumbura, Burundi.
- Address: Avenue des Travailleurs 28, OR, Avenue des Travailleurs 28, B.P. 1068, Bujumbura, Burundi.
- Apostolic Nuncio: Archbishop Mirosław Adamczyk

The Apostolic Nunciature to Burundi the diplomatic mission of the Holy See to Burundi. It is located in Bujumbura. The current Apostolic Nuncio is Archbishop Dieudonné Datonou, who was named to the position by Pope Francis on 7 October 2021.

The Apostolic Nunciature to the Republic of Burundi is an ecclesiastical office of the Catholic Church in Burundi, with the rank of an embassy. The nuncio serves both as the ambassador of the Holy See to the President of Burundi, and as delegate and point-of-contact between the Catholic hierarchy in Burundi and the Pope.

== Apostolic Nuncios to Burundi ==
- Vito Roberti (11 February 1963 – 15 August 1965)
- Émile André Jean-Marie Maury (16 June 1965 – 1967)
- Amelio Poggi (27 May 1967 – 27 November 1969)
- William Aquin Carew (27 November 1969 – 13 May 1974)
- Nicola Rotunno (7 January 1975 – 13 April 1978)
- Donato Squicciarini (31 August 1978 – 16 September 1981)
- Bernard Jacqueline )24 April 1982 – October 1985)
- Pietro Sambi (10 October 1985 – 28 November 1991)
- Rino Passigato (16 December 1991 – 18 March 1996)
- Emil Paul Tscherrig (4 May 1996 – 8 July 2000)
- Michael Courtney (18 August 2000 – 29 December 2003)
- Paul Richard Gallagher (22 January 2004 – 19 February 2009)
- Franco Coppola (16 July 2009 – 31 January 2014)
- Wojciech Załuski (15 July 2014 – 29 September 2020)
- Dieudonné Datonou (7 October 2021 – present)
