= Giuseppe Laterza =

Italian prelate of the Catholic Church

His Excellency, The Most Reverend Giuseppe Laterza
- Apostolic Nuncio to the Central African Republic and Chad; Titular Archbishop of Vartana
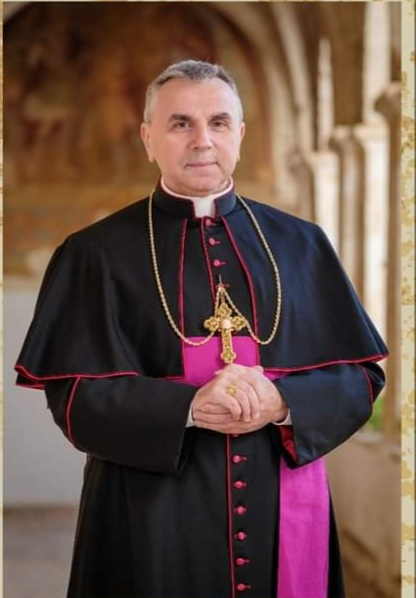
- Appointed: 5 January 2023
- Predecessor: Santiago de Wit Guzmán
- Other post: Titular Archbishop of Vartana

Orders
- Ordination: 12 November 1994 by Domenico Padovano
- Consecration: 4 March 2023 by Pietro Parolin, Dominique Mamberti, and Giuseppe Favale

Personal details
- Born: 12 November 1970 (age 55) Conversano, Bari, Italy
- Motto: Fortitudo Mea Dominus
- Coat of arms

Styles of Giuseppe Laterza
- Reference style: His Excellency; The Most Reverend
- Spoken style: Your Excellency
- Religious style: Archbishop

Giuseppe Laterza (born 12 November 1970) is an Italian prelate of the Catholic Church who works in the diplomatic service of the Holy See.

== Biography ==
Mons. Giuseppe Laterza was born on 12 November 1970 in Conversano, Bari, Italy. He was ordained a priest for the Diocese of Conversano-Monopoli on 12 November 1994.

He obtained a Baccalaureate in Philosophy (1990), a Baccalaureate in Theology (1993), a Licentiate in Liturgical Theology (1995), a Doctorate in Canon Law (2000) and he graduated from the Pontifical Ecclesiastic Academy in 2003.

== Diplomatic Career ==
He entered the Holy See Diplomatic Service on 1 July 2003, and has served in the apostolic nunciature in Uruguay and Poland, in the Section for Relations with States and International Organizations of the Secretariat of State, and in the Pontifical Representations in Italy and Georgia.

From January 2019, he began serving as a diplomatic Councilor to the Apostolic Nunciature in Georgia and Armenia.

On 5 January 2023, Pope Francis appointed him Titular Archbishop of Vartana and Apostolic Nuncio to the Central African Republic and Chad. He was consecrated as an archbishop on 4 March 2023.

== Episcopal genealogy ==
- Card. Scipione Rebiba
- Card. Giulio Antonio Santorio
- Card. Girolamo Bernerio, O.P.
- Arcib. Galeazzo Sanvitale
- Card. Ludovico Ludovisi
- Card. Luigi Caetani
- Card. Ulderico Carpegna
- Card. Paluzzo Paluzzi Altieri degli Albertoni
- Pope Benedetto XIII
- Pope Benedetto XIV
- Pope Clemente XIII
- Card. Bernardino Giraud
- Card. Alessandro Mattei
- Card. Pietro Francesco Galleffi
- Card. Giacomo Filippo Fransoni
- Card. Antonio Saverio De Luca
- Archb. Gregor Leonhard Andreas von Scherr, O.S.B.
- Archb. Friedrich von Schreiber
- Archb. Franz Joseph von Stein
- Archb. Joseph von Schork
- Bishop Ferdinand von Schlör
- Archb. Johann Jakob von Hauck
- Bishop Ludwig Sebastian
- Card. Joseph Wendel
- Bishop Josef Schneider
- Bishop Josef Stangl
- Pope Benedetto XVI
- Card. Pietro Parolin
- Archb. Giuseppe Laterza

== See also ==
- List of heads of the diplomatic missions of the Holy See
- Catholic Church in Chad
