= Luís Miguel Muñoz Cárdaba =

Spanish prelate of the Catholic Church (born 1965)

His Excellency, The Most Reverend Luís Miguel Muñoz Cárdaba
- Apostolic Nuncio of Mozambique; Titular Archbishop of Nasai
- Appointed: 23 January 2024
- Predecessor: Piergiorgio Bertoldi
- Other post: Titular Archbishop of Nasai
- Previous post: Apostolic Nuncio to Sudan and Eritrea (2020-2024)

Orders
- Ordination: 28 June 1992 by Marcelo González Martín
- Consecration: 25 July 2020 by Pietro Parolin, Paul Gallagher, and Francisco Cerro Chaves

Personal details
- Born: 25 August 1965 (age 61) Vallelado, Spain
- Motto: Pro Ecclesia Et Eclesiis

Styles of Luís Miguel Muñoz Cárdaba
- Reference style: His Excellency; The Most Reverend
- Spoken style: Your Excellency
- Religious style: Archbishop

Luis Miguel Muñoz Cárdaba (born 25 August 1965) is a Spanish prelate of the Catholic Church who has worked in the diplomatic service of the Holy See since 2001.

== Biography ==
Luis Miguel Muñoz Cárdaba was born in Vallelado in Segovia province, Spain, on 25 August 1965. He earned a law degree at the Complutense University of Madrid. He prepared for the priesthood in Toledo at the Greater Seminary and the Superior Institute of Theological Studies of San Ildefonso. He was ordained a priest of the Archdiocese of Toledo on 28 June 1992 by Cardinal Marcelo González Martín, Archbishop of Toledo.

He continued his studies in Rome at the Pontifical Spanish College. He obtained a doctorate in dogmatic theology at the Pontifical Gregorian University and a degree in canon law at the Pontifical University of the Holy Cross. His dissertation at the Gregorian analyzed Pope John Paul II's Pastor Bonus as an elaboration and fulfillment of the reform initiated by Pope Paul VI in addressing the demands and expectations of the Second Vatican Council.

== Diplomatic career ==
He joined the staff of the Secretariat of State in 1994. To prepare for a career in the diplomatic service, he entered the Pontifical Ecclesiastical Academy in 1999 and entered the diplomatic service of the Holy See in 2001. His assignments have included stints in the apostolic nunciatures in Greece, Mexico, Belgium, Italy, Australia, France, and Turkey.

On 31 March 2020, Pope Francis appointed him titular archbishop of Nasai and Apostolic Nuncio to both Sudan and Eritrea. Plans for his ordination are on hold pending the relaxation of restrictions on movement and public gatherings imposed as a consequence of the COVID-19 pandemic.

The consecration finally took place on 25 July 2020, presided by Cardinal Pietro Parolin, the Cardinal Secretary of State, with Archbishops Paul Richard Gallagher and Francisco Cerro Chaves serving as co-consecrators, in the Toledo Cathedral.

On 23 January 2024, Pope Francis appointed him as Apostolic Nuncio to Mozambique.

== See also ==
- List of heads of the diplomatic missions of the Holy See
