= Mario Tagliaferri =

Italian prelate (1927–1999)

- Apostolic Nuncio to France
- Church: Catholic Church
- In office: 13 July 1995 – 21 May 1999
- Predecessor: Lorenzo Antonetti
- Successor: Fortunato Baldelli
- Other post: Titular Archbishop of Formiae (1970-1999)
- Previous posts: Apostolic Nuncio to Spain (1985-1995); Apostolic Nuncio to Peru (1978-1985); Apostolic Pro-Nuncio to Cuba (1975-1978); Apostolic Delegate to Chad & the Republic of the Congo (1973-1975); Apostolic Pro-Nuncio to the Central African Republic (1970-1975); Apostolic Delegate to Central Western Africa (1970-1973)

Orders
- Ordination: 5 August 1950
- Consecration: 7 May 1970 by Jean-Marie Villot

Personal details
- Born: 1 June 1927 Alatri, Province of Frosinone, Kingdom of Italy
- Died: 21 May 1999 (aged 71) Paris, France

Mario Tagliaferri (1 June 1927 – 21 May 1999) was an Italian prelate of the Catholic Church who spent his career in the diplomatic service of the Holy See. He became an archbishop in 1970 and served as an Apostolic Nuncio from then until his death.

== Biography ==
Mario Tagliaferri was born in Alatri (Frosinone), Italy, on 1 June 1927. He was ordained a priest on 5 August 1950.

To prepare for a diplomatic career he entered the Pontifical Ecclesiastical Academy in 1952. He joined the diplomatic service in 1954 and his early assignments took him to the Dominican Republic, the United States, Canada and Brazil.

On 5 March 1970, Pope Paul VI named him a titular archbishop and Apostolic Pro-Nuncio to Central African Republic, as well as Apostolic Delegate to the Republic of the Congo and Chad.

He received his episcopal consecration on 7 May from Cardinal Jean-Marie Villot.

On 25 June 1975, Pope Paul appointed him Apostolic Pro-Nuncio to Cuba.

On 15 December 1978, Pope John Paul II named him Nuncio to Peru. In that capacity, he signed on behalf of the Pope the Agreement between the Holy See and the Republic of Peru (July 26, 1980).

On 20 July 1985, Pope John Paul named him Nuncio to Spain. After Tagliaferri had been nuncio there for three years, Cardinal Vicente Enrique y Tarancón, Archbishop of Madrid, complained that he still acted like a typical nuncio in South American, where nuncios are accustomed to giving orders, a style unfamiliar to the Spanish Church, which he helped give a more conservative character.

On 13 July 1995, Pope John Paul named him Nuncio to France. El País expressed surprise that he was sent to France rather than brought to Rome and made a cardinal now that he was 68. He took up that post on 16 October 1995 and established a routine–unusual for a nuncio–of regular visits to dioceses around the country. An official with the Conference of French Bishops recalled: "The more he was invited, the happier he was."

He died on 21 May 1999, shortly before his 72nd birthday.
