= Apostolic Nunciature to Mozambique =

Diplomatic post of the Holy See

The Apostolic Nunciature to Mozambique is the diplomatic mission of the Holy See to Mozambique. The Apostolic Nuncio to Mozambique is an ecclesiastical office of the Catholic Church in Mozambique, with the rank of an ambassador. The nuncio serves both as the ambassador of the Holy See to the Republic of Mozambique and as the point-of-contact between the Catholic hierarchy in Mozambique and the pope.

== List of papal representatives to Mozambique ==
Apostolic Delegates

- Francesco Colasuonno (6 December 1974 - 7 March 1981)
- Giacinto Berloco (15 March 1990 - 17 July 1993)
- Peter Stephan Zurbriggen (13 November 1993 - 13 June 1998)

Apostolic Nuncios

- Juliusz Janusz (26 September 1998 - 9 April 2003)
- George Panikulam (3 July 2003 - 24 October 2008)
- Antonio Arcari (12 December 2008 - 5 July 2014)
- Edgar Peña Parra (21 February 2015 - 15 August 2018)
- Piergiorgio Bertoldi (19 March 2019 – 18 May 2023)
- Luís Miguel Muñoz Cárdaba (23 January 2024 – present)
