= Giovanni Gravelli =

Italian prelate (1922–1981)

Giovanni Gravelli (12 March 1922 – 11 December 1981) was an Italian prelate of the Catholic Church who joined the diplomatic service of the Holy See in 1950 and became an archbishop and Apostolic Nuncio in 1967.

== Biography ==
Giovanni Gravelli was born on 12 March 1922 in Città Sant'Angelo, Italy. He studied at the seminaries of Penne and Chieti and was ordained a priest on 29 October 1944. He performed parish work and then continued his studies at the Pontifical University of Rome. To prepare for a diplomatic career he entered the Pontifical Ecclesiastical Academy in 1948.

He entered the diplomatic service of the Holy See in 1950 and worked on the staff of the Secretariat of State in Rome until 1955. He was secretary at the nunciature to Egypt from 1955 to 1957; councilor in France from 1957 to 1963; he was councilor in France; councilor in Colombia from 1963 to 1964; and nunciature officer in El Salvador and Guatemala from 1964 to 1967.

On 24 December 1967, Pope Paul VI named him titular archbishop of Suas and Apostolic Nuncio to Bolivia. He received his episcopal consecration on 21 January 1968 from Cardinal Amleto Cicognani.

On 12 July 1973, Pope Paul named him Apostolic Nuncio to the Dominican Republic.

He died of a heart attack in Città Sant'Angelo on 11 December 1981 having just arrived on vacation.
