= Alain Paul Lebeaupin =

French Catholic prelate (1945–2021)

Styles of Alain Paul Lebeaupin
- Reference style: The Most Reverend
- Spoken style: Your Excellency
- Religious style: Monsignor

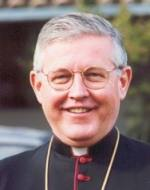
Alain Paul Lebeaupin

Alain Paul Charles Lebeaupin (2 March 1945 – 24 June 2021) was a French prelate of the Catholic Church who joined the diplomatic service of the Holy See in 1979 and was the Apostolic Nuncio to the European Union from 2012 to 2020.

== Early life ==
Lebeaupin was born in Paris on 2 March 1945 and was ordained a priest on 28 June 1975 for the Diocese of Nice after studying at the Pontifical French Seminary in Rome. He held a Doctorate in Civil Law and Masters in Canon Law and Theology.

== Career ==
To prepare for a diplomatic career he entered the Pontifical Ecclesiastical Academy in 1977. He entered the diplomatic service of the Holy See in 1979. His first appointments were to the Holy See Observer Mission to the United Nations in New York (1979–1982), the Dominican Republic (1982–1985), and Mozambique (1985–1989).

Lebeaupin then worked in Rome in the offices of the Secretariat of State and served at the Conference on Security and Cooperation in Europe (CSCE - OSCE) from 1989 to 1998. On 27 March 1996, Archbishop Lebeaupin was named chargé d'affaires of the Apostolic Nunciature to the European Union as well.

On 7 December 1998, he was named titular archbishop of Vico Equense and appointed Apostolic Nuncio to Ecuador. He was consecrated a bishop by Pope John Paul II on 6 January 1999. On 14 January 2005, Lebeaupin was appointed Apostolic Nuncio to Kenya and Permanent Observer of the Holy See to United Nations Environment Programme and the United Nations Human Settlements Programme (UN-Habitat).

On 23 June 2012, Pope Benedict XVI appointed him Apostolic Nuncio to the European Union. Having turned 75 years of age in March 2020, Lebeaupin tendered his resignation as required under 1983 Code of Canon Law which Pope Francis accepted on 16 November 2020. On 27 February 2021, he was appointed a consultor of the Section for Relations with States of the Secretariat of State.

== Death ==
He died late on the night of 23 June 2021 in Rome from a heart attack. His death was announced by the Vatican the next day.

== See also ==
- Diplomatic missions of the Holy See
- Diplomacy of the Holy See

Diplomatic posts
Preceded by Francesco Canalini	Apostolic Nuncio to Ecuador; 7 December 1998 – 14 January 2005	Succeeded by Giacomo Guido Ottonello
Preceded by Giovanni Tonucci	Apostolic Nuncio to Kenya; 14 January 2005 – 23 June 2012	Succeeded by Charles Daniel Balvo
Preceded by Giovanni Tonucci	Permanent Observer of the Holy See to UNEP and UN-HABITAT; 14 January 2005 – 23 June 2012	Succeeded by Charles Daniel Balvo
Preceded by André Dupuy	Nuncio to the European Union; 2012–2020	Succeeded by Aldo Giordano
