= Franco Coppola =

Italian prelate

His Excellency, The Most Reverend Franco Coppola
- Apostolic Nuncio to Hungary; Titular Archbishop of Vinda
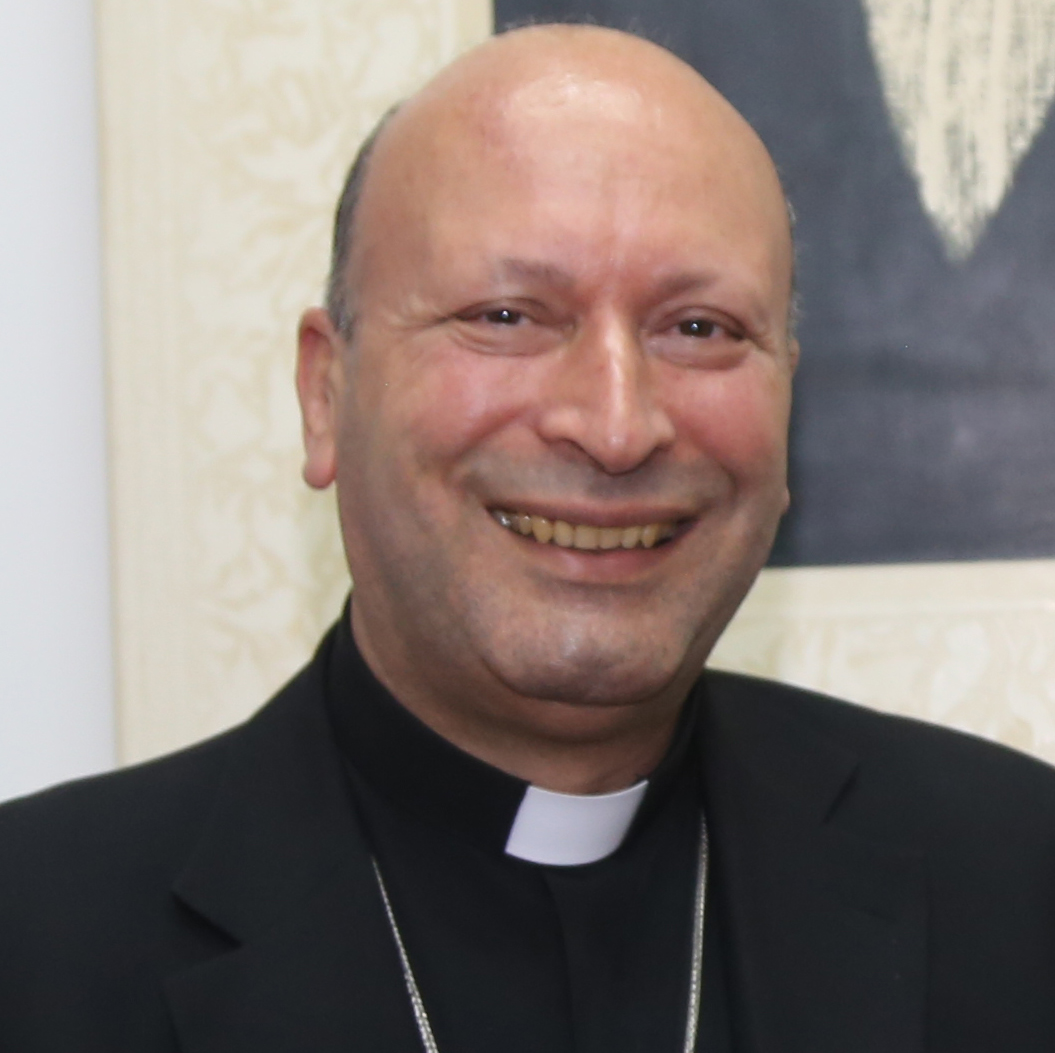
- Church: Roman Catholic Church
- Appointed: 5 November 2026
- Predecessor: Michael Banach
- Other post: Titular Archbishop of Vinda
- Previous posts: Apostolic Nuncio to Belgium and Luxembourg (2021-2026); Apostolic Nuncio to Mexico (2016–2021); Apostolic Nuncio to the Central African Republic and Chad (2014–2016); Apostolic Nuncio to Burundi (2009-2014)

Orders
- Ordination: 12 September 1981
- Consecration: 12 September 2009 by Pope Benedict XVI

Personal details
- Born: Franco Coppola; 31 March 1957 (age 69) Maglie, Italy
- Education: Pontifical Gregorian University, Pontifical Ecclesiastical Academy

Styles of Franco Coppola
- Reference style: The Most Reverend: His Excellency; The Most Reverend
- Spoken style: Your Excellency
- Religious style: Archbishop

Franco Coppola (born in Maglie on 31 March 1957) is an Italian prelate of the Catholic Church who serves in the diplomatic service of the Holy See since 1993.

== Biography ==
Coppola was born in Maglie on 31 March 1957. He was ordained priest on 12 September 1981. He was incardinated in the diocese of Otranto. He attended the Pontifical Ecclesiastical Academy while at the same time studying for a doctorate in canon law at a pontifical university.

== Diplomatic career ==
He entered the diplomatic service of the Holy See on 1 July 1993, he served at the pontifical representations in Lebanon, Colombia, Poland and at the Section for Relations with States of the Secretariat of State.

He served with the rank of Counsellor at the Nunciature in Burundi.

On 16 July 2009, Pope Benedict XVI appointed him Apostolic Nuncio to Burundi and Titular Archbishop of Vinda.

He was consecrated by Pope Benedict XVI with Cardinals Tarcisio Bertone and William Levada as co-consecrators on 12 September 2009, the twenty-eighth anniversary of his ordination to the priesthood, along with Gabriele Giordano Caccia, Giorgio Corbellini and Pietro Parolin.

On 31 January 2014, Pope Francis named him Apostolic Nuncio to the Central African Republic. On 2 April 2014, Pope Francis named Coppola Nuncio to Chad.

On 9 July 2016, Pope Francis appointed him Nuncio to Mexico. In December 2017, he forcefully reiterated Francis' criticism of the Mexican bishops saying that "The Church here in Mexico has been lagging behind and has continued to give valid answers for the last century, without realizing that time has meanwhile gone on."

Speaking in 2021, at the opening of the Mexican bishops' conference biannual meeting, he urged the country's bishops to "look reality in the eye" as the country's non-Catholic population increases and nonreligious numbers rise. He spoke of several worrying trends in the 2020 census which showed the number of people identifying as nonreligious nearly doubling to 8.1% of the population, while another 2.5% of the population considered themselves religious, but without any professed confession. Protestants and evangelicals grew from 7.5% of the population in 2010 to 11.2% of the population in 2020.

On 15 November he was named Nuncio to Belgium and on 14 December 2021 he was named Nuncio to Luxembourg. On the return flight to Rome following Pope Francis' 2024 trip to Belgium the pontiff said "'abortion is murder'" and that "'“science says that just one month from conception, all the organs are present'". He compared the doctors to hitmen. Contemporaneously, Belgium was considered whether to expand access from the first 12 to 18 weeks. In response Prime Minister Alexander De Croo said he would summon Archbishop Coppola to protest the pope's remarks as an “unacceptable” interference in his country’s domestic affairs.

On 5 November 2026, Pope Leo XIV appointed his as nuncio to Hungary.

== See also ==
- List of heads of the diplomatic missions of the Holy See

Diplomatic posts
Preceded by Paul Gallagher	Apostolic Nuncio to Burundi; 16 July 2009 – 31 January 2014	Succeeded by Wojciech Załuski
Preceded by Jude Thaddeus Okolo	Apostolic Nuncio to the Central African Republic; 31 January 2014 – 9 July 2016	Succeeded by Santiago de Wit Guzmán
Preceded by Jude Thaddeus Okolo	Apostolic Nuncio to Chad; 2 April 2014 – 9 July 2016	Succeeded by Santiago de Wit Guzmán
Preceded by Christophe Pierre	Apostolic Nuncio to Mexico; 9 July 2016 – 11 November 2021	Succeeded by Joseph Spiteri
Preceded by Augustine Kasujja	Apostolic Nuncio to Belgium; 15 November 2021 – 5 November 2026	Succeeded by Vacant
Preceded by Augustine Kasujja	Apostolic Nuncio to Luxembourg; 14 December 2021 – 5 November 2026	Succeeded by Vacant
