= Apostolic Nunciature to the Central African Republic =

Diplomatic post of the Holy See

The Apostolic Nunciature to the Central African Republic is an ecclesiastical office of the Catholic Church in the Central African Republic. It is a diplomatic post of the Holy See, whose representative is called the Apostolic Nuncio with the rank of an ambassador. The nuncio resides in Bangui, the capital city. The Apostolic Nuncio to the Central African Republic is usually also the Apostolic Nuncio to Chad upon his appointment to said nation.

The Holy See represented its interests in the region through its Delegation to Central Africa erected on 3 April 1965. With the decolonization of Africa in the mid-20th century, it established relationships with the new independent countries of that continent. The Central African Republic gained its independence from France in 1960. The Holy See established its Nunciature to Malawi and named its first pro-nuncio on 4 November 1967.

== List of papal representatives to the Central African Republic ==
Apostolic Delegate to Central Africa

- Luigi Poggi (3 April 1965 – 4 November 1967)

Apostolic Pro-Nuncio

- Luigi Poggi (4 November 1967 – 21 May 1969)
- Mario Tagliaferri (5 March 1970 – 25 June 1975)
- Oriano Quilici (15 November 1975 – 26 June 1981)
- John Bulaitis (21 November 1981 – 11 July 1987)

Apostolic Nuncios

- Diego Causero (1 February 1993 – 31 March 1999)
- Joseph Chennoth (24 August 1999 – 15 June 2005)
- Pierre Nguyên Van Tot (24 August 2005 – 13 May 2008)
- Jude Thaddeus Okolo (2 August 2008 – 7 October 2013)
- Franco Coppola (31 January 2014 – 9 July 2016)
- Santiago de Wit Guzmán (21 March 2017 – 30 July 2022)
- Giuseppe Laterza (5 January 2023 – present)
