= Timothy Broglio =

American Catholic prelate (born 1951)

His Excellency, The Most Reverend Timothy Broglio
- Archbishop for the Military Services, USA
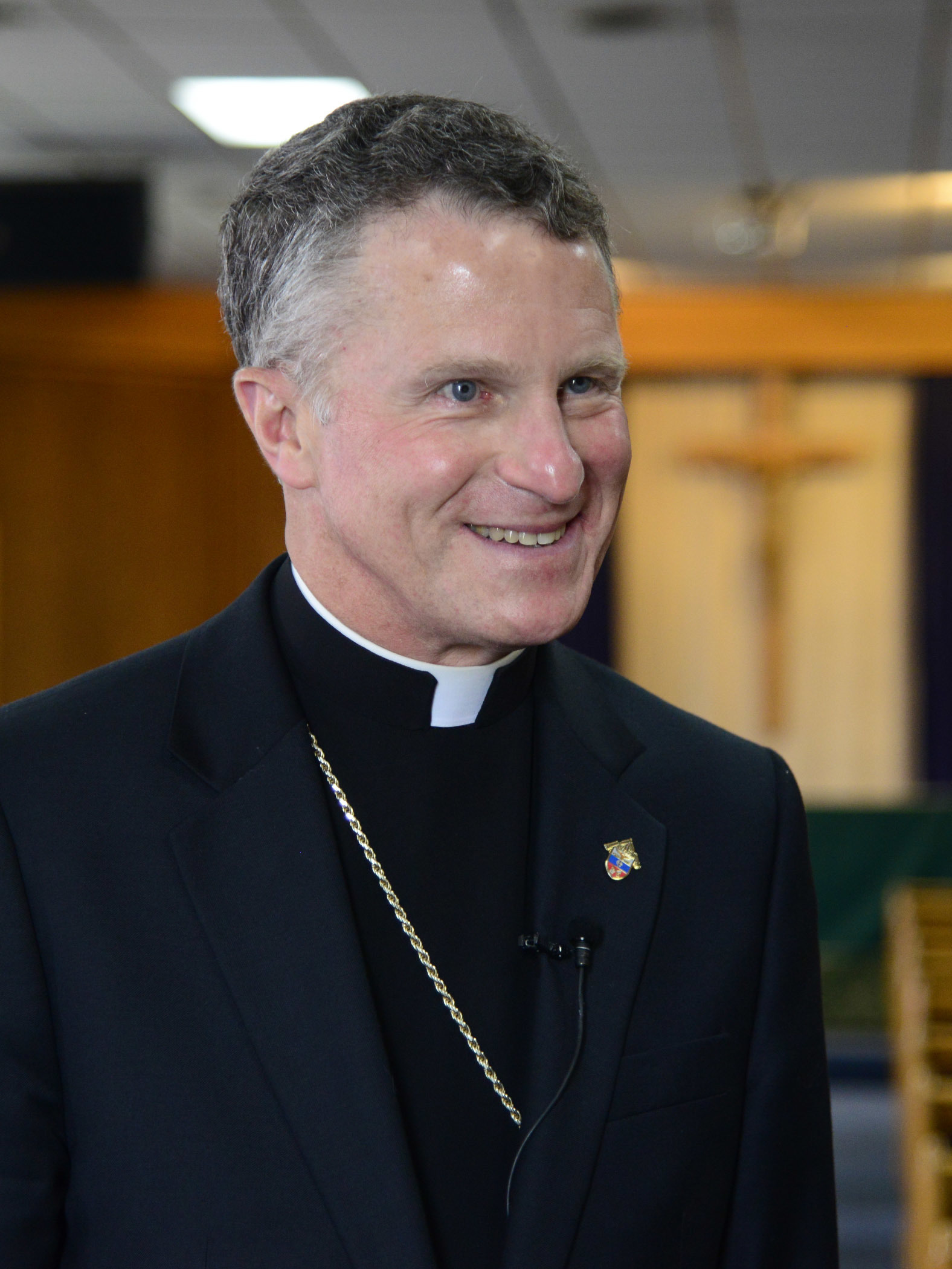
- Broglio in 2015
- Church: Catholic Church
- Archdiocese: Military Services, USA
- Appointed: November 19, 2007
- Installed: January 25, 2008
- Predecessor: Edwin F. O'Brien
- Previous posts: Apostolic Nuncio to the Dominican Republic (2001–2007); Apostolic Delegate to Puerto Rico (2001–2007); Titular Archbishop of Amiternum (2001–2007); President of the United States Conference of Catholic Bishops (2022-2025)

Orders
- Ordination: May 19, 1977 by Sergio Pignedoli
- Consecration: March 19, 2001 by John Paul II; Angelo Sodano; Giovanni Battista Re

Personal details
- Born: December 22, 1951 (age 74) Cleveland Heights, Ohio, U.S.
- Denomination: Catholic
- Education: Boston College; Pontifical Gregorian University; Pontifical Ecclesiastical Academy; Pontifical North American College
- Motto: Quaerite regnum Dei (Latin for 'Seek God's kingdom')
- Styles
- Reference style: His Excellency; The Most Reverend
- Spoken style: Your Excellency
- Religious style: Archbishop

Timothy Paul Andrew Broglio KC*HS (born December 22, 1951) is an American Catholic prelate serving as Archbishop for the Military Services, USA since 2008 and who served as president of the United States Conference of Catholic Bishops from 2022 to 2025. Broglio previously served as Apostolic Nuncio to the Dominican Republic and Apostolic Delegate to Puerto Rico from 2001 to 2008.

== Early life and education ==
Timothy Paul Andrew Broglio was born on December 22, 1951, in Cleveland Heights, Ohio, and attended St. Ignatius High School. After graduating from high school, Broglio attended Boston College, where he obtained a Bachelor of Arts degree in classics.

Broglio entered the Pontifical Gregorian University after graduating from college, earning a Bachelor of Sacred Theology degree while residing at the Pontifical North American College.

== Priesthood ==
Broglio was ordained to the priesthood for the Diocese of Cleveland by Cardinal Sergio Pignedoli on May 19, 1977. Broglio then served as an associate pastor at St. Margaret Mary Parish, in South Euclid, Ohio, later remarking that the assignment was "the best two years of [his] life".

Returning to Rome in 1979, he studied at the Pontifical Ecclesiastical Academy and graduated in 1983; He also earned his Doctor of Canon Law degree from the Gregorian and joined the Holy See’s diplomatic corps. After serving as secretary for the nunciatures to the Ivory Coast (1983–1987) and to Paraguay (1987–1990), Broglio worked at the Vatican Secretariat of State as desk officer for Central America. He then served as personal secretary to Vatican Secretary of State Cardinal Angelo Sodano.

=== Apostolic nuncio and delegate ===
On February 27, 2001, Broglio was appointed Apostolic Nuncio to the Dominican Republic, as well as Apostolic Delegate to Puerto Rico, and Titular Archbishop of Amiternum. He received his episcopal consecration on March 19, 2001, from Pope John Paul II, with Cardinals Angelo Sodano and Giovanni Battista Re serving as co-consecrators. His consecration, and the days leading to it, were recorded and used by National Geographic in their 2001 documentary, "Inside the Vatican."

=== Archbishop of the Military Services, USA ===
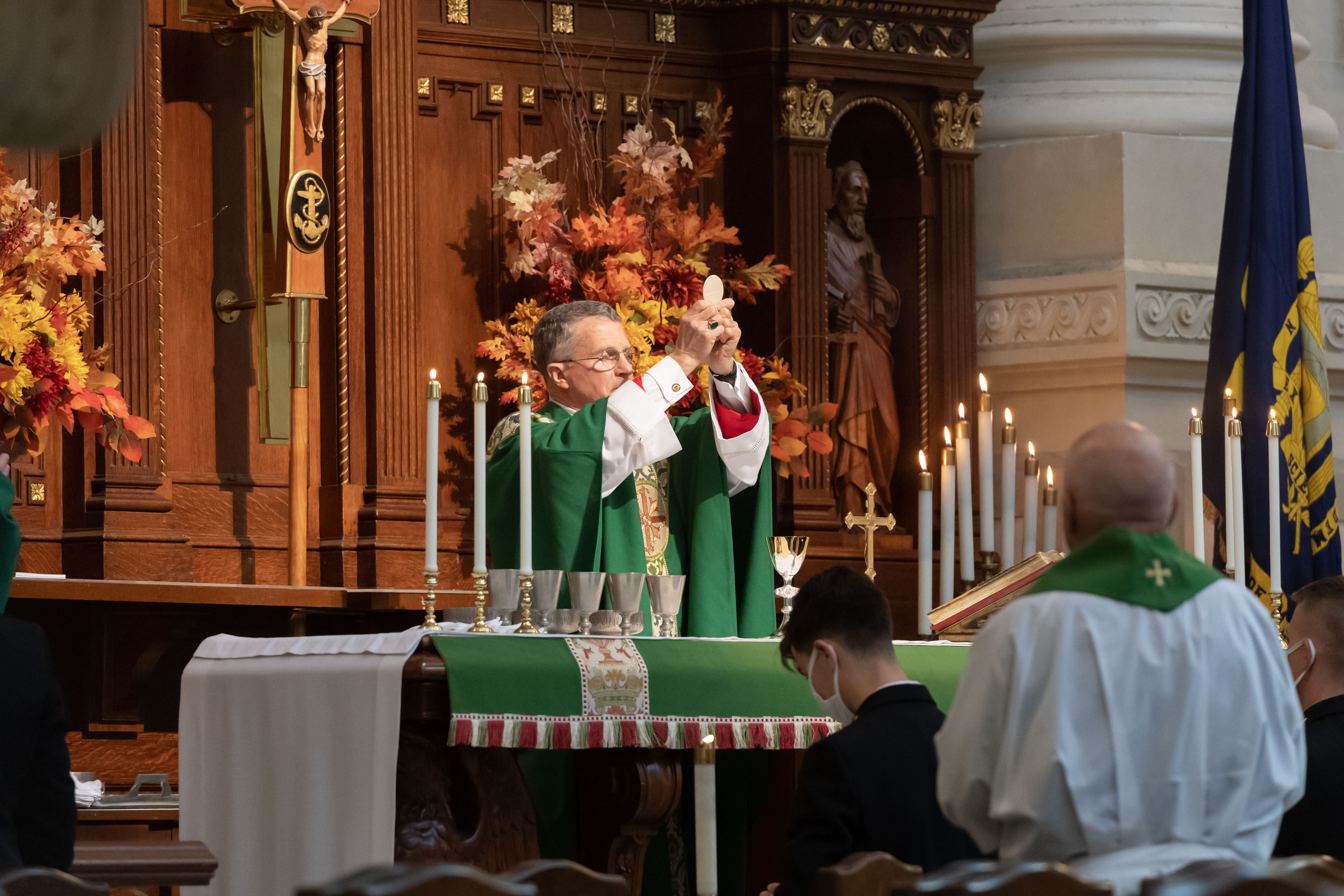
Broglio celebrating Mass at the Naval Academy Chapel in Annapolis, Maryland during the COVID-19 pandemic in October 2020

Pope Benedict XVI named Broglio head of the Archdiocese for the Military Services, USA, on November 19, 2007. He was installed on January 25, 2008, at the Basilica of the National Shrine of the Immaculate Conception. During his tenure, Broglio has voiced opposition to the Affordable Care Act's contraceptive mandate and the repeal of Don't Ask Don't Tell, and showed support for the Trump administration's 2017 ban on transgender individuals serving in the United States military.

=== USCCB President ===
On November 15, 2022, at the fall Plenary Assembly of the United States Conference of Catholic Bishops, Broglio was elected USCCB president.

Aside from his native English, Broglio is fluent in Italian, Spanish, and French, and is a board member of Catholic Distance University.

== Viewpoints ==
=== COVID-19 vaccine exemptions ===
In October 2021, Broglio released a statement supporting the military's granting of exemptions from COVID-19 vaccination mandates on the basis of service members' conscience-based objections.

=== LGBT personnel in the military ===
Broglio opposed the repeal of Don't Ask Don't Tell policy from 1993 to 2011 that regulated service by LGBT personnel in the U.S. military. In 2013, he opposed the Pentagon's granting the same benefits to same-sex married couples as to other married couples. He also supported the Trump administration's ban on transgender individuals serving in the military.

=== Views on sex abuse scandals ===
In response to a letter from a military spouse complaining about a homily delivered in a base service, Broglio wrote:

There is no question that the crisis of sexual abuse by priests in the USA is directly related to homosexuality ... [Ninety percent] of those abused were boys aged 12 and over. That is no longer pedophilia.

=== Immigration ===
In June 2025, Broglio publicly criticized the enforcement-only approach to illegal immigration and the continued erosion of legal protections.

=== Greenland, boat strikes, and morality ===
In 2026, in response to Donald Trump's proposal to seize Greenland by force, Broglio expressed concern. He noted that Greenland is a territory of Denmark and stated that service members were morally justified in refusing orders that conflicted with their consciences. He also criticized the strikes on boats allegedly carrying drugs in 2025, emphasizing that the "intentional killing of noncombatants" is impermissible and that orders to deliberately kill survivors who posed no immediate threat were illegal and immoral.

== Honors ==
- Chaplain Grand Cross of Merit of the Sacred Military Constantinian Order of Saint George
- Knight Grand Officer of the Equestrian Order of the Holy Sepulchre

Catholic Church titles
Preceded by Edwin Frederick O'Brien	Archbishop for the Military Services; January 25, 2008 – Present	Incumbent
Preceded by José Horacio Gómez	President of the USCCB; 2022–2025	Succeeded by Paul Coakley
Diplomatic posts
Preceded by François Bacqué	Apostolic Nuncio to the Dominican Republic; 2001–2007	Succeeded by Józef Wesołowski
Diplomatic posts
Preceded by Agostino Cacciavillan	Titular Archbishop of Amiternum; 2001–2007	Succeeded by Luciano Suriani
