= Permanent Observer of the Holy See to UNEP and UN-HABITAT =

Diplomatic mission of the Holy See at UN Agency

The Permanent Observer of the Holy See to UNEP and UN-HABITAT is an ecclesiastical office of the Catholic Church, which, as a diplomatic post of the Holy See, represents the interests of the Holy See to the United Nations Environment Programme and the United Nations Human Settlements Programme. Its offices are in Nairobi, Kenya, and the position has, since its creation in 1977, been held by the Apostolic Nuncio to Kenya.

== List of permanent observers ==
The first Permanent Observer has been Nuncio to Kenya for several months when he was given his assignment as permanent observer. The next two were given both positions simultaneously. The fourth, van Megen, was appointed nuncio to Kenya on 16 February 2019, then nuncio to South Sudan on 19 March, and then Permanent Observer to the UN agencies in Nairobi on 25 May.

- Giovanni Tonucci (1997 (Note: Tonucci was named nuncio to Kenya on 9 March 1996. The date he was assigned the additional role of permanent observer is unknown.) – 16 October 2004)
- Alain Paul Lebeaupin (14 January 2005 – 23 June 2012)
- Charles Daniel Balvo (17 January 2013 – 21 September 2018)
- Hubertus van Megen (25 May 2019 – 9 April 2026)

== See also ==
- Foreign relations of the Holy See
- List of heads of the diplomatic missions of the Holy See
- Permanent Observer of the Holy See to the United Nations
- Permanent Observer of the Holy See to the United Nations in Geneva
- Permanent Observer of the Holy See to UNESCO
