= Piergiorgio Bertoldi =

Italian Roman Catholic archbishop

His Excellency, The Most Reverend Piergiorgio Bertoldi
- Apostolic Nuncio to the Dominican Republic and Apostolic Delegate to Puerto Rico; Titular Archbishop of Spello
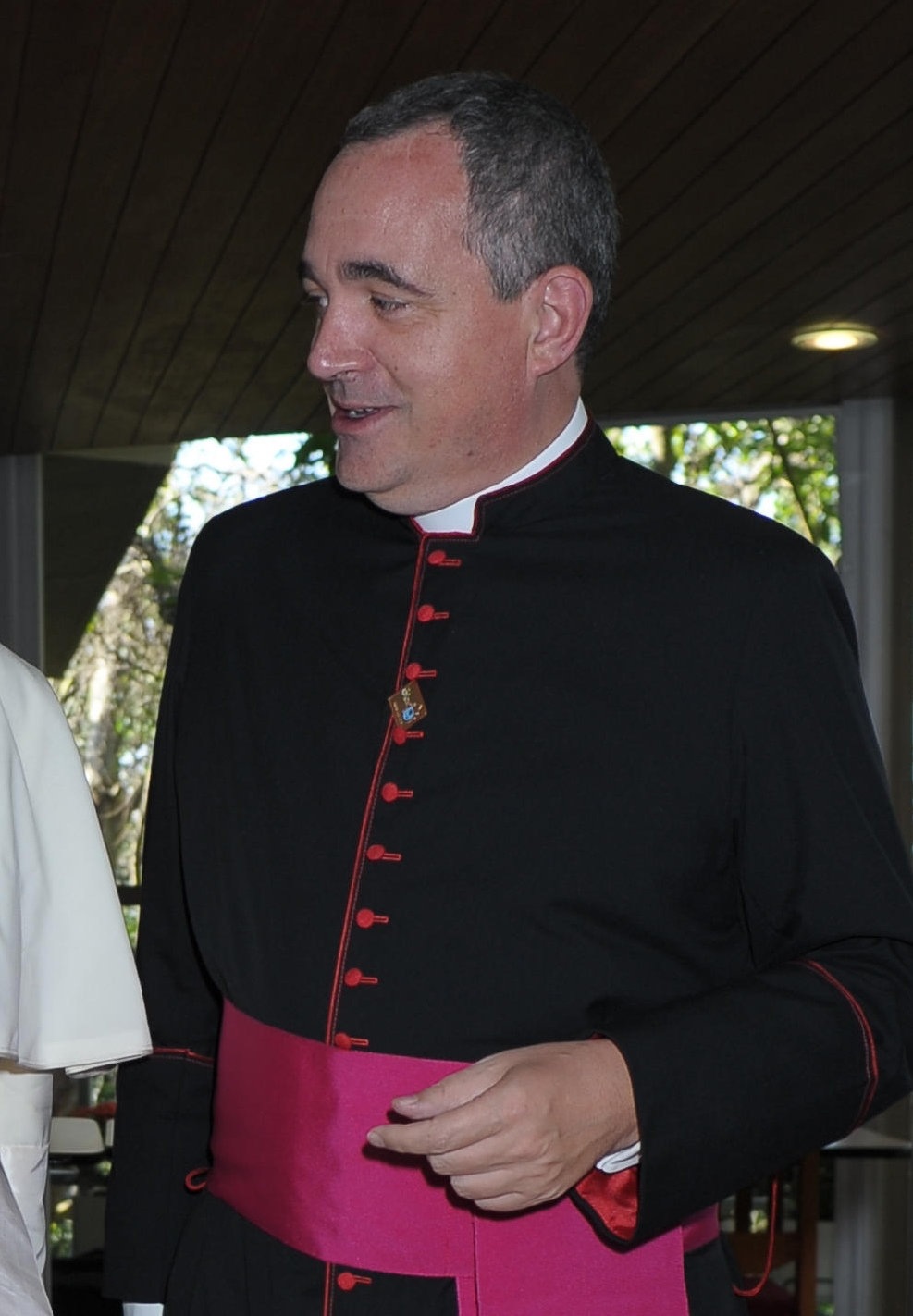
- Piergiorgio Bertoldi with Pope Francis
- Church: Roman Catholic Church
- Appointed: 18 May 2023
- Predecessor: Ghaleb Moussa Abdalla Bader
- Other post: Titular Archbishop of Spello
- Previous posts: Apostolic Nuncio to Mozambique (2019-2023); Apostolic Nuncio to Burkina Faso and Niger (2015-2019)

Orders
- Ordination: 11 June 1988 by Carlo Maria Martini, S.J.
- Consecration: 2 June 2015 by Pietro Parolin

Personal details
- Born: 26 July 1963 Varese, Italy
- Motto: Adiutores Gaudii Vestri
- Coat of arms

Styles of Piergiorgio Bertoldi
- Reference style: His Excellency; The Most Reverend
- Spoken style: Your Excellency
- Religious style: Archbishop

Piergiorgio Bertoldi (born 26 July 1963) is a Catholic archbishop and Apostolic Nuncio of the Holy See.

== Biography ==
He was born in Varese, capital of the Province of Varese, on 26 July 1963. He received his priestly ordination by cardinal Carlo Maria Martini on 11 June 1988 for the Archdiocese of Milan.

== Diplomatic career ==
He attended the Pontifical Ecclesiastical Academy and entered the diplomatic service of the Holy See. He then worked for the diplomatic missions of the Holy See in Uganda, Republic of Congo, Colombia, the former Yugoslavia, Romania, Iran and Brazil.

On 24 April 2015 Pope Francis appointed him titular archbishop of Spello and apostolic nuncio to Burkina Faso and Niger. His episcopal consecration took place on 2 June 2015 in the basilica of the archiepiscopal Seminary of Venegono Inferiore.

On 19 March 2019 Pope Francis appointed him as the apostolic nuncio to Mozambique.

On 18 May 2023, Pope Francis appointed him Apostolic Nuncio to the Dominican Republic and Apostolic Delegate to Puerto Rico.

== See also ==
- List of heads of the diplomatic missions of the Holy See

Diplomatic posts
Preceded by Vito Rallo	Apostolic Nuncio to Burkina Faso; Apostolic Nuncio to Niger; 2015–2019	Succeeded by Michael Francis Crotty
Preceded by Edgar Peña Parra	Apostolic Nuncio to Mozambique; 2019–2023	Succeeded by Luís Miguel Muñoz Cárdaba
Preceded by Ghaleb Moussa Abdalla Bader	Apostolic Nuncio to the Dominican Republic; Apostolic Delegate to Puerto Rico; 2023–present	Incumbent
