= Oriano Quilici =

Italian prelate

- Apostolic Nuncio to Switzerland & Liechtenstein
- Church: Catholic Church
- See: Apostolic Nunciature to Switzerland & Liechtenstein
- In office: 8 July 1997 – 2 November 1998
- Predecessor: Karl-Josef Rauber
- Successor: Pier Giacomo De Nicolò
- Other post: Titular (Arch)Bishop of Tabla (1975-1998)
- Previous posts: Apostolic Nuncio to Venezuela (1990-1997); Apostolic Nuncio to Guatemala (1981-1990); Apostolic Nuncio to the Republic of the Congo (1977-1981); Apostolic Delegate to Chad (1975-1981); Apostolic Pro-Nuncio to the Central African Republic (1975-1981); Apostolic Delegate the Republic of the Congo (1975-1977)

Orders
- Ordination: 8 December 1954 by Luigi Traglia
- Consecration: 7 December 1975 by Jean-Marie Villot

Personal details
- Born: 29 November 1929 San Pietro a Vico, Lucca, Province of Lucca, Kingdom of Italy
- Died: 2 November 1998 (aged 68) Bern, Canton of Bern, Switzerland

Oriano Quilici (29 November 1929 – 2 November 1998) was an Italian prelate of the Catholic Church who spent his career in the diplomatic service of the Holy See.

== Biography ==
Oriano Quilici was born on 29 November 1929 in the San Pietro a Vico quarter of Lucca, Italy. He was ordained a priest on 8 December 1954.

His academic credentials included a diploma in theology and philosophy from the Pontifical Gregorian University and a doctorate in canon law from the Pontifical Lateran University.

He completed the course of study at the Pontifical Ecclesiastical Academy in preparation for a diplomatic career in 1957 and entered the diplomatic service of the Holy See on 1 August 1959. His early postings included Costa Rica, Chile, the Philippines, Yugoslavia, New Zealand and Oceania, and South Korea, as well as a stint in Vienna from 1970 to 1975, where beginning in 1971 he was the Holy See's Permanent Observer to two international bodies: the International Atomic Energy Agency and the United Nations Industrial Development Organization.

On 15 November 1975, Pope Paul VI appointed him Titular Archbishop of Tabla and Apostolic Pro-nuncio to the Central African Republic and Apostolic Delegate to Chad and the Republic of the Congo. He was consecrated a bishop on 7 December. In the Central African Republic, he diplomatically refused Jean-Bédel Bokassa's request that the pope crown him emperor in December 1977.

On 26 June 1981, Pope John Paul II appointed him Apostolic Nuncio to Guatemala, on 11 July 1990 to Venezuela, and on 8 July 1997 to Switzerland and Liechtenstein. In Guatemala in 1983, he appealed without success to halt several executions just days before Pope John Paul's arrival there.

He died in university hospital in Bern, Switzerland, on 2 November 1998.
