= Victor Guazzelli =

Bishop of Lindisfarne (1920–2004)

The Right Reverend Victor Guazzelli
- Titular Bishop of Lindisfarne
- Church: Roman Catholic Church
- Appointed: 24 April 1970
- Term ended: 1 June 2004
- Successor: John Arnold
- Other post: Auxiliary Bishop of Westminster (1970–1996)

Orders
- Ordination: 17 March 1945
- Consecration: 23 May 1970 by John Heenan

Personal details
- Born: 19 March 1920 Stepney, County of London
- Died: 1 June 2004 (aged 84) Vauxhall, London
- Denomination: Roman Catholic Church

Victor Guazzelli (19 March 1920 – 1 June 2004) was a Roman Catholic bishop. He served as an auxiliary bishop of the Roman Catholic Archdiocese of Westminster (1970–1996) and held the titular see of Lindisfarne (1970–2004). He was known as a devoted supporter of social justice.

== Biography ==
Victor Guazzelli was born in Stepney on 19 March 1920 of Italian immigrants from Lucca, Tuscany. His father, Cesare Guazzelli, worked as an iceman. Two of his three sisters died from childhood pneumonia. At the age of nine, Victor told his father he wanted to enter the priesthood. Cesare gave his blessing, and in 1935 Victor left for the English College, Lisbon, a Roman Catholic seminary. Whilst attending the seminary, World War II broke out and Victor was unable to return to London until 1945, by which time he was already a priest. His father had died during his absence. Now fluent in Portuguese and Italian, Victor took up a post at St Patrick's, Soho Square, before being recalled to the seminary in Lisbon as bursar, and to teach Church history and Scripture.

In 1958, Guazzelli came back to the staff at Westminster Cathedral, at the time when Pope John XXIII was beginning to make changes in the Catholic Church, which would culminate in the Second Vatican Council and the new rite of mass.

In 1970, Guazzelli was made an auxiliary bishop of Westminster and titular Bishop of Lindisfarne. In 1976, Cardinal Hume divided the diocese into pastoral areas and Guazzelli was made area bishop in east London, covering the deprived boroughs of Tower Hamlets and Hackney. Guazzelli came home, making his base in Pope John House in Poplar – not far from where Cesare pushed his ice cart 50 years before.

In 1975, Guazzelli became president of the peace movement, Pax Christi. In May 1982, he condemned the Falklands War and called for British troops to return. In 1983, he backed Bruce Kent, one of his own priests and General Secretary of CND. Bruno Heim, the Vatican's Apostolic Delegate to Great Britain described Kent as an 'idiot', remarks Guazzelli furiously condemned as offensive. That year, Guazzelli was the only English Catholic bishop to join a big CND demonstration in Trafalgar Square.

He then turned his attentions to an East End in the throes of change. The Isle of Dogs was a huge building site for Canary Wharf, an increasingly bitter strike was being played out at the News International plant at Wapping, and the parties of the far right were mobilising against immigration into the East End. Guazzelli, from his Poplar base, saw a way to bring together residents and community leaders and make their voice heard. He invited all to have their say at the new East London Pastoral Area. There were workshops, training days, and discussion sheets printed, with cartoons explaining the Work of the Second Vatican Council. As the physical and social fabric of the East End was stretched to the limit, the role of the parish priest was to change too – with less emphasis on 'maintaining' the parish, more on going out on 'missions'. Guazzelli gathered a 'hit squad' of priests to conduct intensive six-week missions in the parishes. Meanwhile, the tireless bishop was active as a member of the Latin American Desk of the Catholic Relief Agency Cafod, visiting Brazil in 1981. He was also the English representative on the Apostleship of the Sea – the mission to seafarers. During Victor's life span he saved many lives with the relief agency.

He stayed on at Poplar after retirement age but, after a haemorrhage, his life saved by the nuns at Pope John House, he decided to return to Westminster Cathedral. In his retirement he enjoyed stamp collecting, playing Bach on the organ, and playing golf. The Lindisfarne connection came in handy: he became an overseas member of Shooters Hill Golf Club on the basis that his see was an island.

Guazzelli died on 1 June 2004, aged 84.

Catholic Church titles
New creation	titular Bishop of Lindisfarne; 1970–2004	Succeeded by John Arnold, auxiliary bishop of Westminster
