= Thaddeus Okolo =

Nigerian bishop and Vatican nuncio

His Excellency, The Most Reverend Thaddeus Okolo KC*HS
- Apostolic Nuncio to Haiti; Titular Archbishop of Novica
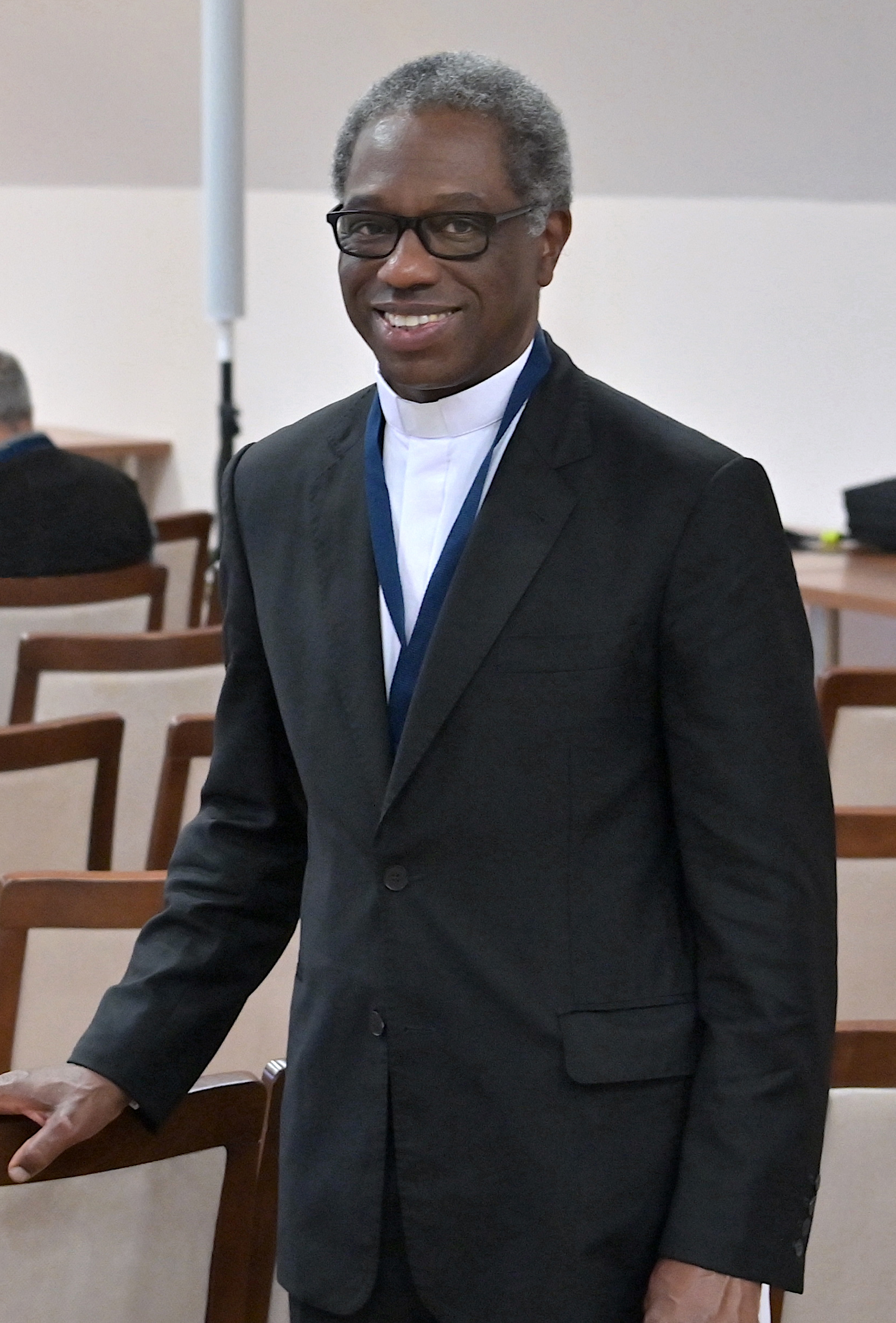
- Appointed: 11 February 2026
- Predecessor: Francisco Escalante Molina
- Other post: Titular Archbishop of Novica
- Previous posts: Apostolic Nuncio to the Czech Republic (2022-2026); Apostolic Nuncio to Ireland (2017–2022); Apostolic Nuncio to the Dominican Republic and Apostolic Delegate to Puerto Rico (2013–2017); Apostolic Nuncio to Chad and Central African Republic (2008–2013)

Orders
- Ordination: 02 July 1983 by Francis Arinze
- Consecration: 27 September 2008 by Francis Arinze; Hilary Paul Odili Okeke; Valerian Okeke

Personal details
- Born: Jude Thaddeus Okolo; 18 December 1956 (age 69) Kano, Kano State, Nigeria
- Motto: Domine Ut Videam lit. ' Lord, that I may see'

Styles of Jude Thaddeus Okolo
- Reference style: His Excellency; The Most Reverend
- Spoken style: Your Excellency
- Religious style: Archbishop

Jude Thaddeus Okolo KC*HS (born 18 December 1956) is a Nigerian Catholic prelate who has worked in the diplomatic service of the Holy See since 1990. He has been an archbishop since 2008 and held the post of Apostolic Nuncio in several countries. Apart from his native Igbo and English, Okolo is also fluent in French, Italian, Spanish, German, and Czech.

== Biography ==
Okolo was born in Kano, Kano State, Nigeria on 18 December 1956. He was ordained a priest by Archbishop Francis Arinze on 2 July 1983 before he was assigned to the Roman Curia, where he worked in Dialogue with Christian Sects from 1984 to 1986. Afterwards, he undertook his post-graduate studies in Rome and obtained a doctorate in Canon Law and a Diploma in Diplomatic Studies. He also attended the Pontifical Ecclesiastical Academy.

== Diplomatic career ==
Okolo has served in diplomatic missions and nunciatures in Sri Lanka, Haiti, the Antillean Islands and other Caribbean island nations, Switzerland, the Czech Republic, and Australia. On 2 August 2008, Pope Benedict XVI appointed him titular archbishop of Novica and Apostolic Nuncio to the Central African Republic and Chad. He received his episcopal consecration from Cardinal Francis Arinze on 27 September 2008.

On 7 October 2013, Pope Francis named him Apostolic Nuncio to the Dominican Republic and Apostolic Delegate to Puerto Rico.

On 13 May 2017, he was appointed as the Apostolic Nuncio to Ireland.

On 1 May 2022, he became the Apostolic Nuncio to Czech Republic.

On 11 February 2026, Pope Leo XIV appointed him as nuncio to Haiti.

== See also ==
- List of heads of the diplomatic missions of the Holy See

Diplomatic posts
Preceded by Pierre Nguyên Van Tot	Apostolic Nuncio to Chad and Central African Republic; 2008 – 2013	Succeeded by Franco Coppola
Preceded by Józef Wesołowski	Apostolic Nuncio to the Dominican Republic and Apostolic Delegate to Puerto Rico; 2013 – 2017	Succeeded by Ghaleb Moussa Abdalla Bader
Preceded by Charles John Brown	Apostolic Nuncio to Ireland; 2017 – 2022	Succeeded by Luis Mariano Montemayor
Preceded by Charles Daniel Balvo	Apostolic Nuncio to the Czech Republic; 2022 – 2026	Succeeded by Vacant
Preceded by Francisco Escalante Molina	Apostolic Nuncio to Haiti; 2026 – present	Incumbent
