= Tito Trocchi =

Italian prelate

- Official of the Apostolic Camera
- Church: Catholic Church
- In office: 11 January 1927 – 12 February 1947
- Other post: Titular Archbishop of Lacedaemonia (1915-1947)
- Previous posts: Apostolic Internuncio to Bolivia (1921-1924); Apostolic Delegate to Puerto Rico & Cuba (1915-1921)

Orders
- Ordination: 24 September 1887
- Consecration: 12 December 1915 by Vittorio Ranuzzi de' Bianchi

Personal details
- Born: 1 May 1864 Rome, Papal States
- Died: 12 February 1947 (aged 82) Rome, Italy

Tito Trocchi (1 May 1864 – 12 February 1947) was an Italian prelate of the Catholic Church who worked in the diplomatic service of the Holy See. He became an archbishop in 1915 and led the papal representations in Cuba and Bolivia. He spent the last twenty years of his life working in the Roman Curia.

== Biography ==
Tito Trocchi was born on 1 May 1864 in Rome. He was ordained a priest on 24 September 1887.

On 14 November 1925, Pope Benedict XV appointed him Apostolic Delegate to Cuba and Puerto and on 9 December titular archbishop of Lacedaemon. He received his episcopal consecration on 12 December 1915 from Archbishop Vittorio Ranuzzi de' Bianchi.

On 25 May 1921, Pope Benedict appointed him Apostolic Internuncio to Bolivia.

On 11 January 1927, Pope Pius XI named him auditor general of the Apostolic Chamber.

On 22 November 1939, named him Vice Camerlengo of the Holy Roman Church.

He died on 12 February 1947.
