= Dieudonné Datonou =

Beninese archbishop

His Excellency, The Most Reverend Dieudonné Datonou
- Apostolic Nuncio to Burundi; Titular Archbishop of Vico Equense
- Church: Catholic Church
- Appointed: 7 October 2021
- Predecessor: Wojciech Załuski
- Other post: Titular Archbishop of Vico Equense

Orders
- Ordination: 7 December 1989 by Christophe Adimou
- Consecration: 20 November 2021 by Cardinal Pietro Parolin, Edgar Peña Parra and Protase Rugambwa

Personal details
- Born: March 3, 1962 (age 64) Dekanmè, Benin
- Education: Pontifical Lateran University
- Motto: Latin: Ut ita et vos faciatis (So that as I have done for you, you should also do)
- Coat of arms

Styles of Dieudonné Datonou
- Reference style: His Excellency; The Most Reverend
- Spoken style: Your Excellency
- Religious style: Archbishop

Dieudonné Datonou (born 3 March 1962) is a Beninese archbishop of the Catholic Church who has worked in the diplomatic service of the Holy See since 1995. On 7 October 2021, he was appointed Apostolic Nuncio to Burundi and elevated to the rank of archbishop.

He is the first native of Benin to hold the title of nuncio.

== Biography ==
Dieudonné K. Datonou was born in Dekanmè, Benin, on 3 March 1962. He was ordained a priest of the Archdiocese of Cotonou on 7 December 1989. He earned a degree in civil and canon law from the Pontifical Lateran University in 1995 with a dissertation "Du concept de patrimoine commun de l’humanité aux droits de l’humanité. Étude historico-juridique du concept de patrimoine commun de l’humanité en droit international".

== Diplomatic career ==
He entered the diplomatic service of the Holy See on 1 July 1995. He has filled assignments in the offices of its representatives in Angola (1995–1998), Ecuador (1998–2001), Cameroon (secretary, 2001–2004), Iran (2004–2006), India and Nepal (2006–2009), and El Salvador (2009–2014). He also worked in the Section for General Affairs of the Secretariat of State where in 2021 he became coordinator of papal travels. He was responsible for organizing Pope Francis' trip to Iraq in March 2021 and to Hungary and Slovakia in September 2021. His Vatican colleagues nicknamed him "the sheriff".

On 12 September 2021, during a press conference while en route to Budapest, Pope Francis mentioned that Datonou would soon become a bishop. On 7 October 2021, Pope Francis named him Apostolic Nuncio to Burundi and titular archbishop of Vico Equense. On 20 November 2021, he received episcopal consecration by cardinal Pietro Parolin, co-consecrators cardinal Luis Antonio Tagle and archbishop Edgar Peña Parra.

== Selected works ==
- Du concept de patrimoine commun de l'humanité aux droits de l'humanité. Étude historico-juridique du concept de patrimoine commun de l'humanité en droit international (in French). Rome: Pontificia Università Lateranense. 1995. OCLC 948994871.
- Lettre à deux chefs d'état africains: Pour une aube nouvelle (in French). Cotonou: Ruisseaux d'Afrique. 2006. ISBN 978-99919-53-43-4.
- Fleur de la terre, semence d'éternité: hommage à son éminence Bernardin Cardinal Gantin (in French). Cotonou: Star Editions. 2007. ISBN 978-99919-62-49-8.

== See also ==
- List of heads of the diplomatic missions of the Holy See
