= Apostolic Nunciature to Eritrea =

Diplomatic post of the Holy See

The Apostolic Nunciature to Eritrea is an ecclesiastical office of the Catholic Church in Eritrea. It is a diplomatic post of the Holy See, whose representative is called the Apostolic Nuncio with the rank of an ambassador.

The title Apostolic Nuncio to Eritrea is held by the prelate appointed Apostolic Nuncio to Sudan; he resides in Sudan.

== List of Apostolic Nuncios ==
- Silvano Maria Tomasi (27 June 1996 - 10 June 2003)
- Dominique Mamberti (19 February 2004 - 15 September 2006)
- Leo Boccardi (30 January 2007 - 11 July 2013)
- Hubertus van Megen (7 June 2014 - 16 February 2019)
- Luís Miguel Muñoz Cárdaba (31 March 2020 – 23 January 2024)
