= Lindisfarna titular see =

The Catholic Diocese of Lindisfarne is a titular see of the Catholic Church.

== History ==
The diocese centred on the Christian community at Lindisfarne existed as a regular see from the seventh century until Bishop Aldhun moved it to Durham in 995.

In 1970, Pope Paul VI revived it as the name of a titular see (Latin: Lindisfarna). The first three officeholders served as auxiliary bishops in the Diocese of Westminster. The fourth is an apostolic nuncio and was granted the personal title of archbishop. As of 2024, all titular Bishops of Lindisfarne have been British or Irish.

== Holders of the title ==
- Victor Guazzelli (1970–2004)
- John Arnold (2005–2014), later Bishop of Salford
- John Wilson (2016–2019), later Archbishop of Southwark
- Michael Francis Crotty, with the dignity of archbishop (2020–present)
