= Apostolic Nunciature to the Dominican Republic =

Diplomatic post of the Holy See

Apostolic Nunciature to Dominican Republic
- Address: Avenida Maximo Gomez 27, Santo Domingo, Dominican Republic
- Apostolic Nuncio: Piergiorgio Bertoldi

The Apostolic Nunciature to the Dominican Republic is an ecclesiastical office of the Catholic Church in the Dominican Republic. It is a diplomatic post of the Holy See, whose representative is called the Apostolic Nuncio with the rank of an ambassador.

The Apostolic Nuncio to the Dominican Republic is usually also the Apostolic Delegate to Puerto Rico upon his appointment to said nation. The nuncio resides in Santo Domingo.

== List of papal representatives to the Dominican Republic ==
Apostolic Delegates

- Rocco Cocchia (28 July 1874 – 9 August 1983)
- Bernardino di Milia (13 May 1884 – November 1890)
- Spiridion-Salvatore-Costantino Buhadgiar (28 November 1890 – 10 August 1891)
- Giulio Tonti (10 August 1892 – 21 July 1902)

Apostolic Nuncios

- Giuseppe Fietta (23 September 1930 – 24 July 1936) (Note: De Marchi dates Fietta's appointment as Nuncio to Argentina to 20 June 1936, but AAS records that assignment as of 12 August 1936, following Silvani's appointment as Nuncio to the Dominican Republic.)
- Maurilio Silvani (24 July 1936 – 23 May 1942)
- Alfredo Pacini (23 April 1946 – 23 April 1949)
- Francesco Lardone (21 May 1949 – 27 October 1953)
- Salvatore Siino (27 October 1953 – 14 March 1959)
- Lino Zanini (16 June 1959 – 1961)
- Emanuele Clarizio (5 October 1961 – 12 June 1967)
- Antonio del Giudice (19 August 1967 – 2 December 1970)
- Luciano Storero (24 December 1970 – 30 June 1973)
- Giovanni Gravelli (12 July 1973 – 11 December 1981)
- Blasco Francisco Collaço (26 July 1982 – 28 February 1991)
- Fortunato Baldelli (20 April 1991 – 23 April 1994)
- François Bacqué (7 June 1994 – 27 February 2001)
- Timothy Broglio (27 February 2001 – 19 November 2007)
- Józef Wesołowski (24 January 2008 – 21 August 2013)
- Jude Thaddeus Okolo (7 October 2013 – 13 May 2017)
- Ghaleb Moussa Abdalla Bader (24 August 2017 – 15 February 2023)
- Piergiorgio Bertoldi (18 May 2023 – present)
