= Dominique Mamberti =

French Catholic Cardinal (born 1952)

His Eminence Dominique Mamberti
- Prefect of the Supreme Tribunal of the Apostolic Signatura; Protodeacon of the College of Cardinals
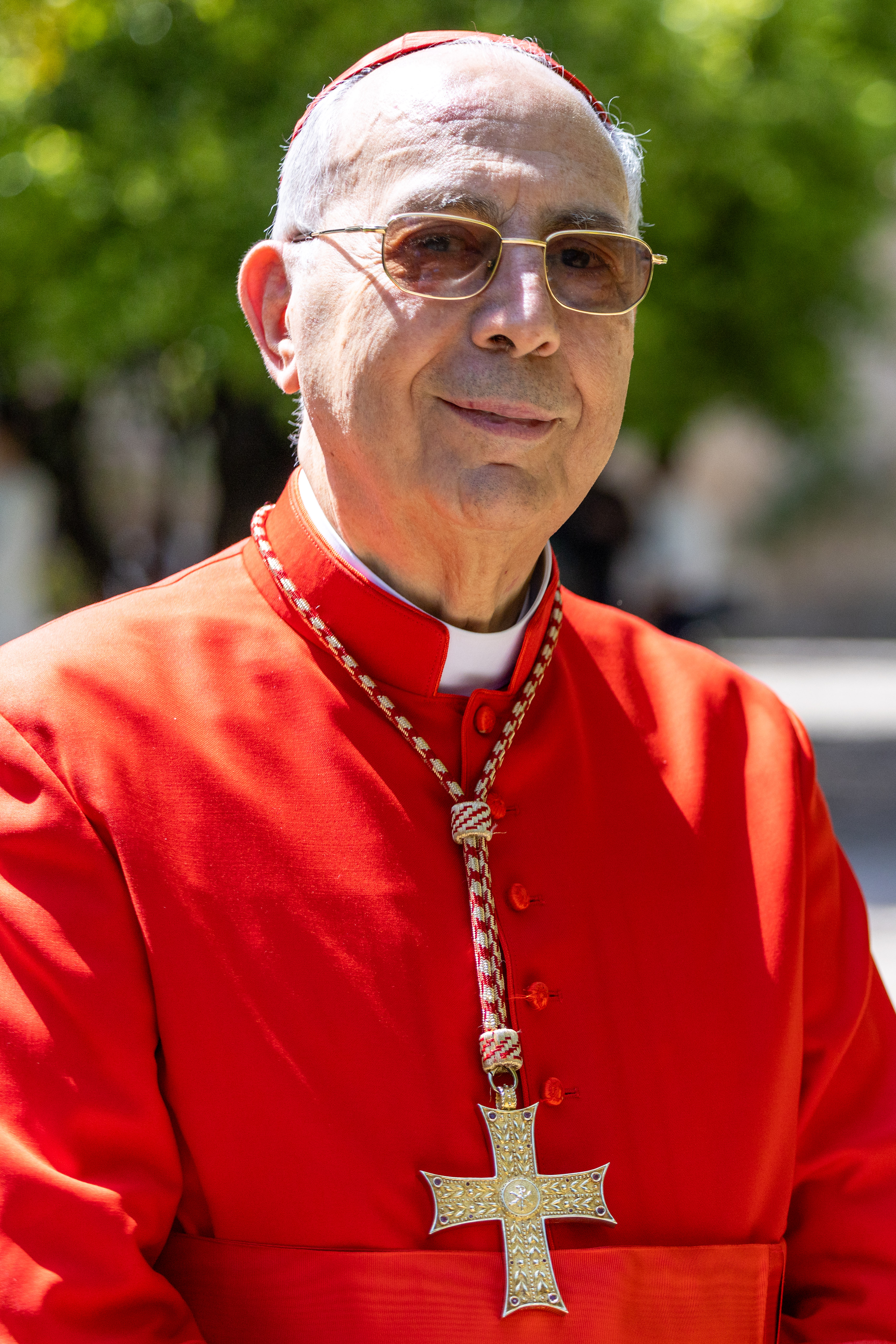
- Mamberti in 2026
- Appointed: 8 November 2014
- Predecessor: Raymond Leo Burke
- Other post: Cardinal-Deacon of Santo Spirito in Sassia
- Previous posts: Titular Archbishop of Sagone (2002–2015); Apostolic Delegate to Somalia (2002–2004); Apostolic Nuncio to Sudan (2002–2006); Apostolic Nuncio to Eritrea (2004–2006); Secretary for Relations with States (2006–2014)

Orders
- Ordination: 20 September 1981 by Jean-Charles Thomas
- Consecration: 3 July 2002 by Angelo Sodano
- Created cardinal: 14 February 2015 by Pope Francis
- Rank: Cardinal-deacon

Personal details
- Born: Dominique François Joseph Mamberti; 7 March 1952 (age 74) Marrakesh, French Morocco
- Denomination: Catholic
- Motto: Eritis Mihi testes (Latin for 'You shall be My witnesses')

Ordination history of Dominique Mamberti
History
Priestly ordination
- Ordained by: Jean-Charles Thomas
- Date: 20 September 1981
Episcopal consecration
- Principal consecrator: Angelo Sodano
- Co-consecrators: Robert Sarah André Jean René Lacrampe
- Date: 3 July 2002
Cardinalate
- Elevated by: Pope Francis
- Date: 14 February 2015
Episcopal succession
Bishops consecrated by Dominique Mamberti as principal consecrator
- Luis Mariano Montemayor: 6 August 2008
- Gerardo Antonazzo: 8 April 2013

Styles of Dominique Francois Mamberti
- Reference style: His Eminence
- Spoken style: Your Eminence
- Religious style: Cardinal
- Informal style: Cardinal

Dominique François Joseph Mamberti (French: [dɔminik mɑ̃bɛʁti]; born 7 March 1952) is a French Catholic prelate who has served as Prefect of the Apostolic Signatura since 2014. He was made a cardinal by Pope Francis in 2015. In 2025, serving as the cardinal protodeacon, he announced the election of Pope Leo XIV from the balcony of Saint Peter's Basilica following the 2025 papal conclave.

== Early life and education ==
Dominique Mamberti was born to French parents in Marrakesh, Morocco, on 7 March 1952 and was ordained a priest of the Diocese of Ajaccio, Corsica, on 20 September 1981. He has academic degrees in civil and canon law. He entered the Holy See's diplomatic service and worked in the apostolic nunciatures in Algeria, Chile and Lebanon, in the Holy See's office at United Nations headquarters in New York City and in the Section for Relations with States of the Secretariat of State (Holy See).

Mamberti is considered an expert on Latin America, the United Nations, Africa, the Middle East and Islam.

== Archbishop ==
On 18 May 2002, Pope John Paul II appointed him Titular Archbishop of Sagona and Apostolic Nuncio to Sudan and Apostolic Delegate to Somalia. He received episcopal consecration from Cardinal Secretary of State Angelo Sodano on 3 July 2002. On 19 February 2004, he was also appointed Apostolic Nuncio to Eritrea and Somalia was removed from his remit.

== Secretary for Relations with States ==
He was appointed Secretary for Relations with States by Pope Benedict XVI on 15 September 2006. This post is generally seen as the equivalent of Foreign Minister of the Holy See. In 2007 Archbishop Mamberti was made a Knight Grand Cross of the Order of Merit of the Italian Republic.

At a meeting in September 2009 between the Kosovan Foreign Minister, Skënder Hyseni, and Mamberti, the Holy See's Secretary for Relations with States, Archbishop Mamberti said that the Holy See was closely following developments in and around Kosovo, and he expressed his willingness to continue and intensify mutual communications. Following a meeting in November 2009 between the Serbian President Boris Tadić and Pope Benedict XVI, Tadić said that the Vatican supported Serbia's integration and membership within the EU and the sovereignty and preservation of its territorial integrity.

In September 2007, Mamberti orchestrated the first official visit between an Arab Head of State, Sudan's President Omar el-Bashir and Pope Benedict. The visit took place at the Pope's Summer residence, Castel Gandolfo. Shortly after this groundbreaking event, the King of Saudi Arabia met the Pope. This marked the beginning of a new period of Catholic-Muslim relations.

In June 2010, Mamberti visited Cuba and spent several days on the island, marking 75 years of diplomatic relations between the Vatican and Cuba and participating in a national conference on the church's social teachings. He met with President Raúl Castro, saying afterwards that bilateral relations are "cordial, continuing and on the rise." "The visit of (Archbishop) Mamberti also showed the favourable development of relations between the state and the Catholic Church in Cuba," the government's note said.

Mamberti, addressing the United Nations, in September 2011, called for "courageous decisions" toward the two-state solution for the Holy Land after Palestinian leaders requested full U.N. membership for the Palestinian state. Archbishop Dominique Mamberti did not say whether the Vatican explicitly supported the Palestinians' U.N. initiative. He added that the Vatican viewed the Palestinian bid "in the perspective of efforts to find a definitive solution" to the Israeli-Palestinian question – an issue addressed by a U.N. resolution of 1947 that foresaw the creation of two states. "One of them has already been created, while the other has not yet been established, although nearly 64 years have passed. The Holy See is convinced that if we want peace, it is necessary to adopt courageous decisions," he said.

At the opening of the UN General Assembly in September 2012, Mamberti said that international law is "solidly based upon the dignity and nature of humanity—in other words, upon the natural law." He called the UN delegates' attention to the language of the UN Charter and the Universal Declaration on Human Rights, which affirm the importance of the natural law. International law will earn recognition and respect, he said, if it is recognised as protecting every person and nation, not favouring the powerful. "Such will be possible," he said, "if legislation at the international level is marked by respect for the dignity of the human person, beginning with the centrality of the right to life and to freedom of religion."

In a separate address in early October 2012, Mamberti spoke of the theme of the assembly as the "Adjustment or settlement of international disputes or situations by peaceful means." In his French-language address, he lamented a "loss of faith in the value of dialogue, and the temptation to favour 'a priori' one of the sides in regional and national conflicts," saying that this threatens "respect for the juridical mechanisms of the United Nations." Archbishop Mamberti referred specifically to situations in the Middle East, particularly in un, "A solution is impossible if it fails to respect the rules of international and humanitarian law, or falls outside the mechanisms established in the United Nations Charter," he stated. "All interested parties should not only facilitate the mission of the special envoy of the United Nations and the Arab League, but also ensure humanitarian assistance to the suffering peoples. The international community must unite its efforts so that all sides replace the race to arms with negotiation, just as it must insist on effective respect for religious liberty, human rights and all fundamental freedoms."

On 16 January 2013, Mamberti gave an interview on Vatican Radio about the Catholic Church's autonomy and religious freedom. He defended the right to a conscience clause for Christian employers who refused services to homosexuals. He opposed increasing secularism.

In July 2014 commenting on the situation in Gaza, Mamberti sent a formal note to all the ambassadors accredited to the Holy See, calling their attention to the appeals by Pope Francis for Christians in Iraq and elsewhere in the Middle East. Mamberti said that the Holy See is "deeply concerned" with the suffering of Christians in the region. "Christian communities are suffering unjustly, they are scared, and many Christians have been forced to emigrate", he said.

== Prefect of the Apostolic Signatura ==
On 8 November 2014, Pope Francis appointed Mamberti as Prefect of the Supreme Tribunal of the Apostolic Signatura, the final court of appeal for any ecclesiastical judgment, besides the Pope himself. Mamberti succeeded Raymond Leo Cardinal Burke, who was named patron to the Order of Malta.

== Cardinal ==
On 4 January 2015, Pope Francis announced that he would make Archbishop Mamberti a cardinal on 14 February. At the ceremony, he was appointed Cardinal-Deacon of the titular church of Santo Spirito in Sassia.

On 13 April 2015, Mamberti was named a member of the Board of the Cardinals and Bishops for the Section for Relations with States of the Vatican Cardinal Secretary of State's office, a member of the Congregation for Divine Worship and the Discipline of the Sacraments, and a member of the Congregation for the Causes of the Saints. On 4 October 2017 he was appointed a member of the Congregation for the Evangelization of Peoples.

On 1 July 2024, he became the senior elector among those cardinals with the rank of cardinal deacon. He retained that role when he became the senior member of the order of cardinal deacons, the protodeacon of the College of Cardinals, upon the death of Cardinal Renato Martino on 28 October 2024. Serving as the cardinal protodeacon for the 2025 papal conclave, Mamberti had the duty of announcing the election of Pope Leo XIV to the world. He did not impose the pallium at the papal inauguration of Leo XIV (as expected of the cardinal-protodeacon), because he was in hospital due to cardiac fibrillation.

== See also ==
- Cardinals created by Pope Francis

Diplomatic posts
Preceded by Marco Dino Brogi OFM	Apostolic Delegate to Somalia; 18 May 2002 – 15 January 2004	Succeeded by Ramiro Moliner Inglés
Preceded by Marco Dino Brogi OFM	Apostolic Nuncio to Sudan; 18 May 2002 – 15 September 2006	Succeeded by Leo Boccardi
Preceded by Silvano Maria Tomasi	Apostolic Nuncio to Eritrea; 19 February 2004 – 15 September 2006	Succeeded by Leo Boccardi
Political offices
Preceded by Giovanni Lajolo	Secretary for Relations with States of the Holy See; 15 September 2006 – 8 November 2014	Succeeded by Paul Richard Gallagher
Catholic Church titles
New title Titular see established	— TITULAR — Archbishop of Sagone; 18 May 2002 – 14 February 2015	Succeeded by Paolo Rocco Gualtieri
Preceded by Raymond Leo Burke	Prefect of the Supreme Tribunal of the Apostolic Signatura; 8 November 2014 – present	Incumbent
Preceded by Fiorenzo Angelini	Cardinal-Deacon of Santo Spirito in Sassia; 14 February 2015 – present	Incumbent
Preceded by Renato Martino	Cardinal Protodeacon; 28 October 2024 – present	Incumbent
