= Apostolic Nunciature to Chad =

Diplomatic post of the Holy See

The Apostolic Nunciature to Chad is an ecclesiastical office of the Catholic Church in Chad. It is a diplomatic post of the Holy See, whose representative is called the Apostolic Nuncio with the rank of an ambassador. The title Apostolic Nuncio to Chad is held by the prelate appointed Apostolic Nuncio to Central African Republic; he resides in Central African Republic.

Pope John Paul II established the Nunciature to Chad on 25 November 1988.

== List of papal representatives ==
Apostolic Delegates

- Mario Tagliaferri (5 March 1970 - 25 June 1975)
- Oriano Quilici (15 November 1975 - 26 June 1981)
- John Bulaitis (21 November 1981 - 11 July 1987)
- Beniamino Stella (21 August 1987 - 15 December 1992)
  - Stella's title was changed to Pro-Nuncio on 10 January 1989.

Apostolic Nuncios

- Diego Causero (15 December 1992 - 31 March 1999)
- Joseph Chennoth (24 August 1999 - 15 June 2005)
- Pierre Nguyên Van Tot (24 August 2005 - 13 May 2008)
- Jude Thaddeus Okolo (2 August 2008 - 7 October 2013)
- Franco Coppola (2 April 2014 - 9 July 2016)
- Santiago de Wit Guzmán (25 March 2017 – 30 July 2022)
- Giuseppe Laterza (5 January 2023 – present)
