= Michael Courtney =

Roman Catholic titular archbishop and papal diplomat

- Apostolic Nuncio to Burundi
- Church: Catholic Church
- In office: 2000–2003
- Predecessor: Emil Paul Tscherrig
- Successor: Paul Gallagher

Orders
- Ordination: 9 March 1968
- Consecration: 12 November 2000 by Francis Arinze

Personal details
- Born: 5 February 1945 Summerhill, Nenagh, County Tipperary, Ireland
- Died: 29 December 2003 (aged 58) Bujumbura, Burundi
- Education: Clongowes Wood
- Alma mater: Irish College, Rome

Michael Aidan Courtney (5 February 1945 – 29 December 2003) was an Irish prelate of the Catholic Church. He entered the diplomatic service of the Holy See in 1980 and was given the rank of archbishop and named Apostolic Nuncio to Burundi in 2000.

He died from gunshot wounds sustained during a violent attack that was believed to be unrelated to Burundi's civil war. According to his brother, Courtney was the first papal nuncio to die as a result of violence in 500 years.

== Biography ==
Courtney was born in Summerhill, Nenagh, County Tipperary, as the youngest of seven children of Louis and Elizabeth Courtney. He attended Clongowes Wood College and Clonfert Seminary. He initially considered following his father into medicine, but opted instead to study economics and law at University College Dublin.

He left UCD to enrol in the Irish College in Rome. He was ordained a priest in the Diocese of Clonfert on 9 March 1968. Courtney served as a curate until 1973, before becoming a chaplain at the Tynagh mines while also teaching at St. Raphael's College, Loughrea. He later worked as a curate in Woodford. In 1976, he returned to Rome to earn a licentiate in canon law and a doctorate in moral theology and to prepare for a diplomatic career at the Pontifical Ecclesiastical Academy. In 1987, he was awarded an MA in legal philosophy at NUI, Galway.

In addition to English and Irish, Latin and Greek, he picked up Italian, Spanish, French, German, Serbo‑Croatian, Hindi, and Kirundi, Burundi’s national language.

He entered the diplomatic service of the Holy See on 25 March 1980 and worked in nunciatures in South Africa, Senegal, India, Yugoslavia, Cuba, and Egypt. During his posting in Egypt, he supported the Vatican delegation at the 1994 UN population conference in Cairo. On 30 December 1995, he was appointed the Special Envoy and Permanent Observer to the Council of Europe in Strasbourg.

On 18 August 2000, Pope John Paul II appointed him Apostolic Nuncio to Burundi and Titular Archbishop of Eanach Dúin. He received episcopal ordination on 12 November 2000, at St Mary of the Rosary Church in Nenagh from Cardinal Francis Arinze, Prefect of the Congregation for Divine Worship and the Discipline of the Sacraments, with Bishops John Kirby and William Walsh as co-consecrators.

Courtney played a crucial role in facilitating a peace agreement in November 2003 between the Burundian government and the main opposition Hutu group. He was expecting a new assignment as nuncio to Cuba, where he had established a warm relationship with Fidel Castro.

== Death and funeral ==
In December 2003, while returning to Bujumbura from a funeral, gunmen fired at his car near Minago, about 30 miles (48 km) south of the capital. He suffered gunshot wounds to the head, shoulder, and leg, and died from hemorrhaging during surgery at the Prince Louis Rwagasore Hospital in Bujumbura. Archbishop Simon Ntamwana blamed the militant Hutu National Liberation Forces (FNL), however the FNL, which had supported the November agreement, denied any responsibility and said Ntamwana should leave the country.

1,500 people attended a funeral Mass for Courtney in Burundi on 31 December. On 3 January 2004, Cardinals Arinze and Connell, Archbishop Seán Brady, Archbishop Giuseppe Lazzarotto, the Nuncio to Ireland, led a concelebrated funeral Mass in Nenagh. Minister for Defence, Michael Smith, represented the Government of Ireland at the Mass and burial.

Courtney was buried in Dromineer, on the shores of Lough Derg, County Tipperary, near his native Nenagh.

Catholic Church titles
Preceded by Emil Paul Tscherrig	Apostolic Nuncio to Burundi; 18 August 2000–29 December 2003	Succeeded by Paul Gallagher
Preceded by John Jerome Cunneen	Titular Bishop of Eanach Dhúin; 18 August 2000–29 December 2003	Succeeded by Octavio Cisneros
