= Giuseppe Laigueglia =

Italian prelate

Giuseppe Laigueglia (7 September 1922 – 6 June 2001) was an Italian prelate of the Catholic Church who worked in the diplomatic service of the Holy See in 1950 and the Roman Curia.

== Biography ==
Giuseppe Laigueglia was born on 7 September 1922 in Badalucco, Italy. He was ordained a priest of the Diocese of Ventimiglia on 16 June 1946.

To prepare for a diplomatic career he entered the Pontifical Ecclesiastical Academy in 1954.

On 3 August 1973, Pope Paul VI named him titular archbishop of Aeliae and Apostolic Nuncio to Bolivia. He received his episcopal consecration on 22 September 1973 from Cardinal Antonio Samorè.

On 20 January 1979, Pope Paul named him Apostolic Pro-Nuncio to Cuba.

On 31 July 1980 he was named to a position in the Roman Curia, which he held until he resigned on 30 June 1991 at the age of 68.

He died on 6 June 2001.
