= Hubertus van Megen =

Dutch Catholic prelate (born 1961)

His Excellency, The Most Reverend Hubertus van Megen
- Apostolic Nuncio to Germany
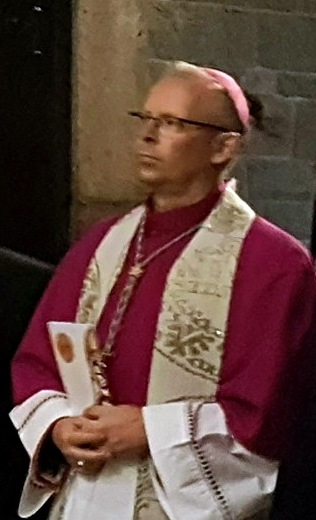
- Hubertus van Megen in 2018
- Appointed: 9 April 2026
- Predecessor: Nikola Eterović
- Other post: Titular Archbishop of Novaliciana
- Previous posts: Apostolic Nuncio to Kenya & Permanent Observer of the Holy See to UNEP and UN-HABITAT (2019‍–‍2026); Apostolic Nuncio to South Sudan (2019-2024); Apostolic Nuncio to Sudan and Eritrea (2014‍–‍2019)

Orders
- Ordination: 13 June 1987
- Consecration: 17 May 2014 by Pietro Parolin, Frans Wiertz, and Silvano Maria Tomasi

Personal details
- Born: October 4, 1961 (age 64) Eygelshoven, Netherlands
- Motto: In Lumine Tuo (Latin for 'In Your Light')

Styles of Hubertus van Megen
- Reference style: His Excellency; The Most Reverend
- Spoken style: Your Excellency
- Religious style: Archbishop

Hubertus Matheus Maria van Megen (born 4 October 1961) is a Dutch prelate of the Catholic Church who works in the diplomatic service of the Holy See.

== Biography ==
Hubertus van Megen was born on 4 October 1961 in Eygelshoven, the Netherlands. He was ordained a priest for the Diocese of Roermond on 13 June 1987.

== Diplomatic career ==
He joined the diplomatic service of the Holy See and was assigned to Somalia and Brazil. As a Nunciature Council, he was at the Mission of the Holy See to the United Nations in Geneva. In Malawi, he was Chargé d'Affaires beginning in 2010.

On 8 March 2014, Pope Francis appointed him Titular Archbishop of Novaliciana and Apostolic Nuncio to Sudan. He received his episcopal consecration from Secretary of State Cardinal Pietro Parolin on 17 May. In 2014, he received the additional responsibilities as Apostolic Nuncio to Eritrea.

On 16 February 2019, he became the Apostolic Nuncio to Kenya. That same year, he was named Apostolic Nuncio to South Sudan as well. In 2019, he transferred to the United Nations and served as the Permanent Observer at the United Nations Environment Program (UNEP) and the United Nations Human Settlements Programme (UN-Habitat).

On 9 April 2026, Pope Leo XIV appointed him as nuncio to Germany.

== See also ==
- List of heads of the diplomatic missions of the Holy See
