= Leo Boccardi =

Italian nuncio

His Excellency, The Most Reverend Leo Boccardi
- Apostolic Nuncio
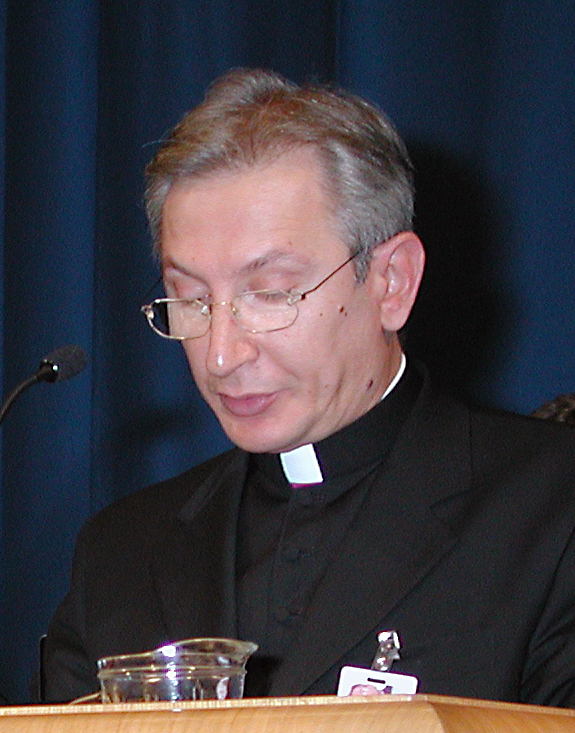
- Church: Roman Catholic
- Appointed: 11 March 2021
- Retired: 1 September 2023
- Other post: Titular Archbishop of Bitettum
- Previous posts: Apostolic Nuncio to Japan (2021 - 2023); Apostolic Nuncio to Iran (2013-2021); Apostolic Nuncio to Sudan and Eritrea (2007-2013)

Personal details
- Born: 15 April 1953 (age 73) San Martino in Pensilis, Italy
- Motto: DOMUS NOSTRA IN ITINERE

Styles of Leo Boccardi
- Reference style: His Excellency; The Most Reverend
- Spoken style: Your Excellency
- Religious style: Archbishop

Leo Boccardi (born 15 April 1953) is a prelate of the Catholic Church who worked in the diplomatic service of the Holy See from 1987 until he retired in 2021, with the rank of archbishop and the title of apostolic nuncio since 2007.

== Biography ==
Boccardi was born in San Martino in Pensilis, Italy. He was ordained to the priesthood on 24 June 1979 by Pope John Paul II.

== Diplomatic career ==
He entered the diplomatic service of the Holy See on 13 June 1987 and then worked in several countries before returning to the offices of the Secretariat of State in Rome.

On 24 March 2001, Pope John Paul II named him to represent the Holy See before several international organizations.

On 16 January 2007, Boccardi was named titular archbishop of Bitettum and Apostolic Nuncio to Sudan. On 30 January he was named Nuncio to Eritrea as well. He received his episcopal consecration on 18 March 2007 from Cardinal Tarcisio Bertone.

On 11 July 2013, Boccardi was appointed Nuncio to Iran.

Following the death of Qassem Soleimani in the 2020 Baghdad International Airport airstrike, Boccardi called for tensions to be lowered through negotiations. He said that all parties need "to believe in dialogue, knowing from what history has always taught, that war and weapons" do not resolve the problems afflicting the world. “We must believe in negotiation".

On 11 March 2021, Pope Francis appointed him Apostolic Nuncio to Japan. He retired on 1 September 2023.

== See also ==
- List of heads of the diplomatic missions of the Holy See
