= Apostolic Nunciature to Sudan =

Diplomatic Mission of the Holy See in Africa

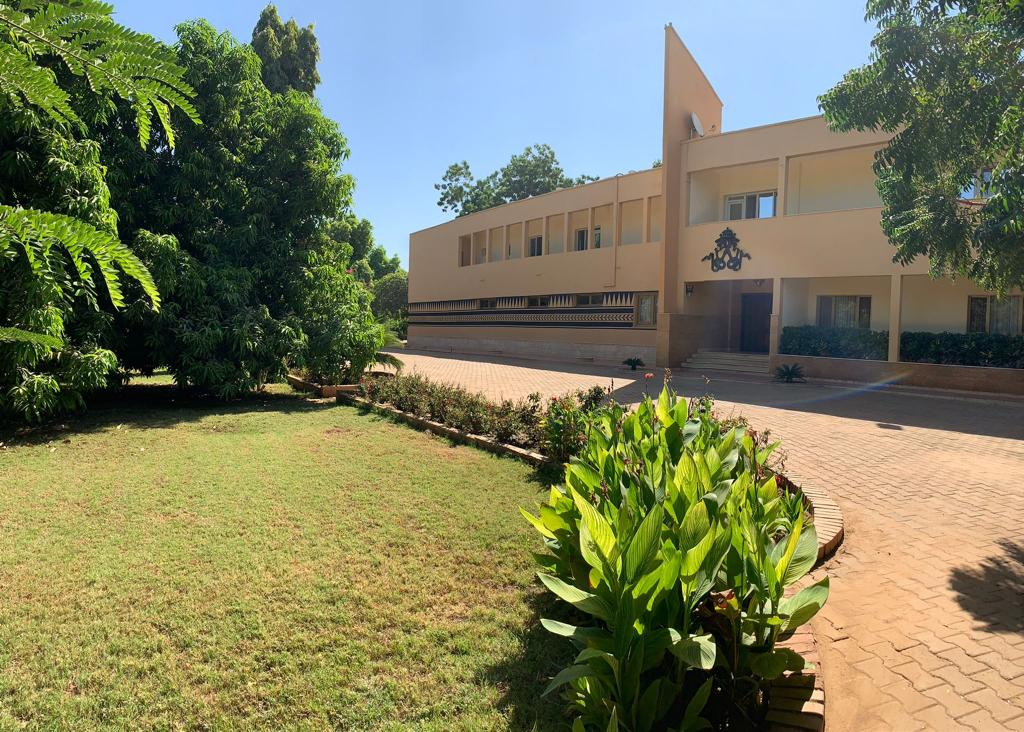
Apostolic Nunciature in Khartoum

The Apostolic Nunciature to Sudan is an ecclesiastical office of the Catholic Church in Sudan. It is a diplomatic post of the Holy See, whose representative is called the Apostolic Nuncio with the rank of an ambassador.

The Apostolic Nunciature to Sudan was established in 1972. It had previously been overseen by a variety of delegations with regional authority, the last of which were the Delegation to Eastern Africa erected in 1960 and the Delegation to the Red Sea Region.

The Apostolic Nuncio to Sudan is usually also the Apostolic Nuncio to Eritrea upon his appointment to said nation.

== List of papal representatives ==
Apostolic Delegates to the Red Sea Region

- Ubaldo Calabresi (3 July 1969 - 5 January 1978)
  - Nunciature to Sudan established 29 April 1972.

Apostolic Pro-Nuncio

- Giovanni Moretti (13 March 1978 - 10 July 1984)
- Luis Robles Díaz (16 February 1985 - 13 March 1990)

Apostolic Nuncios

- Erwin Josef Ender (15 March 1990 - 9 July 1997)
- Marco Dino Brogi (13 December 1997 - 5 February 2002)
- Dominique Mamberti (18 May 2002 - 15 September 2006)
- Leo Boccardi (16 January 2007 - 11 July 2013)
- Hubertus van Megen (8 March 2014 - 16 February 2019)
- Luís Miguel Muñoz Cárdaba (31 March 2020 – 23 January 2024)
