= Apostolic Nunciature to Cuba =

Diplomatic Mission of the Holy See in Cuba

- Location: Havana, Cuba
- Address: Calle 12 No.514, Havana, Cuba
- Coordinates: 23°07′26.1″N 82°24′59.2″W
- Apostolic Nuncio: Archbishop Giampiero Gloder

The Apostolic Nunciature to Cuba the diplomatic mission of the Holy See to Cuba. It is located at the nation's capital, in Havana. The current Apostolic Nuncio is Antoine Camilleri, who was named to the position by Pope Francis on 20 May 2024.

The Apostolic Nunciature to the Republic of Cuba is an ecclesiastical office of the Catholic Church in Cuba, with the rank of an embassy. The nuncio serves both as the ambassador of the Holy See to the President of Cuba, and as delegate and point-of-contact between the Catholic hierarchy in Cuba and the Pope.

== Papal representatives to Cuba since 1898 ==
Apostolic Delegates

- Placide Louis Chapelle (16 September 1898 – 9 August 1905 )
- Giuseppe Aversa (24 May 1906 – 21 October 1909)
- Adolfo Alejandro Nouel y Bobadilla (3 November 1913 – 1915?)
- Tito Trocchi (14 November 1915 – 25 May 1921)
- Pietro Benedetti (22 July 1921 – 1926)

Apostolic Nuncios

- George Joseph Caruana (15 September 1935 – 26 April 1947)
- Antonio Taffi (14 April 1947 – 9 January 1950)
- Giuseppe Burzio (19 December 1950 – 7 January 1955)
- Luigi Centoz (29 November 1954 – 5 July 1962)
- Cesare Zacchi (24 May 1974 – 1 June 1975)
  - Zacchi led the nunciature in Cuba as chargé d'affaires from 5 July 1962

Apostolic Pro-Nuncios

- Mario Tagliaferri (25 June 1975 – 15 December 1978)
- Giuseppe Laigueglia (20 January 1979 – 31 July 1980)
- Giulio Einaudi (5 August 1980 – 23 September 1988)
- Faustino Sainz Muñoz (29 October 1988 – 7 October 1992)

Apostolic Nuncios

- Beniamino Stella (15 December 1992 – 11 February 1999)
- Luis Robles Díaz (6 March 1999 – 4 October 2003)
- Luigi Bonazzi (30 March 2004 – 14 March 2009)
- Giovanni Angelo Becciu (23 July 2009 – 10 May 2011)
- Bruno Musarò (6 August 2011 – 5 February 2015)
- Giorgio Lingua (17 March 2015 – 11 October 2019)
- Giampiero Gloder (11 October 2019 – 23 February 2023)
- Antoine Camilleri (20 May 2024 – present)

== See also ==
- Cuba-Holy See Relations
