= Nicola Rotunno =

Italian prelate

Nicola Rotunno (1 December 1928 – 8 February 1999) was an Italian prelate of the Catholic Church who spent his career in the diplomatic service of the Holy See, including stints as Apostolic Nuncio in Burundi, Rwanda, Sri Lanka, and Syria.

== Biography ==
Nicola Rotunno was born in Stigliano in the Province of Matera on 1 December 1928. He was ordained a priest on 25 July 1951.

To prepare for a diplomatic career he entered the Pontifical Ecclesiastical Academy in 1955. His first assignments took him to Honduras, Nicaragua, Oceania, and Lisbon.

On 7 January 1975, Pope Paul VI named him a titular archbishop and Apostolic Nuncio to Burundi and Rwanda. He received his episcopal consecration from Pope Paul.

On 13 April 1978, Pope Paul appointed him Apostolic Pro-Nuncio to Sri Lanka. The Sri Lankan government was unhappy that Rotunno appeared sympathetic to Sri Lanka's Tamil population. He also met with resistance from Jesuit Aloysius Pieris when he attempted to investigate his relationship with the Buddhist community.

On 30 August 1983, Pope John Paul II named him Apostolic Pro-Nuncio to Syria.

On 8 December 1987, Pope John Paul assigned him to the Secretariat of State; on 27 February 1988, he appointed Rotunno Bishop of Sabina-Poggio Mirteto, allowing him to keep the personal title archbishop. He retired on 30 July 1992.

He died on 4 February 1999.
