= Apostolic Nunciature to Nigeria =

Diplomatic post of the Holy See

The Apostolic Nunciature to Nigeria is the diplomatic mission of the Holy See to Nigeria. The Apostolic Nuncio to Nigeria is an ecclesiastical office of the Catholic Church in Nigeria, with the rank of an ambassador. The nuncio serves both as the ambassador of the Holy See to the Republic of Nigeria and as the point-of-contact between the Catholic hierarchy in Nigeria and the pope.

In May 1960, the Holy See established the Delegation to West Central Africa to represent its interests in that region. It was given responsibility for Nigeria, Cameroon, Gabon, Oubangui-Chari (Central African Republic), and Chad. After further reorganizations of its offices for the emerging independent nations of Africa, the Holy See created the Delegation to Nigeria and Ghana–a single office–in May 1973. Separate nunciatures for Ghana and Nigeria were erected on 29 April 1976.

== List of papal representatives to Nigeria ==
Apostolic Delegates to Central Western Africa

- Sergio Pignedoli (23 September 1960 – 1 June 1964)
- Luigi Bellotti (18 July 1964 – 27 November 1969)
- Amelio Poggi (27 November 1969 – 26 September 1973)

Apostolic Delegates to Nigeria and Ghana

- Girolamo Prigione (2 October 1973 – 7 February 1978)
  - Nunciature to Nigeria established 29 April 1976
  - Prigione named Pro-Nuncio to Nigeria 29 April 1976

Apostolic Pro-Nuncios to Nigeria

- Carlo Curis (13 March 1978 – 4 February 1984)
- Paul Fouad Naïm Tabet (8 September 1984 – 14 December 1991)
- Carlo Maria Viganò (3 April 1992 – 4 April 1998)

Apostolic Nuncios

- Osvaldo Padilla (22 August 1998 – 31 July 2003)
- Renzo Fratini (27 January 2004 – 20 August 2009)
- Augustine Kasujja (2 February 2010 – 12 October 2016)
- Antonio Guido Filipazzi (26 April 2017 – 8 August 2023)
- Michael Francis Crotty (16 July 2024 - )
