= Bernard Jacqueline =

French prelate

Bernard Jacqueline (18 March 1918 – 26 February 2007) was a French prelate of the Catholic Church who worked in the Roman Curia and served as Nuncio to Burundi and Morocco.

== Biography ==
Bernard Henri René Jacqueline was born on 18 March 1918 in Saint-Lô, Normandy, France. He studied at the institute Saint-Lô d'Agneaux and the seminary Saint-Sulpice in Paris. He was ordained a priest for the Diocese of Coutances on 12 March 1944 in Notre-Dame cathedral in Paris.

He fulfilled parish assignments in Mont-Saint-Michel (1944), Mortain (1945), and Tourlaville (1946). He then taught philosophy at the Saint-Paul Institute in Cherbourg while serving the parish of Gonneville from 1947 to 1951. He obtained his doctorate in canon law at the Catholic Institute of Paris.

He moved to Rome and served as chaplain of the Lycée Chateaubriand, chaplain of San Luigi dei Francesi parish, and rector of the Saint-Pierre-Fourier chapel from 1951 to 1961. He then worked in the Roman Curia at the Congregation for the Propagation of the Faith (CPF) from 1961 to 1973 and then became Under-Secretary of the Secretariat for Non-Christians. In 1964, during the Second Vatican Council, while responsible for the Far East at the CPF, he gave Yves Congar a very negative assessment of the Vatican's diplomats in the region. He obtained his doctorate in 1971 from the Sorbonne with a thesis on Episcopacy and Papacy after Saint Bernard of Clairvaux.

Pope John Paul II appointed him Apostolic Pro-Nuncio to Burundi and titular archbishop of Abbir Majus on 24 April 1982. He received his episcopal consecration from Cardinal Agostino Casaroli on Saturday June 19 in St. Peter's Basilica.

Pope John Paul named him Apostolic Pro-Nuncio to Morocco on 20 March 1986.

The Académie Française twice awarded him prizes: the Prix Véga et Lods de Wegmann in 1976 for Épiscopat et papauté chez Saint-Bernard de Clairvaux and the Cardinal Grente Prize in 1987 for Publication intégrale des œuvres spirituelles du Père Charles de Foucauld.

In 1989 he was elected a Corresponding Member of the Academy of Moral and Political Sciences.

He retired in 1993 and returned to live in Saint-Lô. He devoted himself to the history of Saint-Lô and the Manche department; he led the Society of Archeology and History of the Manche, a society in which he had maintained a membership since 1937.

He died in Saint-Lô on 26 February 2007.
