= Pietro Benedetti =

Italian prelate

Pietro Benedetti, MSC (19 May 1867 – 7 September 1930) was an Italian prelate of the Catholic Church who was a leader of the Missionaries of the Sacred Heart and also worked in the diplomatic service of the Holy See in Mexico, Cuba, and Puerto Rico for several years.

== Biography ==
Pietro Benedetti was born on 19 May 1867 in Falvaterra, Italy. He joined the Missionaries of the Sacred Heart in 1883 and was ordained a priest on 21 December 1889. He taught for a decade in Barcelona, developing a personal relationship with the Catalan poet Jacint Verdaguer. He translated Verdaguer's poems and published them in his parish bulletin during the First World War. His Italian translation of a collection of Verdaguer's poems was published in 1921.

He moved to Rome in 1901. On 31 October 1908, he was named vice director and in 1909 director of the Acta Apostolicae Sedis. Beginning in 1910 he was a member of a commission on revising catechism instruction in response to Pope Pius X's decree Quam singulari admitting children to the Eucharist.

He was provincial (procurator) of his order when, on 21 December 1914, Pope Benedict XV named him Bishop of Ozieri in Sardinia. He was not consecrated and someone else was named to this position in April 1915.

On 10 March 1921, Pope Benedict XV appointed him titular archbishop of Tyrus and Apostolic Delegate to Mexico. (Note: His appointment to Mexico was not recorded in the Acta Apostolicae Sedis.) He received his episcopal consecration on 10 April 1921 from Cardinal Basilio Pompilj.

In Mexico the Church was contending with the government’s anti-clerical campaign, which posed a challenge for the Holy See's representative. On 22 July 1921, Pope Benedict reassigned him, naming him Apostolic Delegate to Cuba and Puerto Rico.

He resigned as delegate in 1925 or 1926, apparently because of his health.

Benedetti died on 7 September 1930 in Siena.
