= Antonio Guido Filipazzi =

Italian prelate of the Catholic Church

His Excellency, The Most Reverend Antonio Guido Filipazzi
- Apostolic Nuncio of Poland
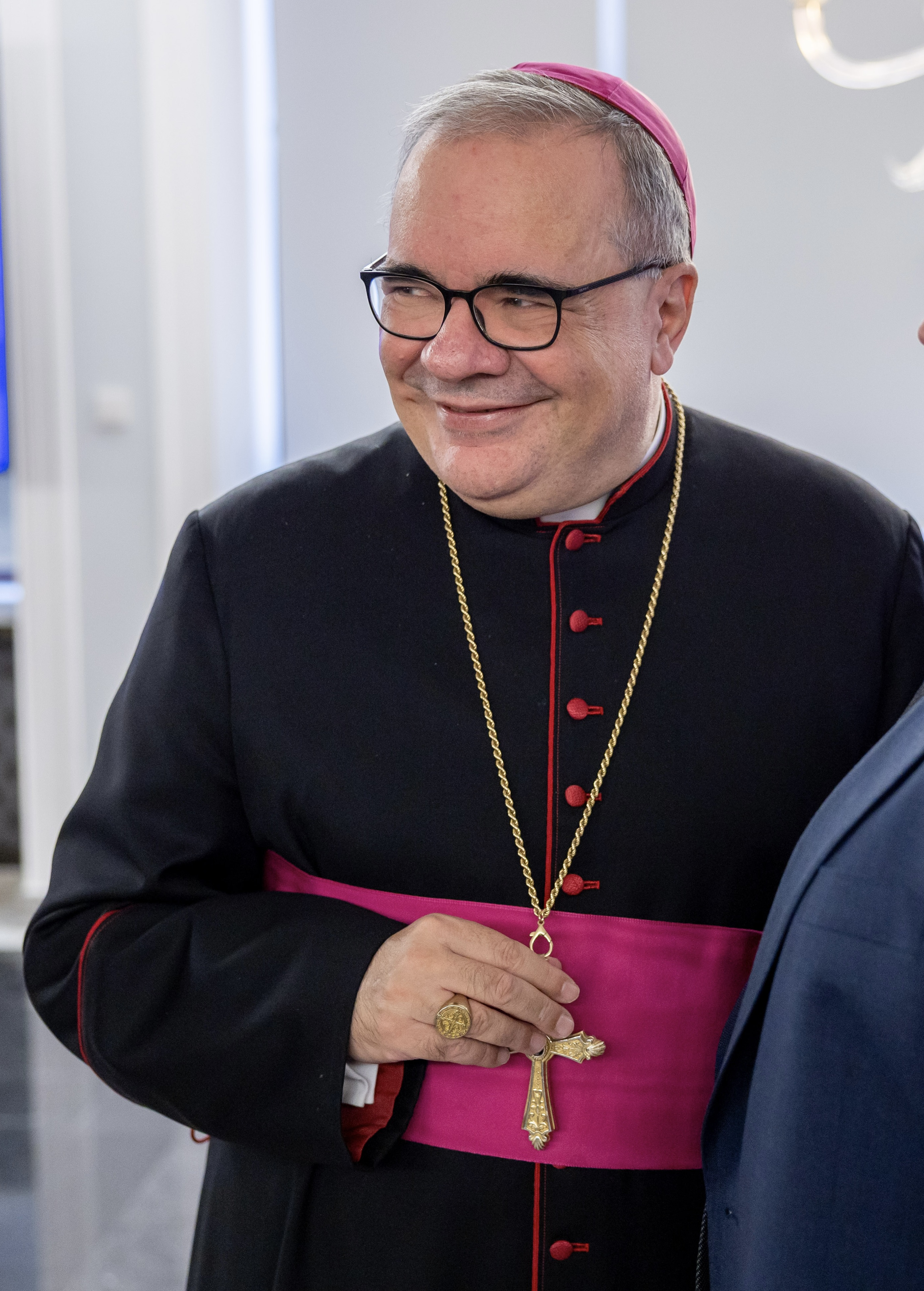
- Antonio Filipazzi in 2026
- Appointed: 8 August 2023
- Predecessor: Salvatore Pennacchio
- Other post: Titular Archbishop of Sutri
- Previous posts: Apostolic Nuncio to Nigeria and Permanent Observer of ECOWAS (2017-2023); Apostolic Nuncio to Indonesia (2011-2017)

Orders
- Ordination: 10 October 1987 by Giuseppe Siri
- Consecration: 5 February 2011 by Pope Benedict XVI, Angelo Sodano, and Tarcisio Bertone

Personal details
- Born: 8 October 1963 (age 63) Melzo, Milan, Italy
- Education: Facoltà teologica dell'Italia settentrionale
- Motto: Nisi Dominus ædificaverit

Styles of Antonio Guido Filipazzi
- Reference style: His Excellency; The Most Reverend
- Spoken style: Your Excellency
- Religious style: Archbishop

Antonio Guido Filipazzi (born 8 October 1963) is an Italian prelate of the Catholic Church who has worked in the diplomatic service of the Holy See since 1992.

== Biography ==
He was born in Melzo, in the Province of Milan, on 8 October 1963 and grew up in Gessate. After completing his classical studies, he studied at the Genoa Section of Theological Faculty of Northern Italy, obtaining a bachelor's degree in theology in 1987. On 10 October 1987 he was ordained a priest of the Diocese of Genoa by Cardinal Giuseppe Siri. On 1 September 1989, he was incardinated into the Diocese of Ventimiglia-San Remo.

He was parochial vicar of the Cathedral of Santa Maria Assunta in Ventimiglia and taught canon law at the Episcopal Seminary "Pio XI" of Bordighera from 1989 to 1990. He then obtained his doctorate in canon law at the Pontifical University of the Holy Cross on 12 May 1992 and a diploma from the Pontifical Ecclesiastical Academy.

== Diplomatic career ==
He entered the diplomatic service of the Holy See on 1 July 1992. His early assignments were in the nunciatures in Sri Lanka (1992 to 1995), Austria (1995 to 1998), and Germany (1998 to 2003), and then in Rome in the Section for Relations with States of the Secretariat of State from 2003 to 2011.

He also taught canon law in the Seminary Redemptoris Mater of Berlin from 2002 to 2003 and was a member of the delegation of the Holy See to the Italian-Vatican Joint Commission, established to deepen the concordat profiles related to the free fulfilment of the ministry of bishops and the related criminal procedural questions, from 2004 to 2011.

== Diplomatic career ==
On 8 January 2011, Pope Benedict XVI appointed him titular archbishop of Sutri and apostolic nuncio. He received his episcopal consecration on 5 February from Pope Benedict. At the time, he was the youngest Italian bishop and the youngest nuncio.

On 23 March 2011, he was appointed apostolic nuncio to Indonesia.

On 26 April 2017, Pope Francis appointed him apostolic nuncio in Nigeria. On 24 October 2017, he was also appointed permanent observer at the Economic Community of West African States (ECOWAS).

On 8 August 2023, Pope Francis appointed him apostolic nuncio to Poland.

== See also ==
- List of heads of the diplomatic missions of the Holy See
