= Paul Gallagher (bishop) =

British Catholic prelate (born 1954)

His Excellency The Most Reverend Sir Paul Gallagher KCMG GCIH
- Secretary for Relations with States
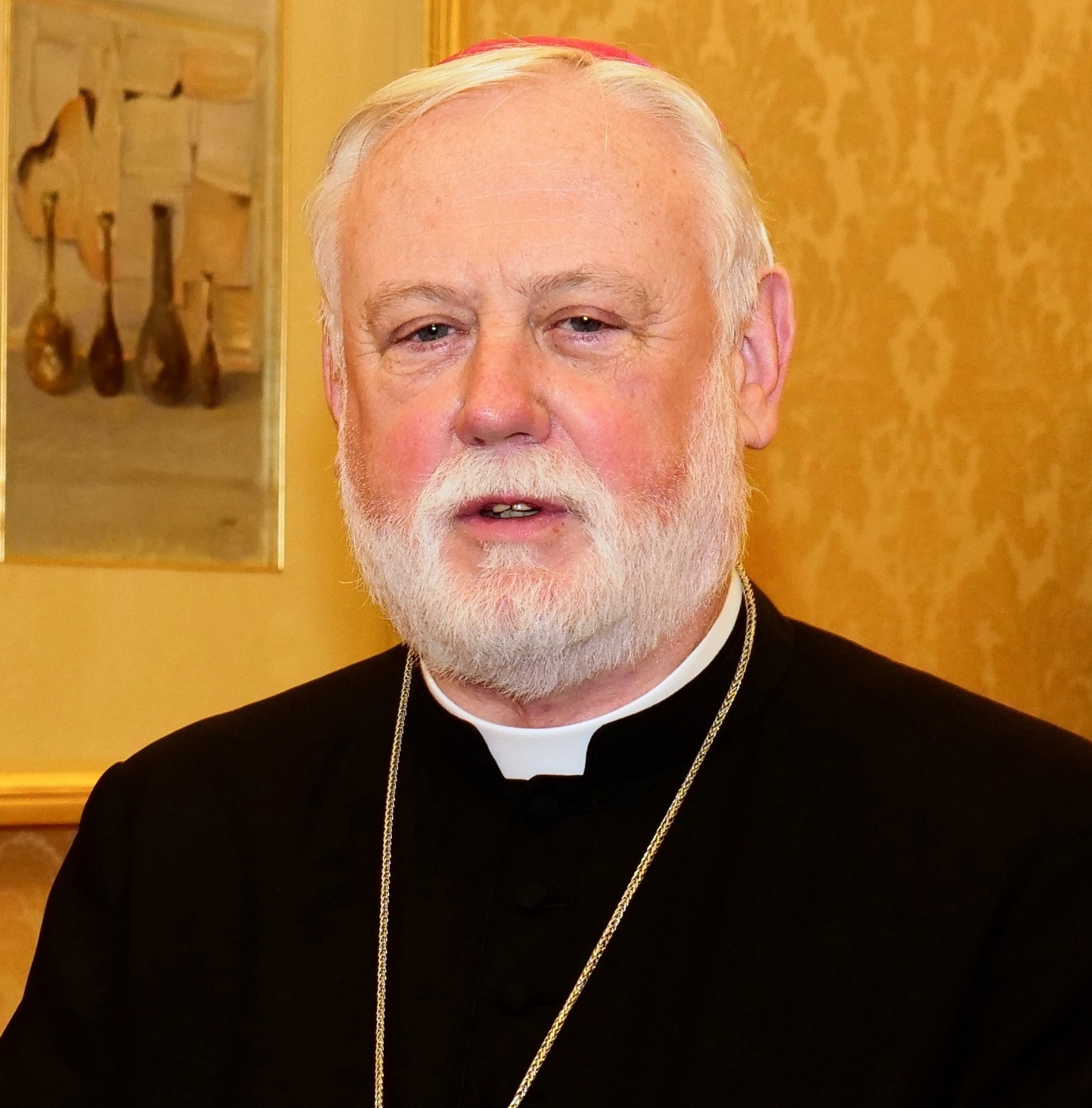
- Gallagher in 2018
- Appointed: 8 November 2014
- Predecessor: Dominique Mamberti
- Other post: Titular Archbishop of Hodelm (2004–present)
- Previous posts: Apostolic Nuncio to Australia (2012–2014); Apostolic Nuncio to Guatemala (2009–2012); Apostolic Nuncio to Burundi (2004–2009)

Orders
- Ordination: 31 July 1977 by Derek Worlock
- Consecration: 13 March 2004 by Angelo Sodano

Personal details
- Born: Paul Richard Gallagher; 23 January 1954 (age 72) Liverpool, United Kingdom
- Denomination: Roman Catholicism
- Education: Pontifical Gregorian University (JCD), Pontifical Ecclesiastical Academy
- Motto: Humiliter cum Deo ("Humbly with God")
- Coat of arms

Styles of Paul Gallagher
- Reference style: The Most Reverend
- Spoken style: Your Grace
- Religious style: Archbishop

Sir Paul Richard Gallagher (born 23 January 1954) is a British prelate of the Catholic Church who has been Secretary for Relations with States within the Holy See's Secretariat of State since November 2014. He has worked in the diplomatic service of the Holy See since 1984 and has held the rank of archbishop and apostolic nuncio since 2004, serving as nuncio (papal ambassador) in Burundi, Guatemala, and Australia.

== Life and career ==
=== Early life ===
Gallagher was born in Liverpool, England, and was educated at St Francis Xavier’s College in Woolton. He was ordained by Archbishop Derek Worlock on 31 July 1977 for the Archdiocese of Liverpool. He served in Fazakerley before taking courses at the Pontifical Ecclesiastical Academy. He later earned a doctorate in canon law from the Pontifical Gregorian University, becoming a member of the Holy See's diplomatic service on 1 May 1984.

=== Episcopate ===
He held posts in Tanzania, Uruguay, the Philippines, and the Vatican Secretariat of State. He was appointed Counselor, First Class, on 1 May 1997, when working at the nunciature in Burundi. He worked in its Second Section, from 1995 to 2000 at the same time as the present Cardinal Secretary of State, Pietro Parolin.

On 18 August 2000, Pope John Paul II named him Special Envoy as Permanent Observer to the Council of Europe in Strasbourg.

John Paul appointed him Apostolic Nuncio to Burundi on 22 January 2004. His residence in that country was bombed in 2008.

He was appointed nuncio to Guatemala on 19 February 2009.

Ruth Gledhill, the then religious affairs correspondent of The Times, mentioned him as a possible candidate for the position of Archbishop of Westminster in succession to Cardinal Cormac Murphy-O'Connor. However, the successor, announced on 3 April 2009, was Archbishop Vincent Nichols.

On 11 December 2012, he was appointed papal nuncio to Australia, a post he held until being made Secretary for Relations with States on 8 November 2014 by Pope Francis.

In 2015, a comprehensive agreement was signed by the Holy See and Palestine which may serve the twofold goal of stimulating peace in the Middle East and providing a model for similar treaties. The text of the treaty was agreed upon on 13 May, and the document was signed on 26 June in the Apostolic Palace by Gallagher and Riad al-Malki, the minister of foreign affairs of Palestine. Gallagher voiced hope "that the present agreement may in some way be a stimulus to bringing a definitive end to the long-standing Israeli-Palestinian conflict, which continues to cause suffering for both parties. I also hope that the much desired two-state solution may become a reality as soon as possible."

In July 2015, Gallagher said in an interview that the Joint Comprehensive Plan of Action (the 2015 Iran nuclear deal) was viewed "in a positive light" by the Holy See because it believed that controversies and difficulties must always be resolved through dialogue and negotiation.

In a February 2016 interview he said "Let's not be kidding ourselves about what the stakes are here: If we are going to bring peace, if we are going to reconcile nations, if we are going to secure countries and communities, particularly minorities, particularly people who are persecuted, we are going to have to make an unprecedented effort," Gallagher speaking specifically of the crisis in Syria and Iraq, where so-called Islamic State militants have captured large swaths of territory and driven out tens of thousands of Christians and members of other minority groups, Gallagher said he is hopeful for a resolution of the conflict".

In 2020, he met the People's Republic of China's foreign minister, Wang Yi.

In March 2021, Gallagher said that Pope Francis' visit to Iraq was "a geopolitical problem, because Christians have always been there, they have always had a role amidst the other communities, the larger, more powerful communities".

When speaking in July 2022 of his visit to Ukraine in May that year, he was asked if his comment describing Russia as the aggressor was made in the name of the pope. Gallagher replied, "I was speaking in the name of the Holy See, and the Holy Father hasn't corrected me so far on what I’ve said on his behalf." He added "I don't think we've formally got World War III because to have a war you have to declare war. But certainly we are getting to a very dangerous situation worldwide, and, as we know, it wouldn't take much to make things even worse ... we've got to try and make our multinational, multilateral institutions work better".

Gallagher was the representative of Pope Francis at the state funeral of Queen Elizabeth II in London in September 2022.

In the context of the Gaza war, in October 2023 he spoke on the phone to Iran's foreign minister, Hossein Amir-Abdollahian, at the request of the latter.

Gallagher visited Vietnam from 9–14 April 2024 where he met the foreign minister, Bùi Thanh Sơn, and the prime minister, Phạm Minh Chính.

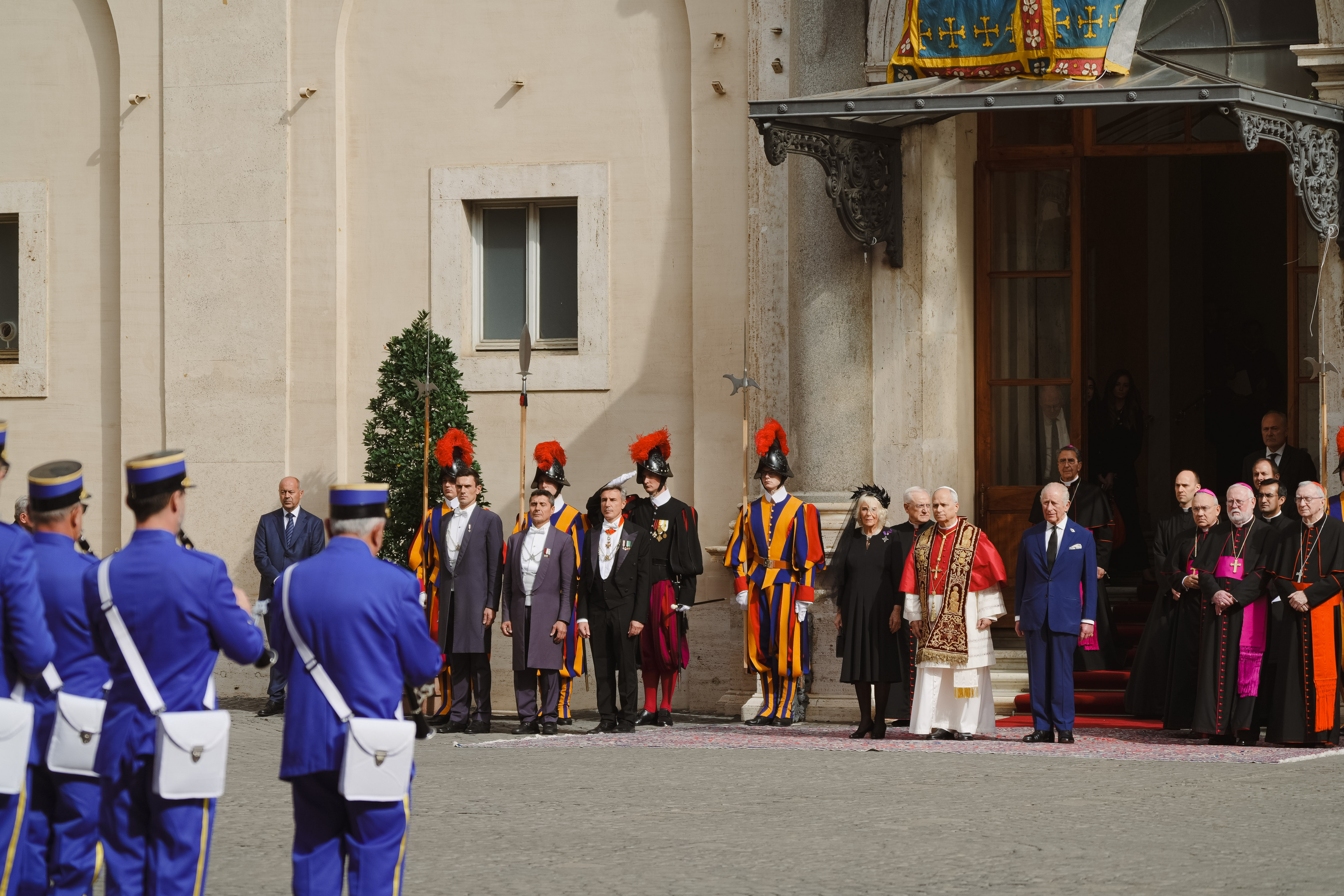
Archbishop Gallagher at the reception of the British royal couple at the Vatican on 23 October 2025

Gallagher visited the Philippines from 1 to 6 July 2024 where he led the Pope's Day celebration for the Diplomatic Corps on the Solemnity of Sts Peter and Paul. He also met with Philippines president Ferdinand R. Marcos Jr., accompanied by the apostolic nuncio to the Philippines, Archbishop Charles John Brown. He also met with the Catholic Bishops' Conference of the Philippines in Malaybalay in Bukidnon.

Gallagher speaks native English, near-native Italian and fluent French and Spanish.

== Honours ==
- Grand Cross of the Order of Prince Henry (GCIH) (23 April 2016)
- Knight Commander of the Order of St Michael and St George (KCMG) (22 October 2025)
- Commander of the Order of Legion of Honour
- Grand Officer of the Order of the Star of Romania
- Grand Cross of the Order of Manuel Amador Guerrero

== See also ==
- List of current foreign ministers

Catholic Church titles
Preceded by Thomas Ludger Dupré	— TITULAR — Archbishop of Hodelm; 2004–present	Incumbent
Diplomatic posts
Preceded by Michael Courtney	Apostolic Nuncio to Burundi; 2004–2009	Succeeded by Franco Coppola
Preceded by Bruno Musarò	Apostolic Nuncio to Guatemala; 2009–2012	Succeeded by Nicolas Thévenin
Preceded by Giuseppe Lazzarotto	Apostolic Nuncio to Australia; 2012–2014	Succeeded by Adolfo Tito Yllana
Political offices
Preceded by Dominique Mamberti	Secretary for Relations with States; 2014–present	Incumbent
