= Apostolic Nunciature to Kenya =

Diplomatic post of the Holy See

The Apostolic Nunciature to Kenya is an ecclesiastical office of the Catholic Church in Kenya. It is a diplomatic post of the Holy See, whose representative is called the Apostolic Nuncio with the rank of an ambassador. Diplomatic relations between the Holy See and Kenya were established in November 1965, following the proclamation of the Republic of Kenya on 12 December 1964.

The Apostolic Nuncio to Kenya is usually also the Permanent Observer of the Holy See to UNEP and UN-HABITAT upon his appointment.

== List of papal representatives ==
- Guido del Mestri (27 October 1965 – 9 September 1967)
- Pierluigi Sartorelli (9 November 1967 – 16 January 1976)
- Agostino Cacciavillan (17 January 1976 – 9 May 1981)
- Giuseppe Ferraioli (21 July 1981 – 1982)
- Clemente Faccani (27 June 1983 – 31 December 1995)
- Giovanni Tonucci (9 March 1996 – 16 October 2004)
- Alain Paul Lebeaupin (14 January 2005 – 23 June 2012)
- Charles Daniel Balvo (17 January 2013 – 21 September 2018)
- Hubertus van Megen (16 February 2019 – 9 April 2026)

== See also ==
- Foreign relations of the Holy See
- List of heads of the diplomatic missions of the Holy See
