= Christophe Pierre =

French cardinal and diplomat (born 1946)

His Eminence Christophe Pierre
- Cardinal; Apostolic Nuncio Emeritus to the United States
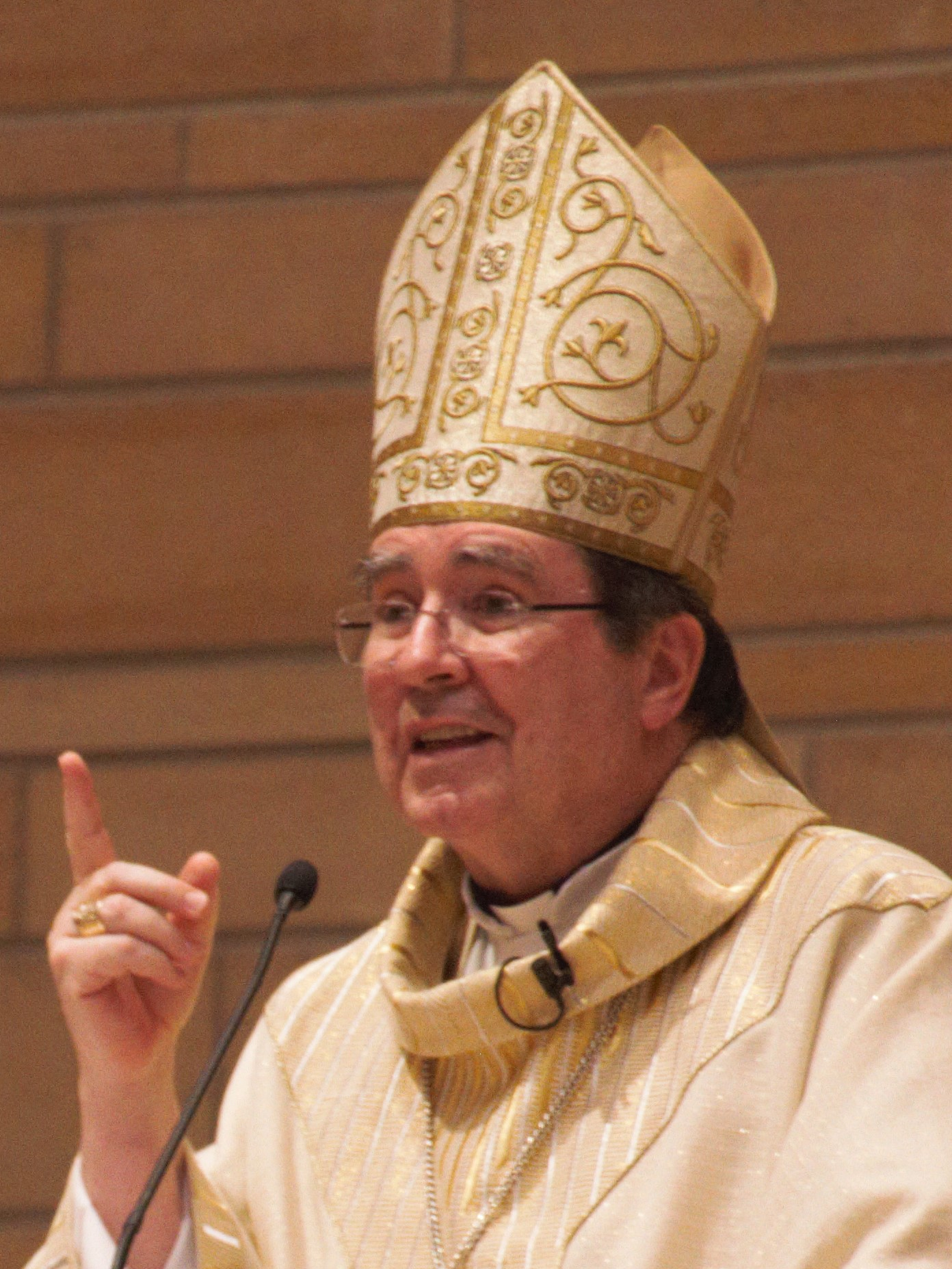
- Pierre in 2018
- Appointed: 12 April 2016
- Retired: 7 March 2026
- Predecessor: Carlo Maria Viganò
- Successor: Gabriele Giordano Caccia
- Other post: Cardinal-Deacon of San Benedetto fuori Porta San Paolo (2023–present)
- Previous post: Apostolic Nuncio to Mexico (2007–2016); Apostolic Nuncio to Uganda (1999–2007); Apostolic Nuncio to Haiti (1995–1999); Titular Archbishop of Gunela (1995–2023)

Orders
- Ordination: 5 April 1970 by Paul Gouyon
- Consecration: 24 September 1995 by Angelo Sodano
- Created cardinal: 30 September 2023 by Pope Francis
- Rank: Cardinal Deacon

Personal details
- Born: Christophe Louis Yves Georges Pierre; 30 January 1946 (age 80) Rennes, France
- Motto: Si scires donum Dei (Latin for 'If you knew the gift of God')
- Styles
- Reference style: His Eminence; The Most Reverend Eminence
- Spoken style: Your Eminence
- Religious style: Cardinal
- Informal style: Cardinal

Ordination history
History
Episcopal consecration
- Consecrated by: Angelo Sodano
- Date: September 24, 1995
Episcopal succession
Bishops consecrated by Christophe Pierre as principal consecrator
- Joseph Serge Miot: October 12, 1997
- Enrique Sanchez Martinez: October 10, 2008
- Jorge Carlos Patrón Wong: December 15, 2009
- Raúl Gómez González: January 25, 2010
- José Armando Álvarez Cano: January 30, 2012
- Jaime Calderón Calderón: October 5, 2012
- Rafael Valdéz Torres: July 31, 2013
- Gerardo Díaz Vázquez: October 22, 2014
- Hilario González García: January 22, 2015
- Cristóbal Ascencio García: February 12, 2015
- Francisco Eduardo Cervantes Merino: April 23, 2015
- Fidencio López Plaza: May 20, 2015
- José Alberto González Juárez: July 22, 2015
- Jose Hirais Acosta Beltran: March 14, 2016
- José Fortunato Álvarez Valdéz: March 16, 2016

Christophe Louis Yves Georges Pierre (French pronunciation: [kʁistɔf pjɛʁ], born 30 January 1946) is a French Catholic prelate and diplomat who served as Apostolic Nuncio to the United States from 2016 to 2026. He previously served as apostolic nuncio to Mexico, Uganda, and Haiti. He was made a cardinal in 2023.

== Biography ==
=== Early life ===
Christophe Louis Yves Georges Pierre was born in Rennes, France, on 30 January 1946 to a family with roots for many generations in Brittany. He was the eldest of six children. His father, who had not long before escaped from a prisoner-of-war camp in Austria, was a lawyer who moved his family when Christophe was three to Madagascar where he worked for about ten years and then to Marrakesh. Pierre spent much of his childhood in Africa, mostly in Madagascar but also in Malawi and Zimbabwe. He attended primary school at Antsirabe in Madagascar and then pursued his secondary studies at the College of Saint-Malo and the Lycée Victor-Hugo de Marrakech. He entered the Catholic seminary of Saint-Yves in Rennes in 1963, interrupting his studies to complete his required military service in France in 1965–66.

=== Priesthood ===
Pierre was ordained a priest of the Archdiocese of Rennes at the Cathedral of Saint-Malo in Saint-Malo, France, on 5 April 1970. He served as vicar of the parish of Saint-Pierre-Saint-Paul in Colombes, a Paris suburb, in the Diocese of Nanterre from 1970 to 1973. Pierre obtained his Master of Theology degree at the Institut Catholique de Paris and his Doctor of Canon Law degree from the Pontifical Lateran University in Rome (1973-1977).

== Diplomatic service ==
In 1973, he entered the Pontifical Ecclesiastical Academy, which trains papal diplomats. He entered the Vatican diplomatic service on 5 March 1977, serving first in Wellington, New Zealand. Pierre then held posts in Mozambique, Zimbabwe, Cuba, Brazil, and as the Permanent Observer of the Holy See to the United Nations in Geneva.

=== Haiti ===
On 12 July 1995, Pope John Paul II named Pierre as apostolic nuncio to Haiti and titular archbishop of Gunela. He received his episcopal consecration on 24 September in the Cathedral of Saint-Malo from Cardinal Secretary of State Angelo Sodano. He chose as his episcopal motto Si Scires Donum Dei ("If you knew the gift of God") John 4:10. In Haiti, which had experienced years of church-state conflict, Pierre was described as non-political. He arranged for Haitian President Jean-Bertrand Aristide to be released from his vows as a Catholic priest.

=== Uganda ===
On 10 May 1999, Pierre was transferred as apostolic nuncio to Kampala, Uganda In 2000, he campaigned against the Ugandan government's promotion of condom use to prevent the spread of HIV/AIDS. Vice President Speciosa Kazibwe, herself a doctor, promoted condom use during a national tour and complained that religious leaders were hampering the government's public health efforts. Pierre replied that condoms promoted "outright promiscuity" that would increase the incidence of HIV/AIDS. Years later, Pierre linked Uganda's success in fighting HIV/AIDS to the church's abstinence education strategy. During his time in Uganda, Pierre worked with Italian missionary Father John Scalabrini in supporting many disadvantaged Ugandans with school and health care.

Following the assassination of the papal nuncio to Burundi, Archbishop Michael Courtney on 29 December 2003, he celebrated his funeral mass in the Regina Mundi Cathedral in Bujumbura the next day and oversaw the work of the nunciature there until the appointment of a new nuncio, Archbishop Paul Gallagher on 22 January 2004.

=== Mexico ===
On 22 March 2007, Pope Benedict XVI named Pierre as apostolic nuncio to Mexico. He arrived just after the bishops of Latin America had produced their Aparecida statement and he later recalled being impressed by their achievement: "I read it, and I said, 'My God, this is new! The bishops finally have developed a pastoral plan which is the result of their synodal approach.' The fruit of Aparecida is a new pastoral approach. I saw it working in Mexico. It changes the church."

After Pope Francis sharply criticized the Mexican bishops during his visit to Mexico in February 2016, an editorial in the newspaper of the Archdiocese of Mexico City objected to the Pope's criticism and asked: "Does the Pope have some reason for scolding Mexican bishops? ... [Do] the improvised words of the Holy Father respond to bad advice from someone close to him? Who gave the Pope bad advice?" Pierre was generally recognized as the target of the editorial and the source of the "bad advice".

Jorge E. Traslosheros wrote in Crux that, while in Mexico, Pierre managed "to weave with an artist's skills unity among Catholics, thereby overcoming the political divisions and culture wars that have caused so much damage". Traslosheros credited Pierre with bridging Mexico's secular establishment and the Catholic populace.

=== United States ===
Pope Francis named Pierre apostolic nuncio to the United States on 12 April 2016, succeeding Archbishop Carlo Maria Viganò. He was the first Frenchman and the second Francophone to hold the position. He later described his surprise that the American bishops were unaware of the Latin American bishops' synodal activity, their work at Aparecida, or that Pope Francis' Evangelii Gaudium was based on it.

Advocating for immigrants, he joined demonstrations and meetings with Texas-Mexico border bishops in October 2016 in Nogales, Arizona, and in February 2016 in San Juan, Puerto Rico. Pierre celebrated Mass at the National Scout Jamboree in July 2017 and discussed his five years in Scouting in a sermon that tied Scouting's ideals to Christian service. The National Catholic Reporter described him as "a staunch defender of Francis in the U.S.".

On 9 July 2023, Pope Francis announced his intention to make Pierre a cardinal at a consistory scheduled for 30 September. At that consistory he was made Cardinal-Deacon of San Benedetto fuori Porta San Paolo. Taking possession of his titular church in April 2024, he said that as nuncio he never felt rootless but had learned "to find roots everywhere". He also said that rather than proclaiming absolutes the Church needs to understand that "to be pro-life is also to help the people concretely, not just to defend an idea, not to embrace a political party which is pro-life, but also to be on the ground, an actor to defend the values, because we are not just in favor of a few values. We are disciples of Jesus and the disciples are a witness and are committed to helping." On 4 October 2023, he was named a member of the Administration of the Patrimony of the Apostolic See.

In 2024, he was awarded an honorary degree from the University of Notre Dame.

He participated as a cardinal elector in the 2025 papal conclave that elected Pope Leo XIV.

==== 2026 meeting with Elbridge Colby ====
In April 2026, The Free Press reported that on 22 January 2026, Under Secretary of War for Policy Elbridge Colby summoned Pierre to an "unprecedented" closed door "lecture" at the Pentagon. According to The Free Press, Colby, along with several colleagues, used the meeting to criticize Pope Leo XIV's annual "state of the world" speech given in January 2026, and told Pierre that the United States "has the military power to do whatever it wants—and that the Church had better take its side." Another official invoked the Avignon Papacy, a period during the 1300s where the French Monarchy used its military power to control the papacy.

The report also noted that Pope Leo XIV may not visit the United States through the duration of Donald Trump's second presidency.

On 8 April 2026, Vice President JD Vance was questioned about the report while visiting Hungary. Vance said that "I would actually like to talk to Cardinal Cristophe Pierre and, frankly, to our people, to figure out what actually happened," adding "I think it's always a bad idea to offer an opinion on stories that are unconfirmed and uncorroborated, so I'm not going to do that."

A Department of Defense spokesperson told Newsweek that the report on the meeting was "highly exaggerated and distorted", adding "the meeting between Pentagon and Vatican officials was a respectful and reasonable discussion. We have nothing but the highest regard and welcome continued dialogue with the Holy See."

On 10 April 2026, the Vatican's spokesperson issued a statement saying "the narrative offered by some media outlets about this meeting does not correspond to the truth in any way."

=== Retirement ===
On 7 March 2026, Pope Leo XIV accepted Pierre's resignation as apostolic nuncio to the United States, as he had reached the age limit of 80, and appointed Archbishop Gabriele Giordano Caccia in his place.

== See also ==
- Cardinals created by Francis
- List of heads of the diplomatic missions of the Holy See

Diplomatic posts
Preceded by Lorenzo Baldisseri	Apostolic Nuncio to Haiti; 12 July 1995 – 10 May 1999	Succeeded by Luigi Bonazzi
Preceded by Luis Robles Díaz	Apostolic Nuncio to Uganda; 10 May 1999 – 22 March 2007	Succeeded by Paul Tschang In-Nam
Preceded by Giuseppe Bertello	Apostolic Nuncio to Mexico; 22 March 2007 – 12 April 2016	Succeeded by Franco Coppola
Preceded by Carlo Maria Vigano	Apostolic Nuncio to the United States; 12 April 2016 – 7 March 2026	Succeeded by Gabriele Giordano Caccia
Catholic Church titles
Preceded by Emilio Bataclan	Titular Archbishop of Gunela; 24 September 1995 – 30 September 2023	Succeeded by Keith J. Chylinski
Preceded by Achille Silvestrini	Cardinal Deacon of San Benedetto fuori Porta San Paolo; 30 September 2023 – present	Incumbent
