= Apostolic Nunciature to Mexico =

Diplomatic Mission of the Holy See in Mexico

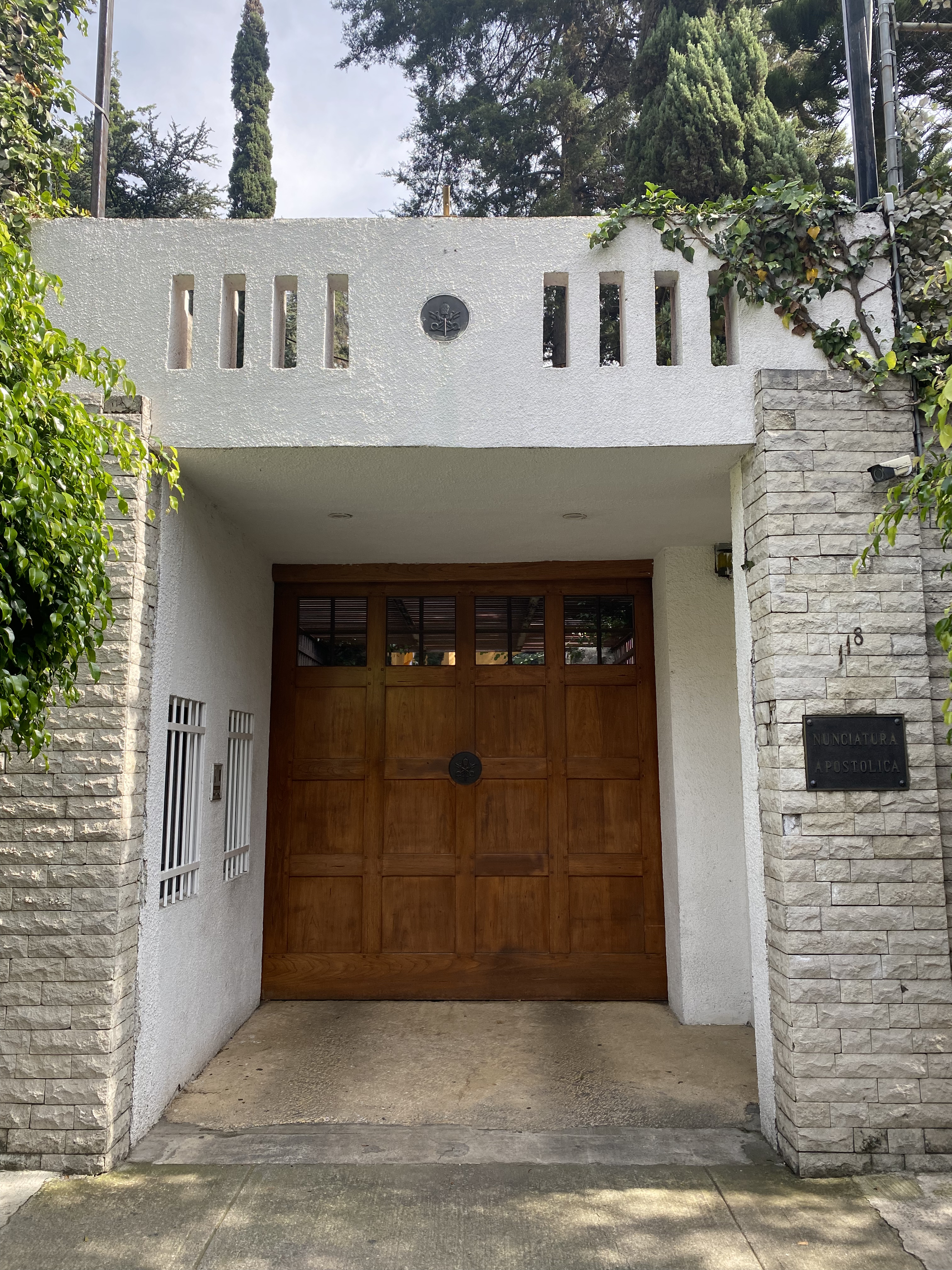
- Location: Mexico City
- Address: Juan Pablo II 118, Guadalupe Inn, Álvaro Obregón, Mexico City, Mexico
- Coordinates: 19°21′34.2″N 99°11′05.1″W
- Apostolic Nuncio: Joseph Spiteri

The Apostolic Nunciature to Mexico is the diplomatic mission of the Holy See to Mexico. It is located in Álvaro Obregón, Mexico City. The current Apostolic Nuncio is Bishop Joseph Spiteri, who was named to the position by Pope Francis on 7 July 2022.

The Apostolic Nunciature to the United Mexican States is an ecclesiastical office of the Catholic Church in Mexico, with the rank of an embassy. The nuncio serves both as the ambassador of the Holy See to the President of Mexico, and as delegate and point-of-contact between the Catholic hierarchy in Mexico and the Pope.

== History ==
Before 1992 the office was an Apostolic Delegation, without diplomatic status: its head was accredited to the Catholic Church in the country but not to the government. Pope John Paul II established the Nunciature to Mexico on 22 September 1992.

== Papal representatives to Mexico ==
Apostolic Delegates

- Luigi Clementi (26 August 1851 - 1861)
- Pier Francesco Meglia (1 October 1864 - 21 October 1866)
- Domenico Serafini, O.S.B. (6 January 1904 – 2 March 1912)
- Tommaso Pio Boggiani, O.P. (10 January 1912 – 1919)
- Pietro Benedetti (10 March 1921 – 22 July 1921)
- Ernesto Eugenio Filippi (22 July 1921 – 31 March 1923)
- Serafino Cimino, O.F.M. (18 December 1924 – May 1925)
- George J. Caruana (22 December 1925 – 1929)
- Leopoldo Ruiz y Flóres (10 October 1929 – 1937)
- Guglielmo Piani, S.D.B. (13 April 1951 (Note: Piani is identified as Delegate to Mexico on 31 June 1951.) – 27 September 1956)
- Luigi Raimondi (15 December 1956 – 30 June 1967)
- Guido Del Mestri (9 September 1967 – 20 June 1970)
- Carlo Martini (6 July 1970 – 2 June 1973 )
- Mario Pio Gaspari (6 June 1973 – 16 November 1977)
- Sotero Sanz Villalba (24 November 1977 – 17 January 1978)
- Girolamo Prigione (7 February 1978 – 12 October 1992)

Apostolic Nuncios

- Girolamo Prigione (12 October 1992 – 2 April 1997)
- Justo Mullor García (2 April 1997 – 11 February 2000)
- Leonardo Sandri (1 March 2000 – 16 September 2000)
- Giuseppe Bertello (27 December 2000 – 19 December 2006)
- Christophe Pierre (22 March 2007 – 12 April 2016)
- Franco Coppola (9 July 2016 – 15 November 2021)
- Joseph Spiteri (7 July 2022 - present)

== See also ==
- Bilateral relations between Mexico and the Holy See (1821-1855)
- Holy See–Mexico relations
