= Diocese of Gómez Palacio =

Roman Catholic diocese in Mexico

Coordinates: 25.5683°N 103.5008°W

Diocese of Gómez Palacio Dioecesis Gomez-Palaciensis Diócesis de Gómez Palacio

Location
- Country: Mexico
- Ecclesiastical province: Province of Durango
- Metropolitan: Gómez Palacio, Durango

Statistics
- Area: 7,379 sq mi (19,110 km^{2})
- Population: Total; Catholics: (as of 2013); 585,000; 468,000 (80.0%)
- Parishes: 38

Information
- Denomination: Roman Catholic
- Rite: Roman Rite
- Established: 25 November 2008 (16 years ago)
- Cathedral: Cathedral of Our Lady of Guadalupe
- Secular priests: 51

Current leadership
- Pope: Leo XIV
- Bishop: Jorge Estrada Solórzano

Map
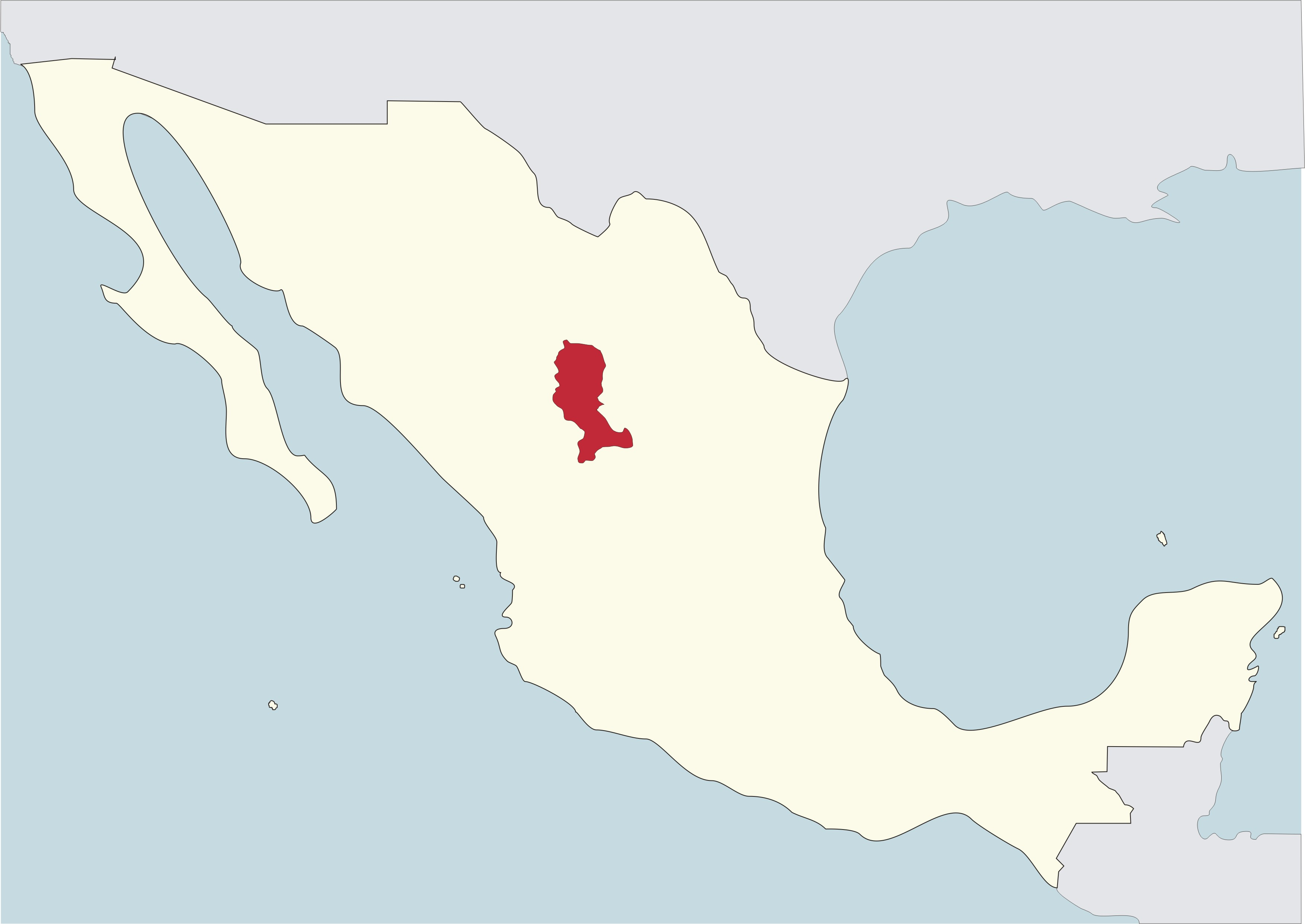

The Roman Catholic Diocese of Gómez Palacio (Latin: Dioecesis Gomez-Palaciensis) is located in Mexico. It is a suffragan diocese of the Archdiocese of Durango from which it was erected by Pope Benedict XVI in 2008.

== Ordinaries ==
- José Guadalupe Torres Campos (2008–2014), appointed Bishop of Ciudad Juárez, Chihuahua
- José Fortunato Álvarez Valdéz (2015-2018)
- Jorge Estrada Solórzano (2019-)

== Episcopal See ==
- Gómez Palacio, Durango

== External links and references ==
- "Diocese of Gómez Palacio". Catholic-Hierarchy.
