= José Fortunato Álvarez Valdez =

Mexican Roman Catholic bishop (1967–2018)

His Excellency, The Most Reverend José Fortunato Álvarez Valdez
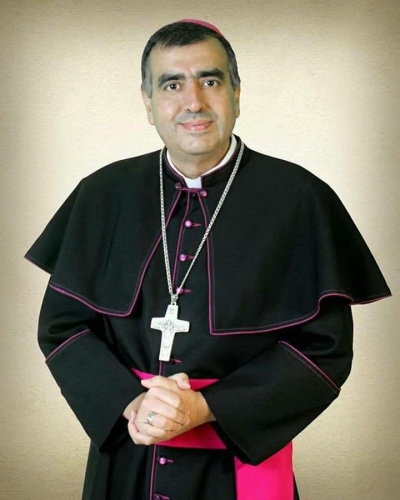
- Bishop José Fortunato Álvarez Valdez
- Church: Roman Catholic Church
- Appointed: 30 December 2015
- Predecessor: José Guadalupe Torres Camposs

Orders
- Ordination: 31 May 1998
- Consecration: 16 March 2016 by Christophe Pierre, José Antonio Fernández Hurtado, Bishop José Isidro Guerrero Macías

Personal details
- Born: Bishop José Fortunato Álvarez Valdéz; November 8, 1967 Mexicali, Baja California, Mexico
- Died: November 7, 2018 (aged 50) Mexicali, Baja California, Mexico

José Fortunato Álvarez Valdez (8 November 1967 in Mexicali, Baja California – 7 November 2018 in Mexicali) was ordained to the priesthood in 1998. He served as bishop of the Roman Catholic Diocese of Gómez Palacio from 2016 until his death a day shy of his 51st birthday.
