= Holy See–Mexico relations =

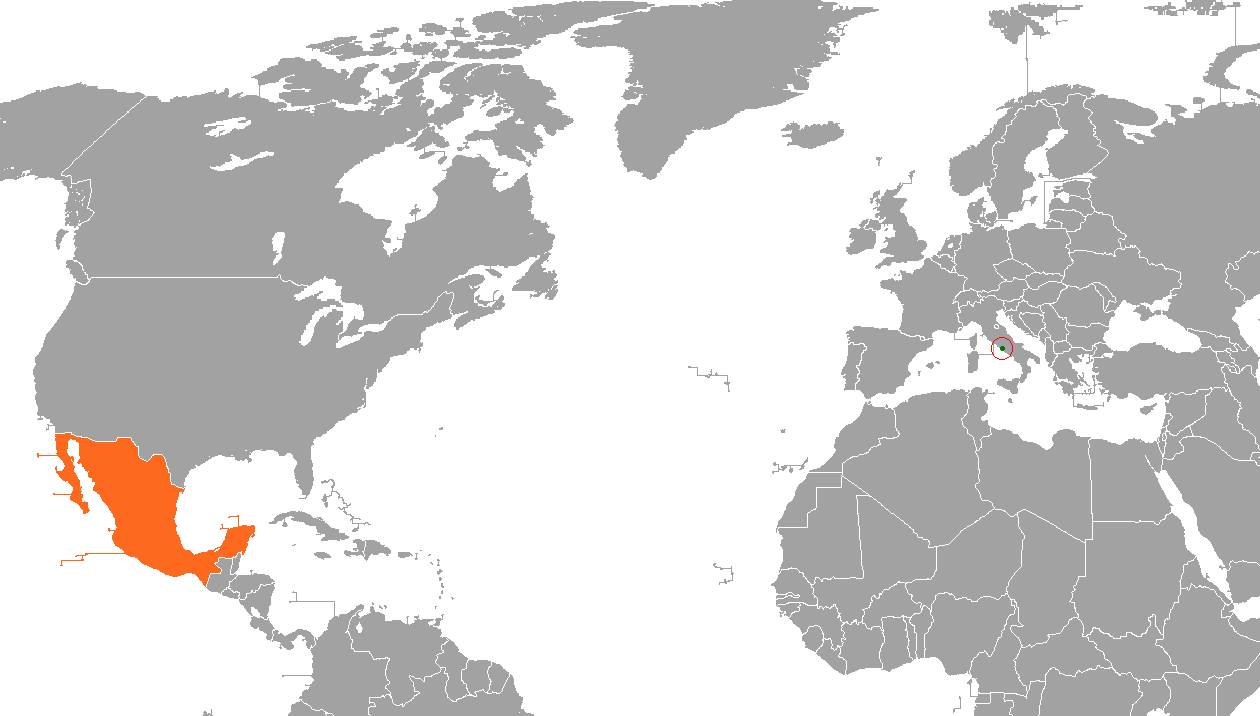

- Holy See: Mexico

The Holy See (Vatican City) and Mexico have a long-standing contact and foreign relations. Catholicism was introduced in Mexico in 1519 by the Spanish Empire. The majority of Mexicans practice the Catholic faith, however, since the adoption of the current Constitution in 1917, Mexico is a secular nation.

== History ==
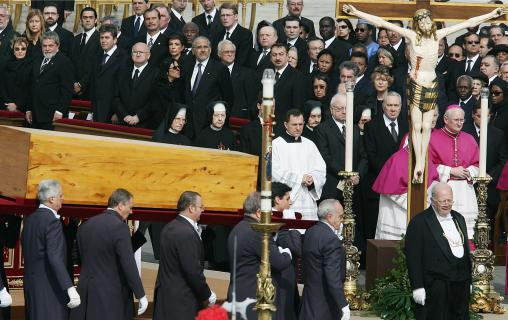
President Vicente Fox attending the funeral of Pope John Paul II in April 2005.

In 1904, the Holy See assigned an Apostolic Delegate as resident representative in Mexico. The Holy See and Mexico broke diplomatic relations after Mexican President Benito Juárez confiscated church property between 1856 and 1861. President Juárez disbanded religious orders and ordered the separation of church and state in the new Constitution of Mexico, making Mexico a secular country. Some of the powers of the Catholic Church were reinstated by President Porfirio Diaz.

In 1926, after several years of the Mexican Revolution and insecurity, President Plutarco Elías Calles, leader of the ruling Institutional Revolutionary Party, enacted the Calles Law, which eradicated all the personal property of the churches, closed churches that were not registered with the State, and prohibited clerics from holding public office. The law was unpopular, and several protesters from rural areas fought against federal troops in what became known as the Cristero War. After the war's end in 1929, President Emilio Portes Gil upheld a previous truce where the law would remain enacted, but not enforced, in exchange for the hostilities to end.

In 1974, Mexican President Luis Echeverría paid a visit to the Holy See, becoming the first Mexican head-of-state to do so. In 1979, Pope John Paul II became the first Papal leader to visit Mexico. In 1992, after more than 130 years, the Mexican Government re-established formal diplomatic relations with the Holy See. That same year, resident diplomatic missions were established.

In 2016 Pope Francis paid a visit to Mexico. During his visit to Mexico, Pope Francis, in reference to the Mexico–United States border wall, stated that "A person who only thinks of building walls, and not building bridges, is not Christian". This statement was made in reference to the comments made by U.S. President Donald Trump's with regard to the border wall.

Each year, Mexico donates two nativity scenes and Christmas decorations to the Vatican as part of a cultural event known as “Mexican Christmas in the Vatican” and “Hands of the World in the Vatican.”

== High-level visits ==
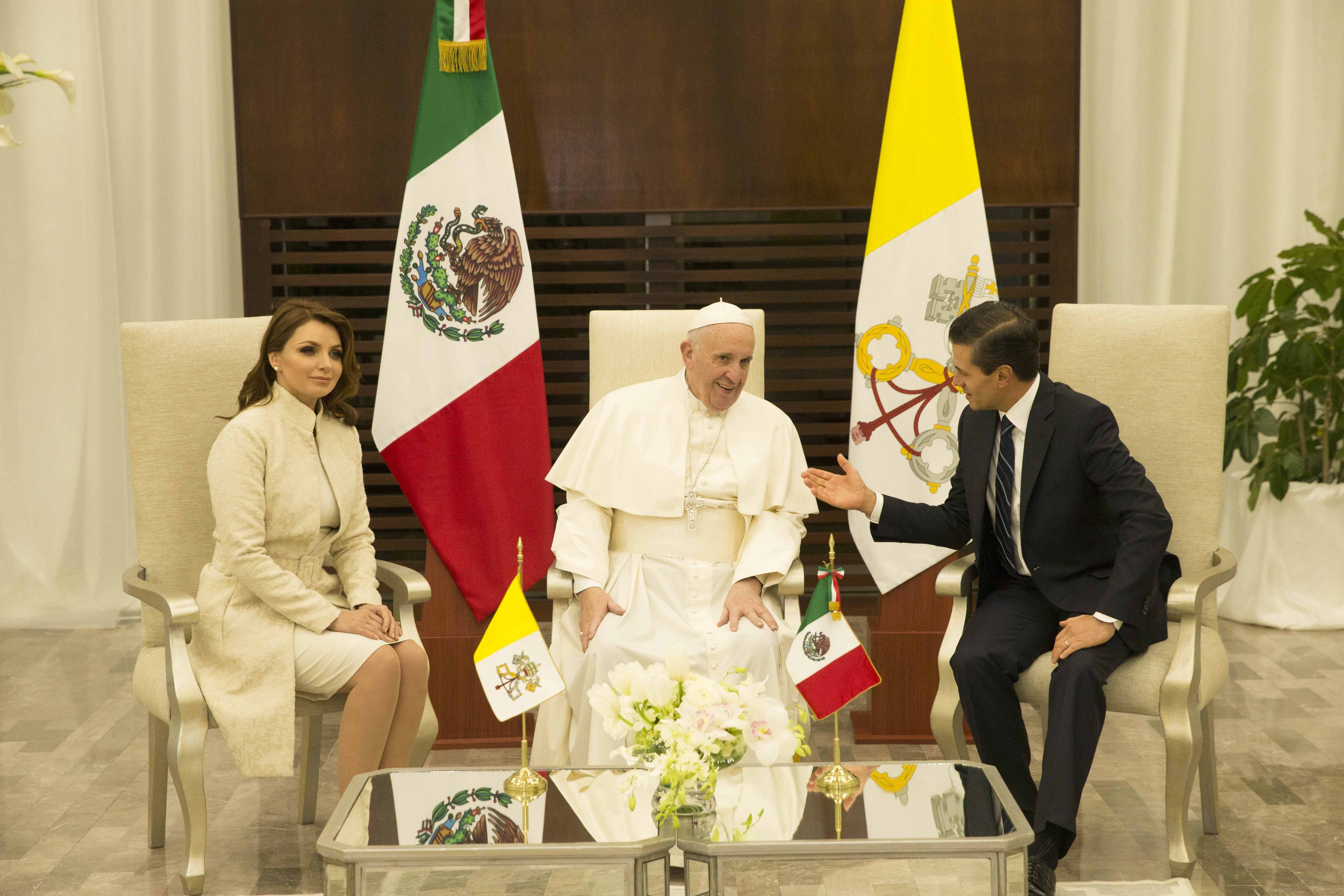
Pope Francis and President Enrique Peña Nieto, accompanied by First Lady Angélica Rivera, held a meeting in the premises of the Presidential hangar following the Pope's arrival in Mexico.

Papal visits from the Holy See to Mexico

- Pope John Paul II (1979, 1990, 1993, 1999, 2002)
- Pope Benedict XVI (2012)
- Pope Francis (2016)

Presidential visits from Mexico to the Holy See

- President Luis Echeverría (1974)
- President Carlos Salinas de Gortari (1991)
- President Ernesto Zedillo (1996)
- President Vicente Fox (2001, 2005)
- President Felipe Calderón (2007, 2011)
- President Enrique Peña Nieto (2013, 2014)

== Resident diplomatic missions ==
- The Holy See has an Apostolic Nunciature in Mexico City.
- Mexico has a resident embassy to the Holy See in Rome.

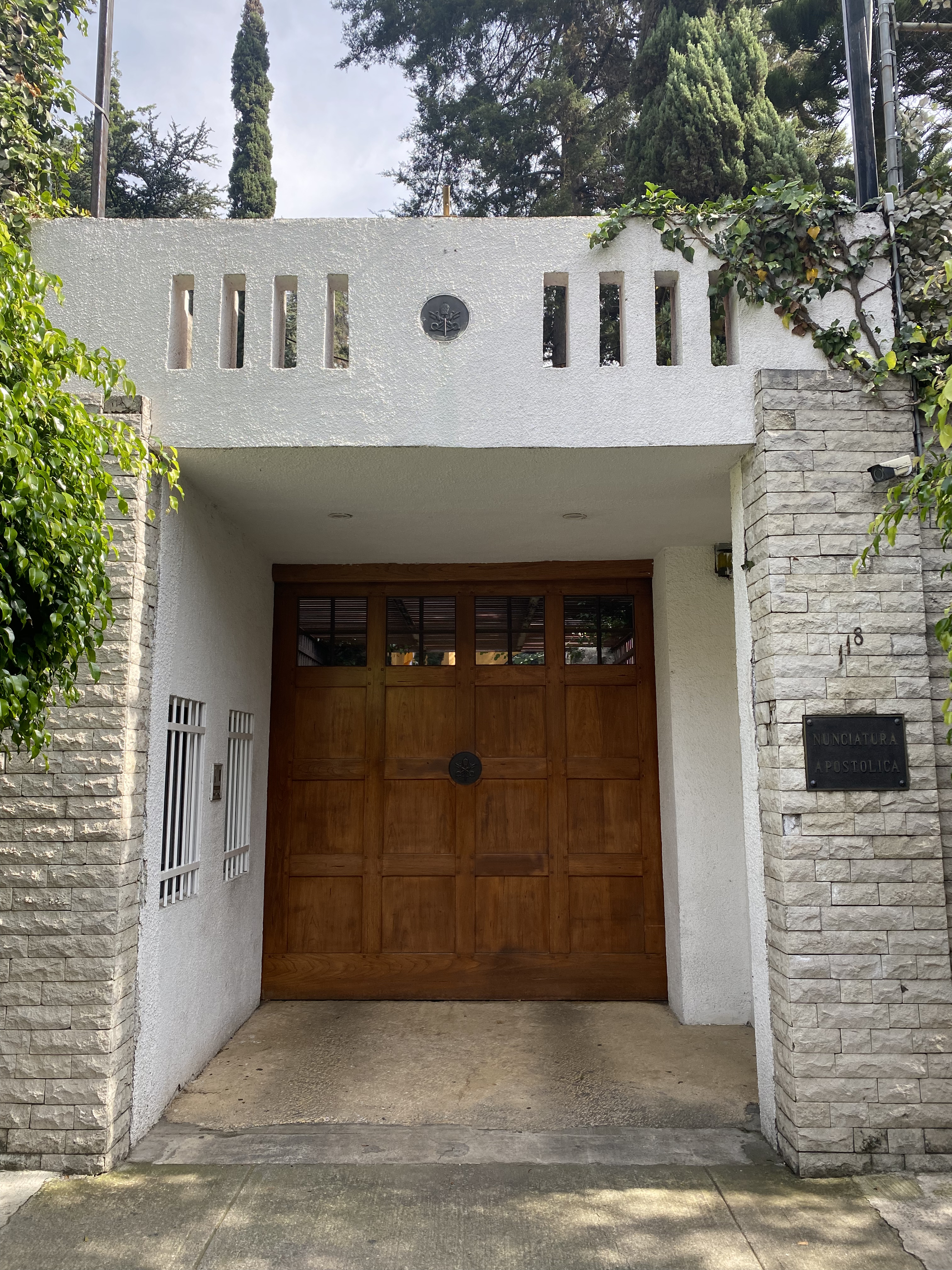
Apostolic Nunciature in Mexico City

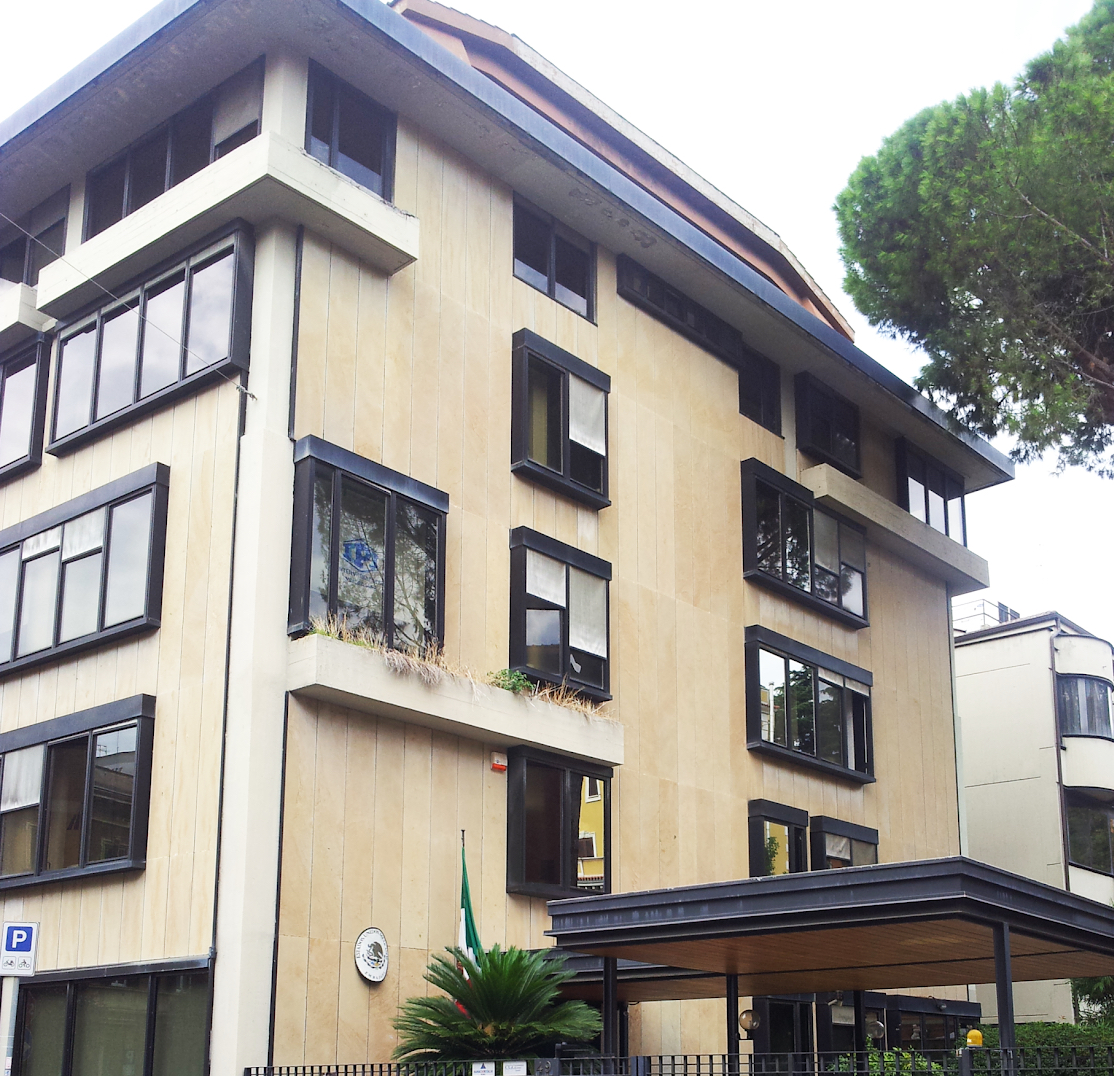
Embassy of Mexico to the Holy See in Rome

== See also ==
- Index of Vatican City-related articles
- Apostolic Nunciature to Mexico
- Bilateral relations between Mexico and the Holy See (1821–1855)
- Catholic Church in Mexico
- Saints of the Cristero War
- Sexual abuse cases of Marcial Maciel
