= San Benedetto fuori Porta San Paolo =

- Church of Saint Benedict Outside Saint Paul's Gate
- Chiesa di San Benedetto al Gazometro
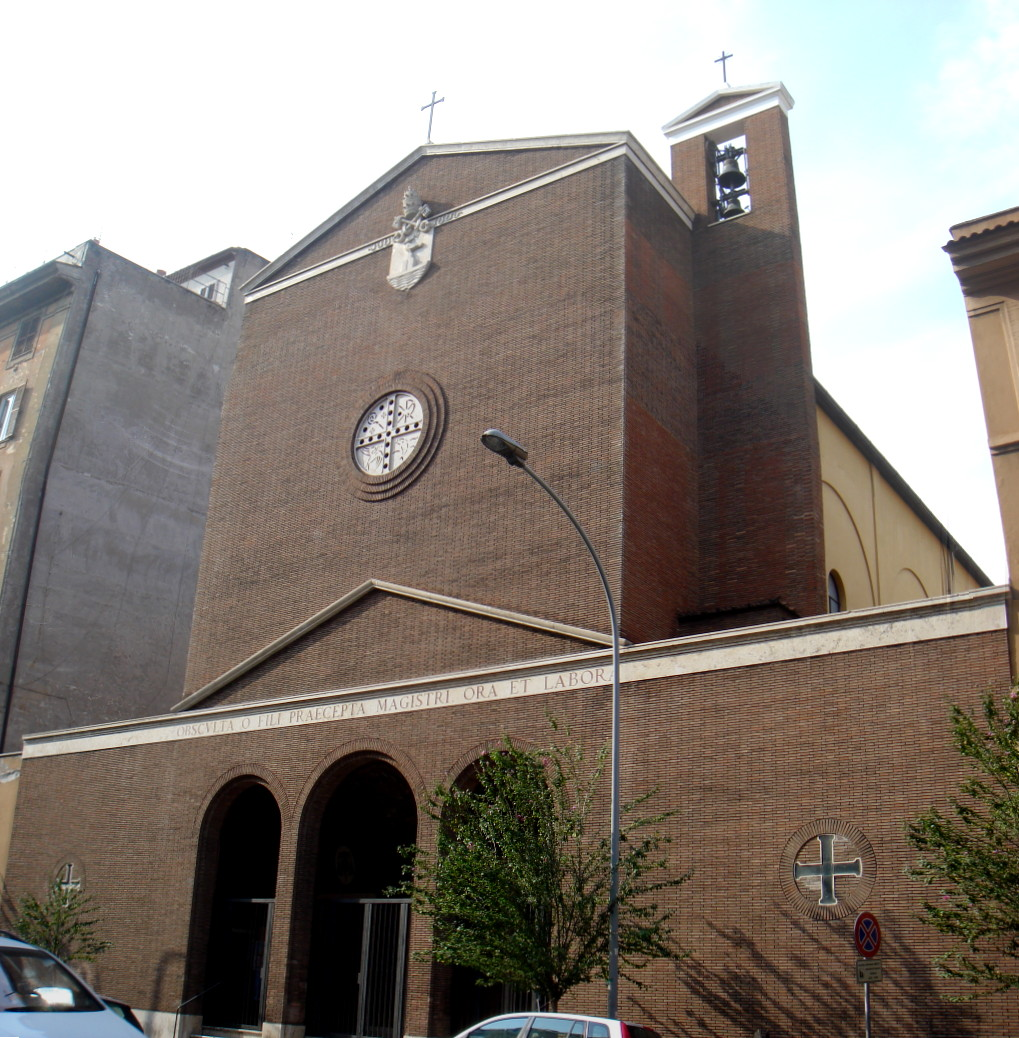

- Location within Rome
- 41°52′17″N 12°28′43″E
- Location: Via del Gazometro 23, Q. Ostiense, Rome
- Country: Italy
- Language: Italian
- Denomination: Catholic
- Tradition: Roman Rite
- Website: parrocchiasanbenedetto.org

History
- Status: titular church, parish church
- Founded: 1912
- Founder: Pope Pius X
- Dedication: Benedict of Nursia

Architecture
- Functional status: active
- Architect: Clemente Busiri Vici
- Architectural type: Rationalist
- Groundbreaking: 1916
- Completed: 1925

Administration
- Diocese: Rome

San Benedetto fuori Porta San Paolo is a 20th-century parochial church and titular church on the southern edge of Rome, dedicated to Saint Benedict of Nursia.

== History ==
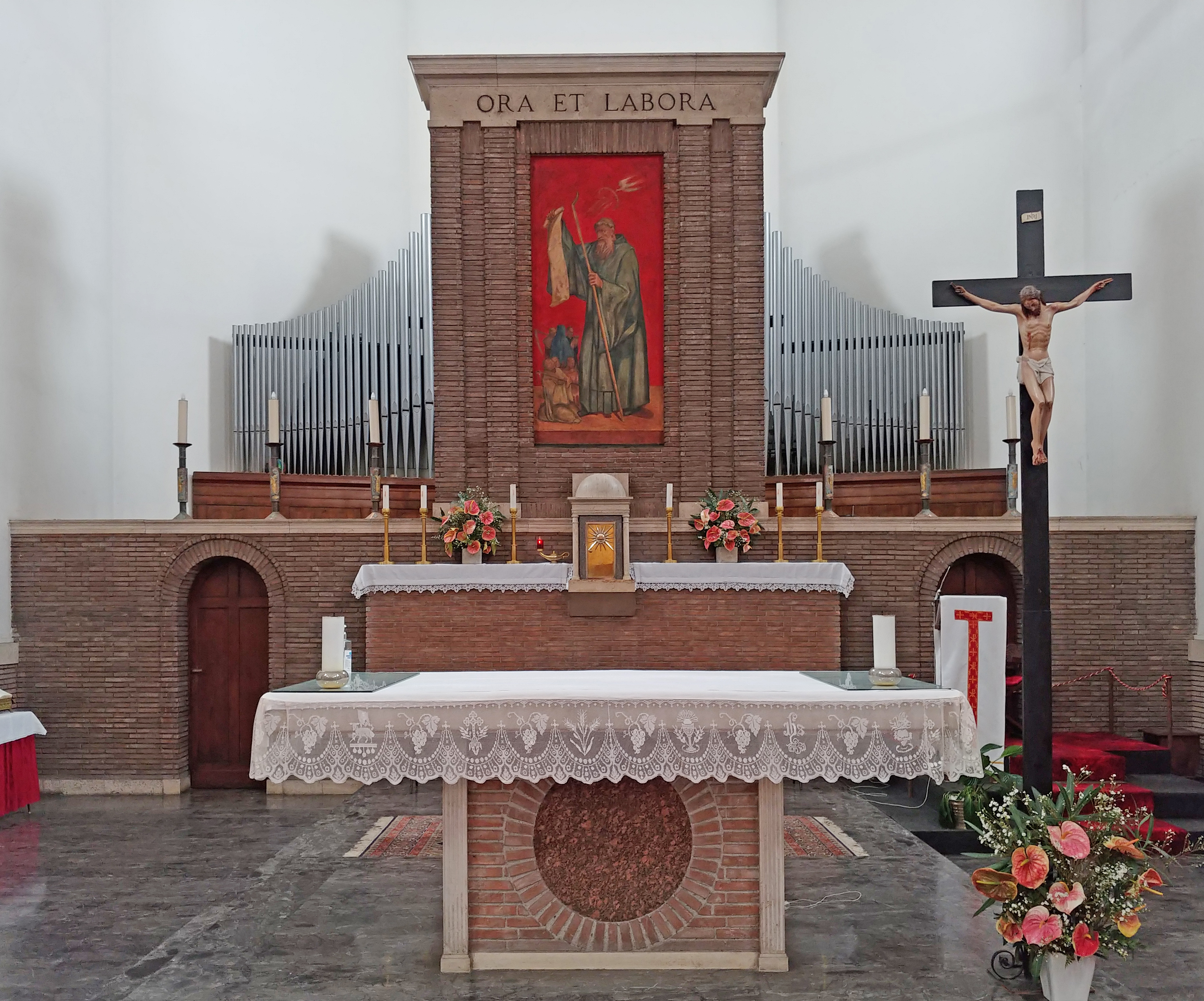
Main altar

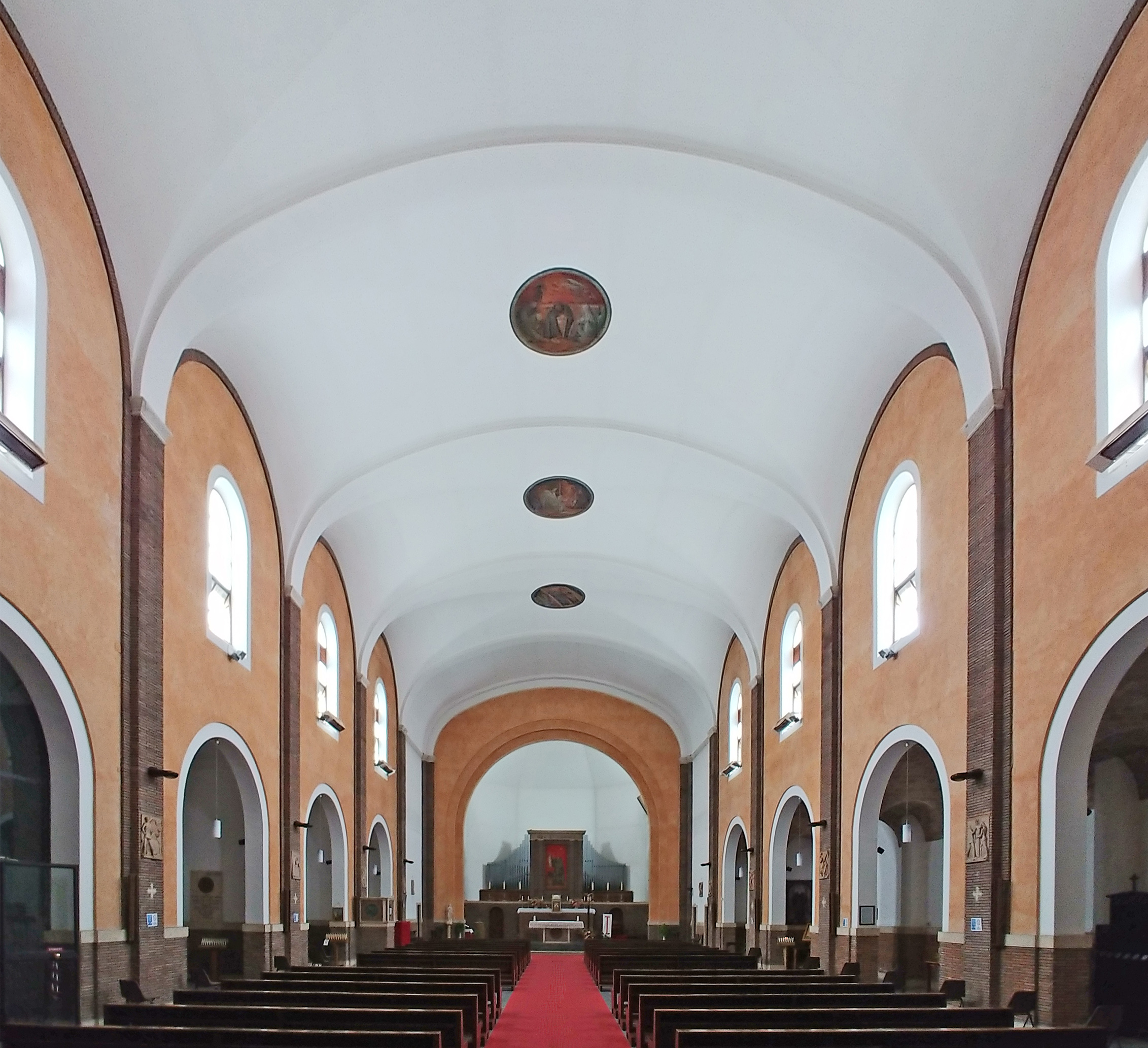
View of interior

San Benedetto fuori Porta San Paolo was built in 1916–1925. Don Giovanni Gregorucci helped Jews to hide in the church during The Holocaust. The building was damaged during the 1944 Liberation of Rome. Ferruccio Ferrazzi painted five tondi and an altarpiece for San Benedetto in 1949.

Pope John Paul II visited on 14 February 1988. On 28 June 1988, it was made a titular church to be held by a cardinal-deacon.

Cardinal-Protectors

- Achille Silvestrini (1988–2019); promoted to cardinal-priest in 1999 but remained as titulus of San Benedetto fuori Porta San Paolo pro hac vice
- Christophe Pierre (2023–present)
