= George J. Caruana =

Maltese prelate of the Catholic Church

His Excellency George Joseph Caruana
- Titular Archbishop of Sebastea
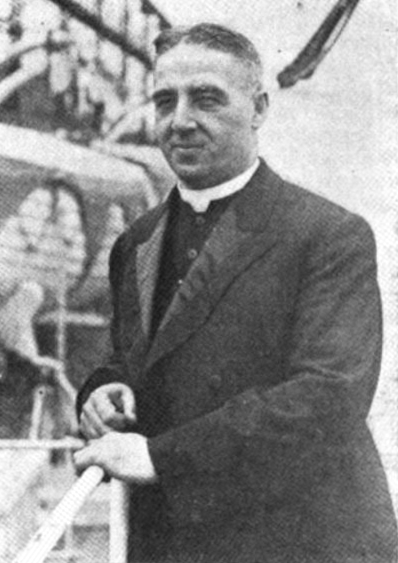
- Church: Roman Catholic Church
- Other posts: Apostolic Delegate to México; Apostolic Delegate to Antilles; Apostolic Internuncio to Haiti; Apostolic Nuncio to Cuba

Orders
- Ordination: 28 October 1905 by Pietro Pace
- Consecration: 28 October 1921 by Antonio Vico
- Rank: Archbishop

Personal details
- Born: 23 April 1882 Sliema, Malta
- Died: 25 March 1951 (aged 68) Philadelphia, Pennsylvania, United States
- Buried: McAuley Convent Chapel Cemetery
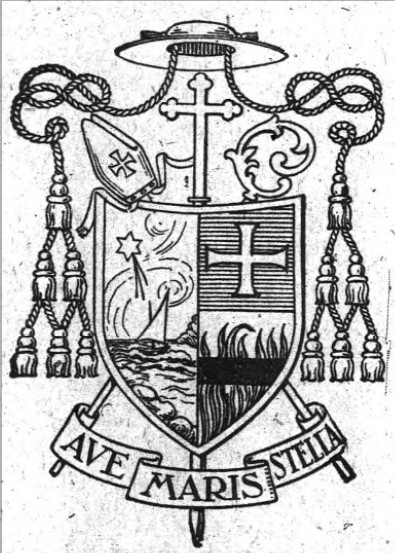
- Coat of arms

George Joseph Caruana (23 April 1882 – 25 March 1951) was a Maltese prelate of the Roman Catholic Church whose career included parish work, several years as a missionary in the Philippines and as a military chaplain, four years as Archbishop of Puerto Rico, and more than two decades in the diplomatic service of the Holy See.

== Biography ==
Caruana was born in Sliema, Malta, on 23 April 1882. He attended the college of St Ignatius in Birkirkara and Capranica College and the Pontifical Gregorian University in Rome. He was ordained a priest of the Archdiocese of Malta on 28 October 1905 by Archbishop Pietro Pace of Malta.

In 1907, he was appointed secretary to the Apostolic Delegate in the Philippines, Mgr. Ambrose Agius, OSB, and he was present at the 1st Provincial Council of Manila in October 1907. After a few months working in the Apostolic Delegation, he left to work as a missionary among semi-savage pagan tribes. After three years he moved to the United States and settled in Brooklyn. He eventually became an American citizen.

Caruana worked in Brooklyn as a parish priest. During World War I he became a chaplain in the United States Armed Forces, serving in the Panama Canal Zone and Puerto Rico until 1919. After the war Caruana became secretary to Dennis Joseph Dougherty, the Archbishop of Philadelphia, who became a cardinal in 1921.

On 5 August 1921, Pope Benedict XV appointed Caruana Archbishop of Puerto Rico. (Note: The Archdiocese of Puerto Rico was reorganized and renamed the Archdiocese of Saint John of Puerto Rico on 21 November 1924.) He received his episcopal consecration on 28 October 1921 from Cardinal Antonio Vico.

On 22 December 1925 Caruana was appointed the Apostolic Delegate to México and Apostolic Delegate to the Antilles, as well as titular archbishop of Sebastea. Though he planned to make Cuba his residence, he arrived in Mexico in March 1926 just as the government of President Calles launched an anti-Catholic campaign that included enforcement and expansion of the anti-clerical provisions of the Mexican Constitution of 1917. On 15 May the government ordered him to leave, citing his failure to identify himself as a clergyman.

On 8 March 1927 he was appointed Apostolic Internuncio to Haiti.

On 15 September 1935, Pope Pius XI appointed him Apostolic Nuncio to Cuba.

His diplomatic career ended when he was replaced in Cuba on 14 May 1947 by Antonio Taffi.

Caruana died on 25 March 1951 at Misericordia Hospital in Philadelphia. He was buried in McAuley Convent Chapel Cemetery in Merion, Pennsylvania.

== External links and additional sources ==
- Cheney, David M. "Archdiocese of San Juan de Puerto Rico". Catholic-Hierarchy.org. ^{[self-published]}
- Chow, Gabriel. "Metropolitan Archdiocese of San Juan de Puerto Rico". GCatholic.org. ^{[self-published]}
- George J. Caruana at Find a Grave
