= Mosque of Prophet Huri =

Former mosque in Aleppo, Syria

Mosque of the Prophet Huri
- مسجد النبي هوري; Mizgefta Pêxemberê Hurî
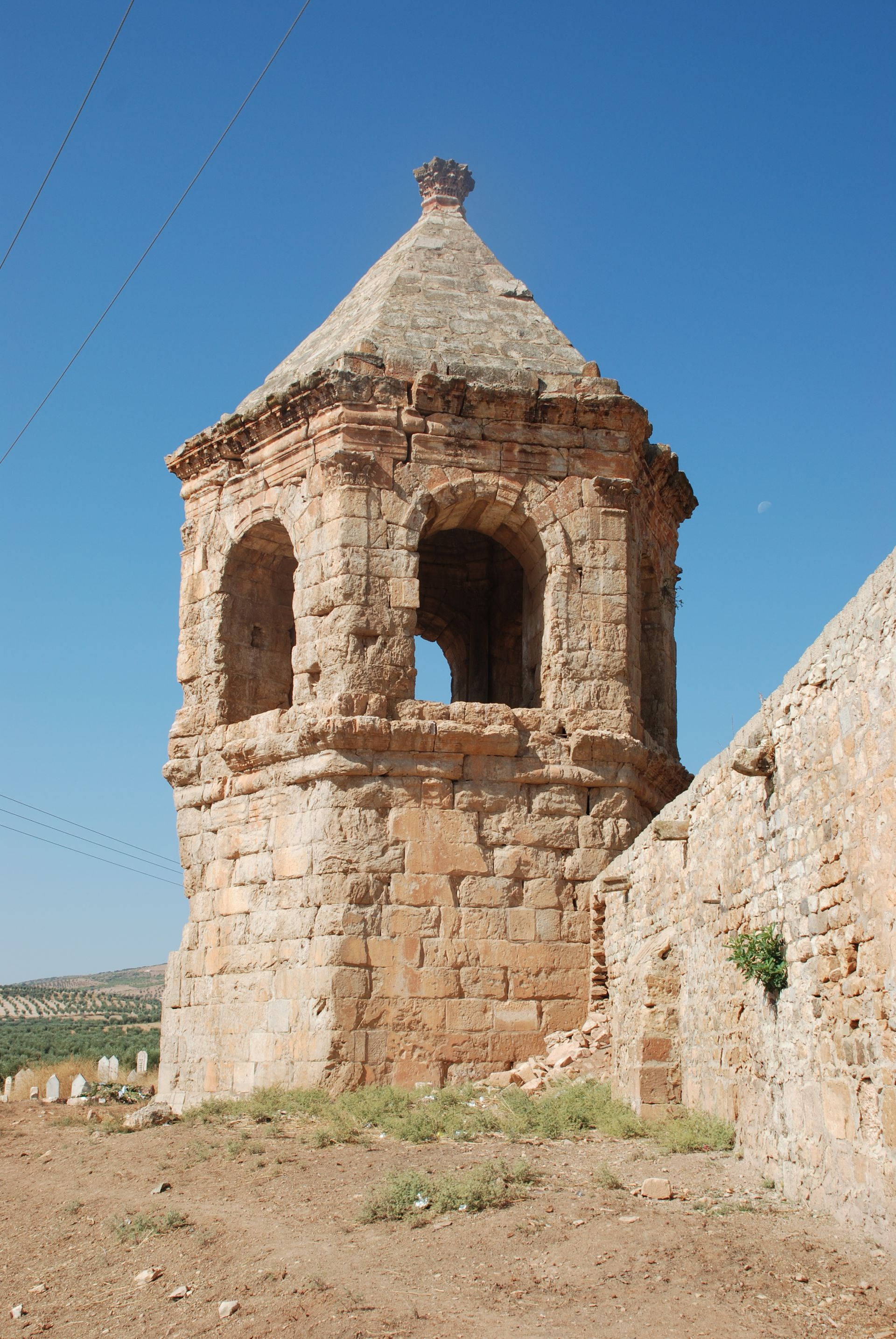
- The pyramidal-roofed tower tomb of Nebi Huri, part of the mosque complex

- Location in Aleppo Governorate Mosque of Prophet Huri (Turkey)

Religion
- Affiliation: Sunni Islam
- Rite: Sufism
- Ecclesiastical or organisational status: Mosque and mausoleum
- Status: Active

Location
- Location: Cyrrhus, Aleppo Governorate
- Country: Syria
- Interactive map of Mosque of the Prophet Huri
- Coordinates: 36°44′07″N 36°57′13″E

Architecture
- Type: Mausoleum and mosque
- Style: Roman; Mamluk; Ottoman
- General contractor: Ala ad-Din ibn Altunbugha (mosque); Erdogan (present complex)
- Completed: 2nd-3rd century BCE (mausoleum); 1303 CE (shrine); 1314 CE (mosque)

Specifications
- Shrine: 1
- Materials: Stone

The Mosque of the Prophet Huri or Nebi Huri Mosque (Arabic: مسجد النبي هوري; Kurmanji Kurdish: Mizgefta Pêxemberê Hurî) is a mosque and mausoleum located at the archaeological site of Cyrrhus near Afrin, Syria. It was formerly known as the Nebi Huri Mausoleum (ضريح النبي هوري) as well.

It is built around a Roman-period hexagonal tower tomb which was converted into an Islamic shrine or mausoleum during the Mamluk period.

== Nebi Huri ==
Nebi Huri was a Sufi saint, whom the locals believed had the abilities to grant the wishes of anyone who was sincere. Other traditions cite the name of Nebi Huri as being "Prophet Huri" as an Islamicized version of Uriah the Hittite who was a military general for the army of King David. However, the tomb is actually that of a military commander who worked under the Roman Empire.

== History ==
=== Roman era ===
The building was originally a hexagonal tower tomb, dated to have been built during the 2nd or 3rd century BCE, during the rule of the Roman Empire. It is also described as being a tomb for a Roman military commander. The site surrounding the tomb, and possibly the tomb itself, was damaged in 1140 CE, during Crusader rule, by a huge earthquake.

=== Mamluk era ===
In 1303 CE, during the rule of the Mamluk Sultanate, the tower tomb was given a new attribution to a saint named Nebi Huri. The Roman cemetery next to the tomb became used for Muslim burials. In the same year, the tower tomb was converted into a Muslim shrine, and its bottom level became known as the grave of Nebi Huri. In 1314 CE, a mosque was built next to the tower tomb by Ala ad-Din ibn Altunbugha, the Mamluk governor of Aleppo.

=== Ottoman era ===
In 1875, during Ottoman rule, the old Mamluk-era mosque was demolished and a new mosque building replaced it. The mosque was used as a congregational mosque, where the Friday prayers were performed. It was a prominent site of visit by the residents of nearby villages.

=== Modern history ===
The tower tomb was damaged and looted during the Afrin offensive in 2018. It was reported that soldiers of the Free Syrian Army ransacked the tomb looking for treasure. They had also overturned the wooden cenotaph over the tomb of Nebi Huri, and threw rubbish all over the tomb's floor. Precious items were allegedly stolen from the places around the tomb as well.

In 2020, after the wars in that region had ended, Turkish authorities reconstructed the Nebi Huri mausoleum. It was also incorporated into part of a larger mosque complex, known as "Mosque of the Prophet Huri", but several artefacts which remained at the site were destroyed and removed. The Turkish renovations added a wooden balcony to the mosque, but the minbar of the mosque was replaced with a new wooden one which was more evocative of Ottoman architecture. The restoration efforts by the Turkish government were criticized as an attempt to "Ottoman-nize" Syrian history and heritage, because historical heritage was removed and destroyed during the renovation.

== Gallery ==
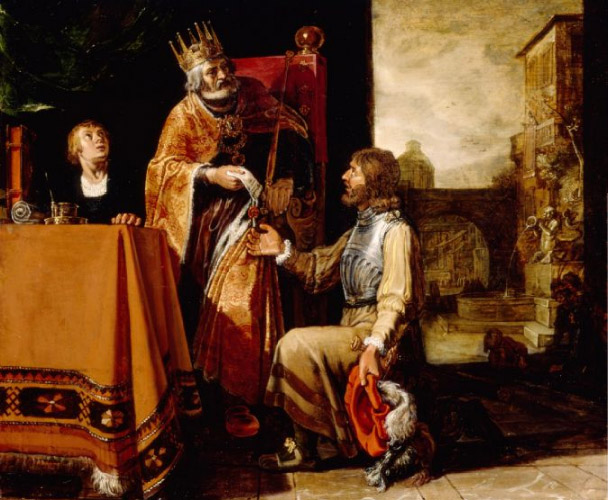
A 17th-century painting featuring King David and Uriah (who is kneeling) by Pieter Lastman, painted in 1611

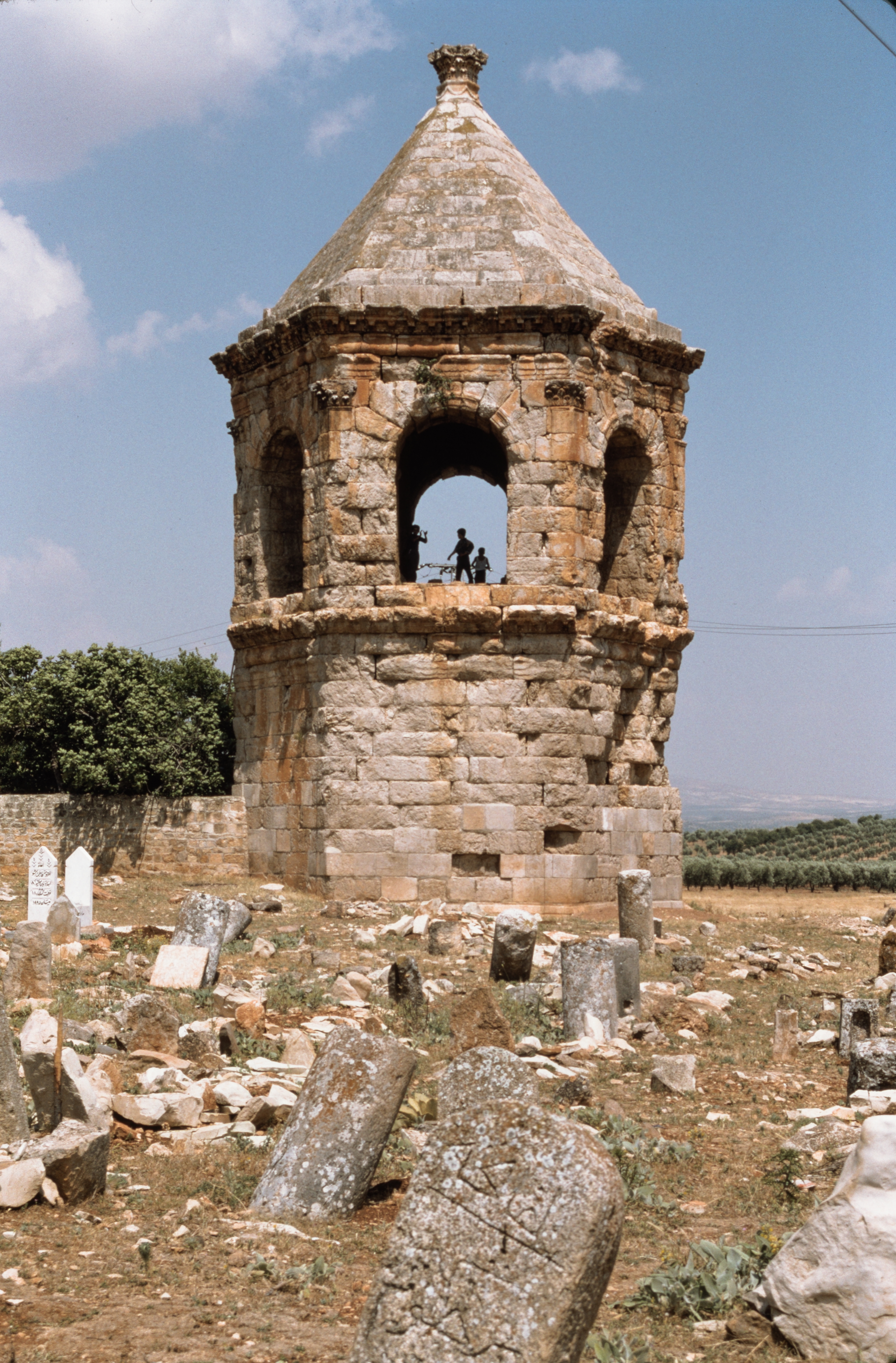
View of the southern facade of the hexagonal tower tomb of Nebi Huri

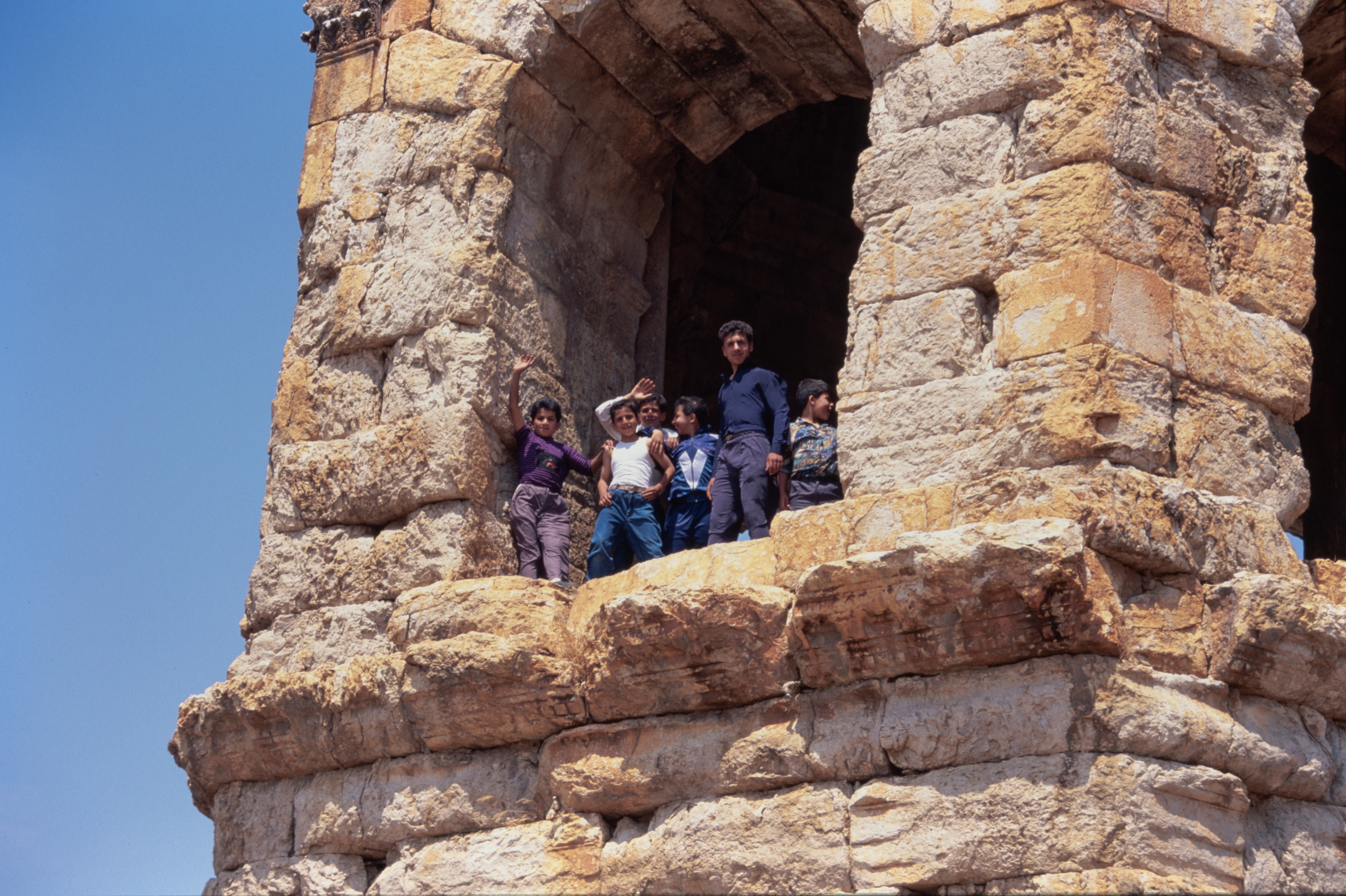
Alawite refugees at the top floor of the Nebi Huri mausoleum

== See also ==
- Syrian Civil War
- SDF insurgency in northern Syria
- Afrin offensive (January–March 2018)
- Sunni Islam in Syria
- List of mosques in Syria
