= Serafino Cimino =

Italian prelate

Serafino Cimino OFM (3 October 1873 – 4 May 1928) was an Italian prelate of the Catholic Church who led the Franciscans and then served in the diplomatic service of the Holy See.

== Biography ==
Born Antonio Cimino on 3 October 1873 in Capri, Italy, he took the name Serafino as a member of the Order of Friars Minor and was ordained a priest in 1898.

He taught at the Ateneo Antoniano in Rome. For two years he did pastoral work among Italian immigrants in New York. From 1915 to 1921, he served as Minister General of the Order of Friars Minor. He led the Custody of the Holy Land from 1915 to 1918. In that capacity, he visited Constantinople and obtained security guarantees for the Custody. As superior general, he visited the Franciscan provinces in Europe and was the first general to visit the Americas as well.

On 18 December 1924, Pope Pius XI appointed him titular archbishop of Cyrrhus and Apostolic Delegate to Mexico. He received his episcopal consecration from Cardinal Gaetano de Lai on 11 January 1925. He reached Mexico on 1 April and departed for the United States for health treatment on 15 May. Several weeks later, he sought a visa to re-enter Mexico. The government, then fiercely anti-clerical, did not allow him to return. Cimino remained in the U.S. for several months before returning to Rome.

On 13 April 1926, Pope Pius named him Apostolic Nuncio to Peru.

Cimino died on board a ship en route to Italy on 4 May 1928 at the age of 54.
