= Isidorus of Cyrrhus =

Isidorus of Cyrrhus was a bishop of Cyrrhus, a Roman city in what is today Syria. Cyrrhus was at the time a diocese about forty miles square and embracing 800 parishes.

Very little is known of his life, although he was an attendee at the First Council of Constantinople in 381. Isidorus of Cyrrhus was succeeded by the noted theologian Theodoret of Cyrrhus who may have been consecrated a bishop for the purpose of succeeding Isidorus.
