= Cyrrhus =

Ancient city in northwest Syria

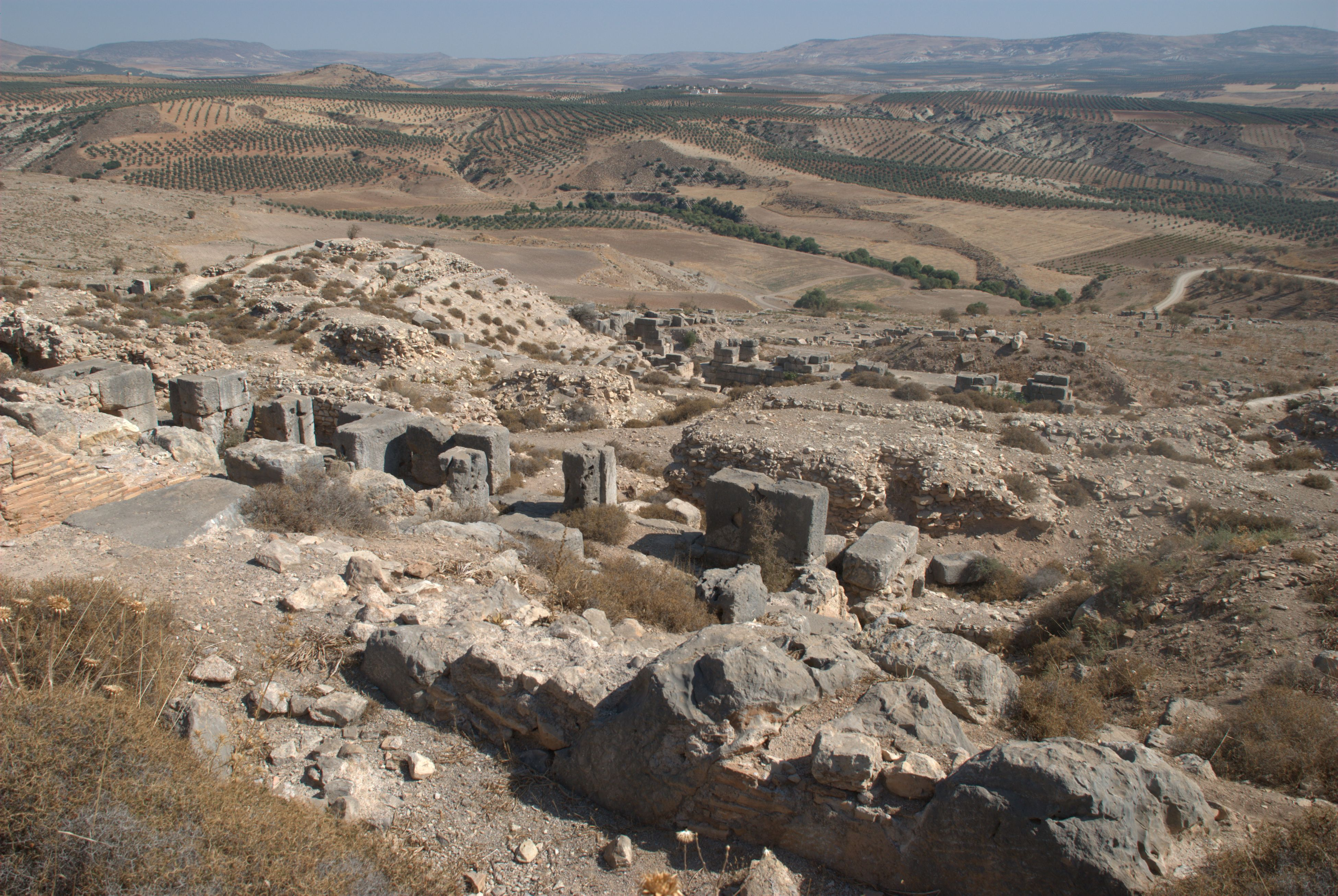
- View of Cyrrhus.

- Location within Syria
- 36°44′39″N 36°57′33″E
- Type: Settlement
- Location: Aleppo Governorate, Syria

History
- Built: 300 BC
- Built by: Seleucus I Nicator
- Abandoned: 13th century AD

Site notes
- Condition: In ruins

Cyrrhus (/ˈsɪrəs/; Greek: Κύρρος, romanized: Kyrrhos) is a city in ancient Syria founded by Seleucus Nicator, one of Alexander the Great's generals. Other names for the city include Coricium, Corice, Hagioupolis, Nebi Huri (Arabic: نبي هوري), and Khoros (حوروس, Ḳūrus). A false etymology of the sixth century connects it to Cyrus, king of Persia due to the resemblance of the names. The former Roman/Byzantine (arch)bishopric is now a double Catholic titular see.

== Location ==
Its ruins are located in northern Syria, near the Turkish border.

It lies about 70 km northwest of Aleppo and 24 km west of Killis, in Turkey. Cyrrhus was the capital of the extensive district of Cyrrhestica, between the plain of Antioch and Commagene.

The site of the city is marked by the ruins at Khoros, 20 km from Azaz, Syria, standing near the Afrin Marsyas River, a tributary of the Orontes River, which had been banked up by Bishop Theodoret.

== History ==
=== Antiquity ===
The Cyrrhus in Syria was founded by Seleucus Nicator shortly after 300 BC, and was named after the Macedonian city of Cyrrhus. Andronicus of Cyrrhus built the Tower of the Winds in Athens, but it is not known which Cyrrhus he came from.

It was taken by the Armenian Empire in the 1st century BC, then became Roman when Pompey took Syria in 64 BC. By the 1st century AD, it had become a Roman administrative, military, and commercial center on the trade route between Antioch and the Euphrates River crossing at Zeugma, and minted its own coinage. It was the base of the Roman legion Legio X Fretensis. The Sassanid Persian Empire took it several times during the 3rd century. Following these attacks the city became a major point of strategic importance for the Romans, who would rapidly develop and fortify it.

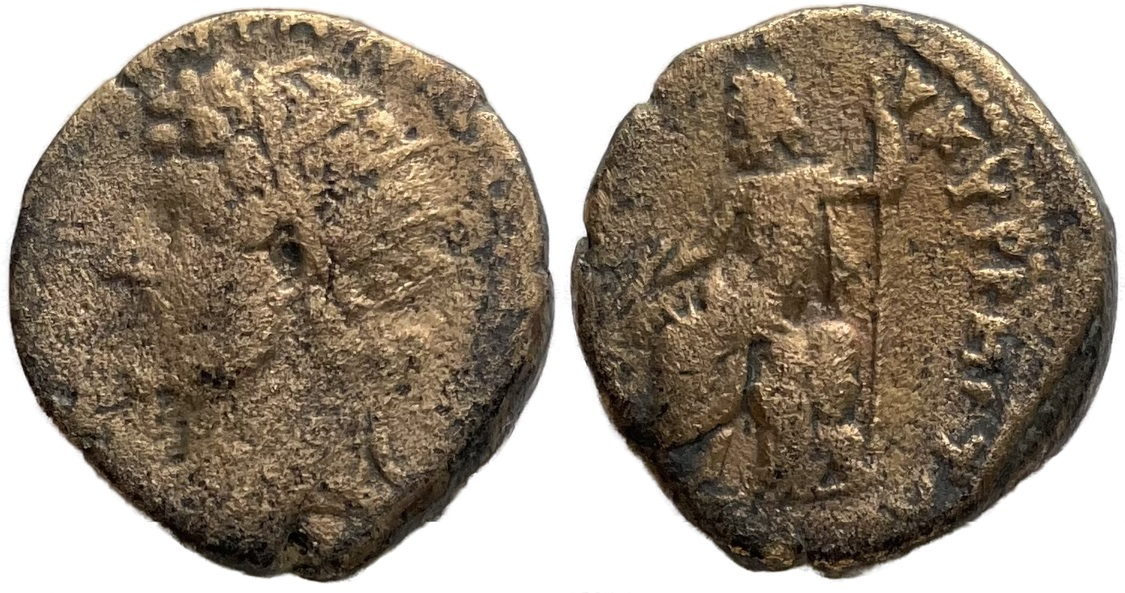
Roman provincial bronze coin from Cyrrhus, Syria minted under Marcus Aurelius

In the 6th century, the city was further embellished and strengthened by Byzantine Emperor Justinian, who oversaw work that only added to the Cyrrhus' already incredibly formidable defenses. It was however taken by the Arabs from the Byzantines in 637 AD. It was then known and identified from that time under the name of Qorosh.

=== Middle Ages ===
In the early 12th century the region was controlled by the Armenian Bagrat until it came under control of the county of Edessa in 1117. In 1150, it was captured by Nur ad-Din Zangi. Muslim travelers of the 13th and 14th century report it both as a large city and as largely in ruins.

=== Modern times ===
After Operation Olive Branch, the Syrian National Army illegally conducted extensive digging and looting of ancient historical artifacts.

== Archaeology ==
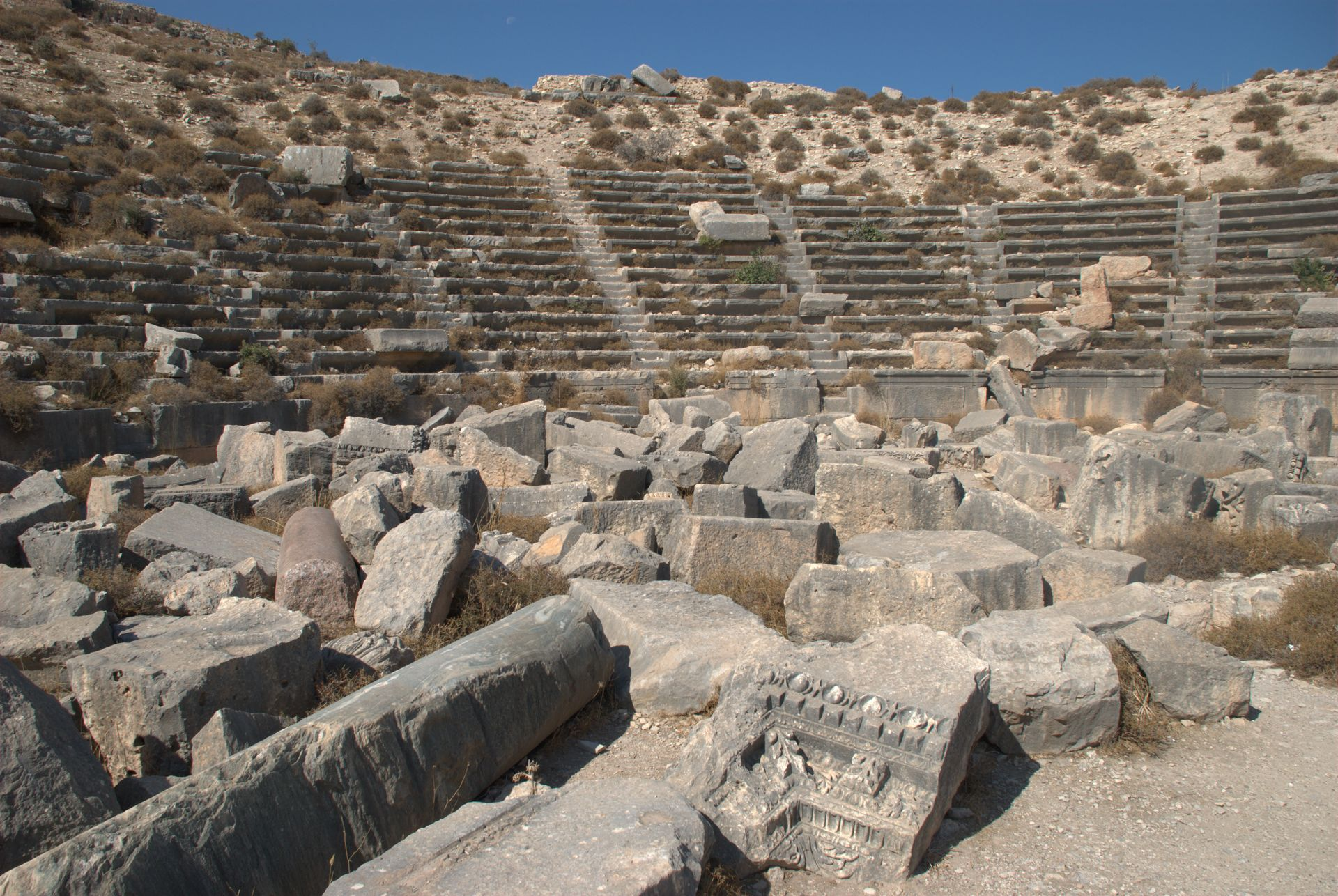
The well-preserved Roman amphitheatre is among the largest in Syria.

The city has been excavated by the Lebanese Syrian Archaeological Mission of Cyrrhus. Initial results indicate a square layout with Hippodamian grid road plan and a central main road with Colonnades typical of the Hellenistic east . The road layout seems to have survived until into the Islamic times. Remains in Cyrrhus include two Roman Bridge s in working order, a dilapidated theatre outside the town and foundations of a Basilica church and some city fortifications. In the 6th century a Byzantine citadel was built on the top of the hill behind the theatre. with evidence of Greek and Egyptian influences in the design work. This citadel is still largely unexcavated. The exact date of the city's construction is unknown, as it is attributed to the period of the reign of Seleucus Nicator (312 - 280) BC. Given the importance of the city's location, large military forces were stationed there whose subordination to a city is unknown, and perhaps it was independent of itself. Coins were minted during this period and it was also an important center for the worship of the two gods, Athena, the protector of the great land, and Zeus (the god of the thunderbolt). It is believed that the Temple of Zeus stood on top of the mountain next to the city. Syros became a frontier city after the separation of Asia Minor from the Seleucid state, following the Treaty of Apamea in 188 BC, which lost its civilian importance and became a center for assembling armies and securing the strong soldiers of the kings of Antioch. In the year 83 BC, controlled by the king of Armenia, Tigran the Great, chaos spread in its area, until the Romans recaptured it in the year 69 BC.

== Ecclesiastical history ==
Cyrrhus became a Christian bishopric at an early date, a suffragan of Hierapolis Bambyce, capital and metropolitan see of the Roman province of Euphratensis. Under Justinian, it became an autocephalous ecclesiastical metropolis subject directly to the Patriarch of Antioch but without suffragans. Its bishop Syricius was present at the First Council of Nicaea in 325. The Arian Abgar (Latinized as Abgarus or Augarus) was at the Council of Seleucia (360). Theodoret mentions as another Arian a bishop called Asterius of the time of the Roman Emperor Valens (364–378). Isidorus attended the First Council of Constantinople in 381. The most celebrated of the bishops of Cyrrhus is Theodoret himself (423-458), a prolific writer, well known for his rôle in the history of Nestorianism, Eutychianism, and Marcionism. He tells us that his small diocese (about forty miles square) contained 800 churches, which supposes a very dense population. In 476, a bishop named Ioannes held a synod against Peter the Fuller. At the close of that century the bishop was a Nestorian named Sergius, who was replaced by another of the same name who was of the directly opposite theological opinion, being a Jacobite, and was deposed by Emperor Justin I in 518. Michael the Syrian lists 13 other Jacobite bishops of the see.

A magnificent basilica held the relics of Saints Cosmas and Damian, who had suffered martyrdom in the vicinity about 283, and whose bodies had been transported to the city, whence it was also called Hagioupolis. Many holy personages, moreover, chiefly hermits, had been or were then living in this territory, among them Saints Acepsimas, Zeumatius, Zebinas, Polychronius, Maron (the patron of the Maronite Church), Eusebius, Thalassius, Maris, James the Wonder-worker, and others. Bishop Theodoret devoted an entire work to the illustration of their virtues and miracles.

=== Residential (Arch)Bishops of Cyrrhus ===
Name	Dates	Churchmanship	Notes	Picture
Syricius	325		at First Council of Nicaea	
Abgar	360	Arian	at Council of Seleucia (360)	
Asterius	364–378	Arian		
Isidorus	381		at First Council of Constantinople	
Theodoret of Cyrrhus	423-458			
Ioannes	476		held a synod against Peter the Fuller	
Sergius I of Cyrrhus	late 5th century	Nestorian	was deposed by Byzantine Emperor Justin I	
Sergius II of Cyrrhus.	518	Jacobite	exiled about AD 522.	
John of Cyrrhus	c628	Orthodox???		
12 Jacobite Bishops				
John of Cyrrhus				

The city was taken in the early 11th century by the Crusaders who made new Bishopric, dependent on Edessa under the name Coricié.

=== Titular sees ===
No longer a residential bishopric, Cyrrhus is today listed by the Catholic Church as a titular see, in two different rite-specific traditions, in the apostolic succession of the Byzantine archdiocese.

=== Bishops of Crusader Coricié ===
==== Latin titular see ====
Established no later then as Titular archbishopric of Cyrrhus (Latin) / Cirro (Curiate Italian) / Cyrrhen(sis) (Latin adjective), alias Cyrrhus of the Latins

It has been vacant for decades, having had the following incumbents, of the fitting Archepiscopal rank with an Episcopal (lowest) exception:

- Carolus Polodig (1713.12.23 – death 1714.07.07), no actual prelature
- Titular Bishop: John Wallace (1720.04.30 – death 1733.06.30) (born Scotland, UK), Coadjutor Apostolic Vicar of Scotland (Scotland) (1720.04.30 – 1727.07.23), Coadjutor Apostolic Vicar of Lowland District of Scotland (Scotland) (1727.07.23 – 1733.06.30)
- Ignazio Nasalli-Ratti (Italian), (1819.12.17 – 1827.06.25), later Cardinal-Priest of Sant'Agnese fuori le mura (1827.09.17 – death 1831.12.02)
- Luca de Cigalla (1832.07.27 – 1847.02.12), first while Bishop of Santorini (insular Greece) (1828.12.15 – 1847.02.12 ?not possessed), then as Coadjutor Apostolic Vicar of Constantinopole (Ottoman Turkey) (1832.07.27 – 1847.02.12 not possessed)
- Loudovico of St. Teresa Martini (1845.09.30 – death 1883.07.12) while Apostolic Vicar of Verapoly (British India) (1844.12.07 – 1855.11.10) and as emeritus; previously Titular Bishop of Europus (1839.06.07 – 1845.09.30) as Coadjutor Vicar Apostolic of Verapoly (1839.06.07 – succession 1844.12.07)
- Nikolaus Adames (1883.11.02 – death 1887.02.13) as emeritus: previously Titular Bishop of Halicarnassus (1863.03.27 – 1870.09.27 as Pro-Vicar Apostolic of Luxembourg (native Luxembourg) (1848.05.07 – 1863.03.27) and (promoted) last Vicar Apostolic of Luxembourg (Luxembourg) (1863.03.27 – 1870.09.27); next (see promoted) first Bishop of Luxembourg (1870.09.27 – retired 1883.09.27)
- Louis-André Navarre (born France) (1888.08.17 – death 1912.01.17) first as Apostolic Vicar of Melanesia (insular Papua New Guinea) (1887.05.17 – 1889.05.10), then as Apostolic Vicar of New Guinea (mainland Papua New Guinea) (1889.05.10 – 1908.01) and as emeritus; previously Titular Bishop of Pentacomia (1887.05.17 – 1888.08.17)
- Ludovít Szmrecsányi (1912.03.26 – 1912.08.20) (born Slovakia) as Coadjutor Archbishop of Archdiocese of Eger (Hungary) (1912.03.26 – succession 1912.08.20); previously Titular Bishop of Magyddus (1904.11.14 – 1912.03.26) without actual prelature; later Metropolitan Archbishop of above Eger (1912.08.20 –death 1943.01.28)

BIOs to ELABORATE

- Joaquim José Vieira (1912.11.08 – 1917.07.08)
- Vilmos Batthyány (1920.12.16 – 1923.11.24)
- Serafino Cimino (1924.12.18 – 1928.05.04)
- Gennaro Cosenza (1930.01.02 – 1930.03.20)
- Archbishop-elect Giuseppe Pizzardo (1930.03.28 – 1930.04.22) (later Cardinal)
- Ferdinando Fiandaca (1930.08.01 – 1941.02.18)
- Juan José Aníbal Mena Porta (1941.06.14 – 1949.02.25)
- Silvestro Patrizio Mulligan (1950.08.16 – 1950.10.23)
- Eris Norman Michael O'Brien (1951.01.11 – 1953.11.16)
- Guilford Clyde Young (1954.10.10 – 1955.09.20)
- Louis Ferrand (1956.04.17 – 1956.10.28)
- Mário de Miranda Villas-Boas (1956.10.23 – 1959.06.20)
- José Rafael Pulido Méndez (1961.01.16 – 1966.11.22)

==== Maronite titular see ====
No later than 1896 was established the Antiochene rite Titular archbishopric of Cyrrhus / Cirro (Curiate Italian) / Cyrrhen(sis) Maronitarum (Latin adjective), alias Cyrrhus of the Maronites.

In 1956 it was suppressed, having had only these incumbents, both of the fitting Archiepiscopal (intermediate) rank and without actual prelature :

- Joseph Estefan (1896.09.24 – death 1915.07.04)
- Elia Scedid (1926.06.21 – death 1950.01.18) (born Lebanon).

== Gallery ==
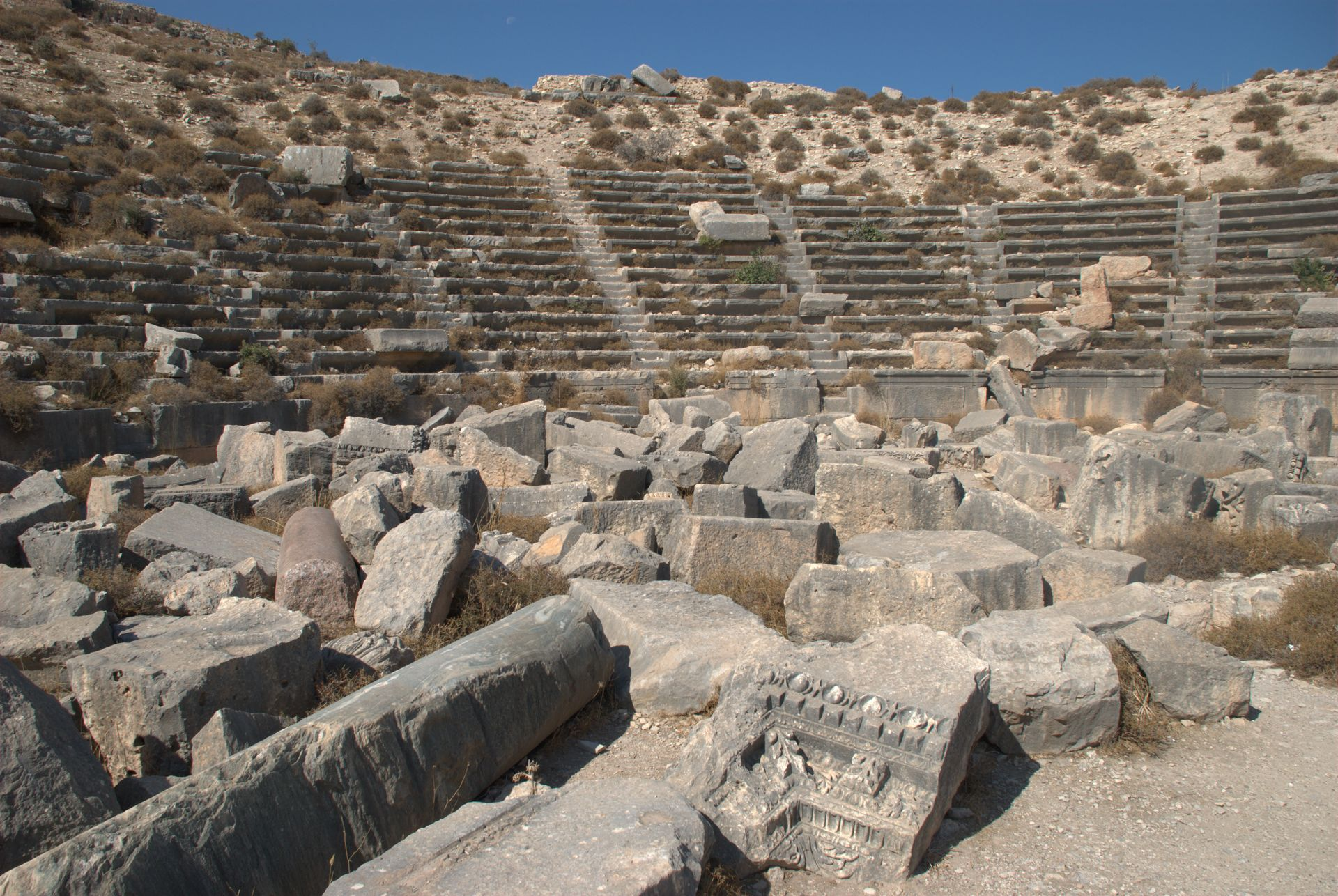
Roman-era theater building

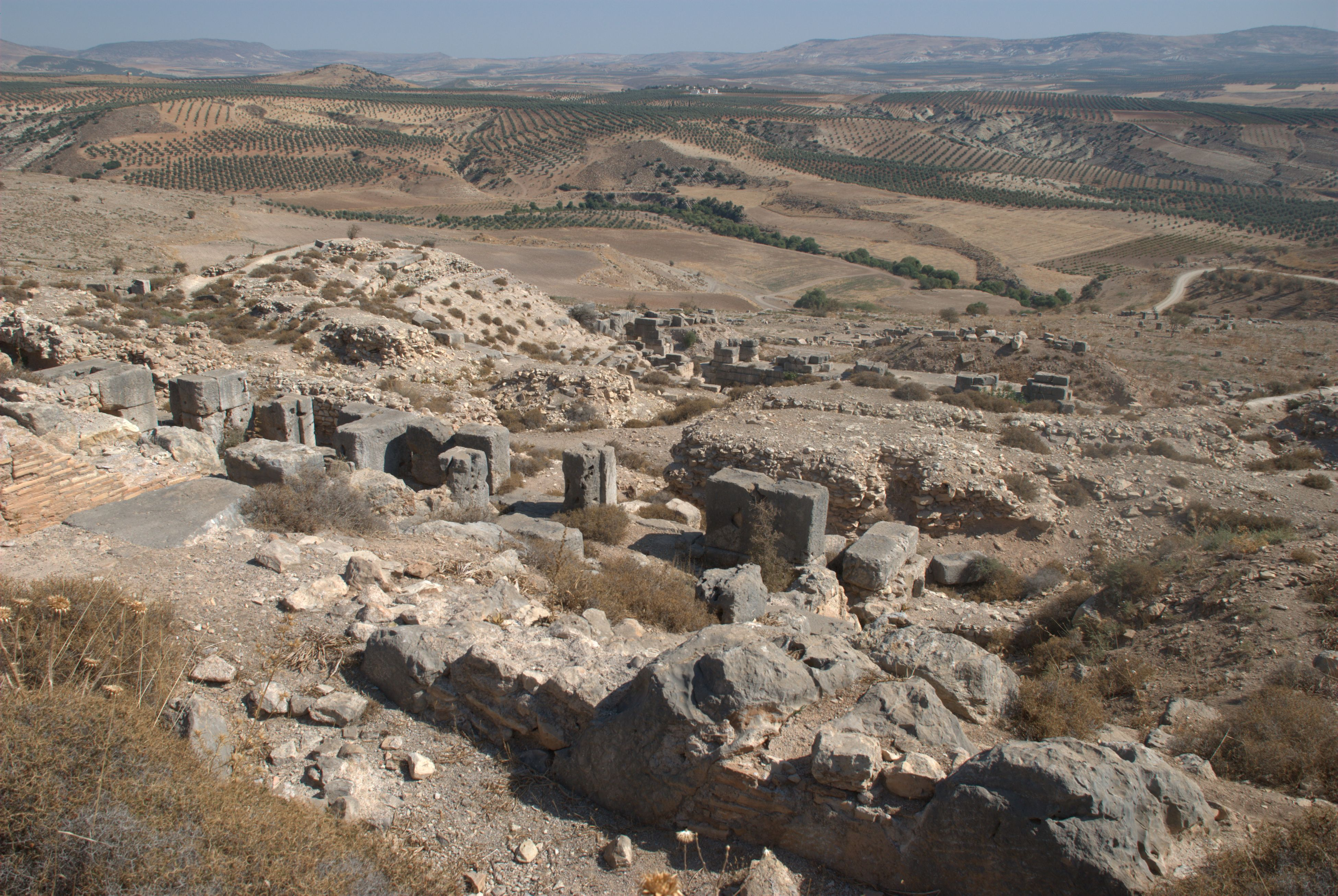
Ruins of North Cyrrhus

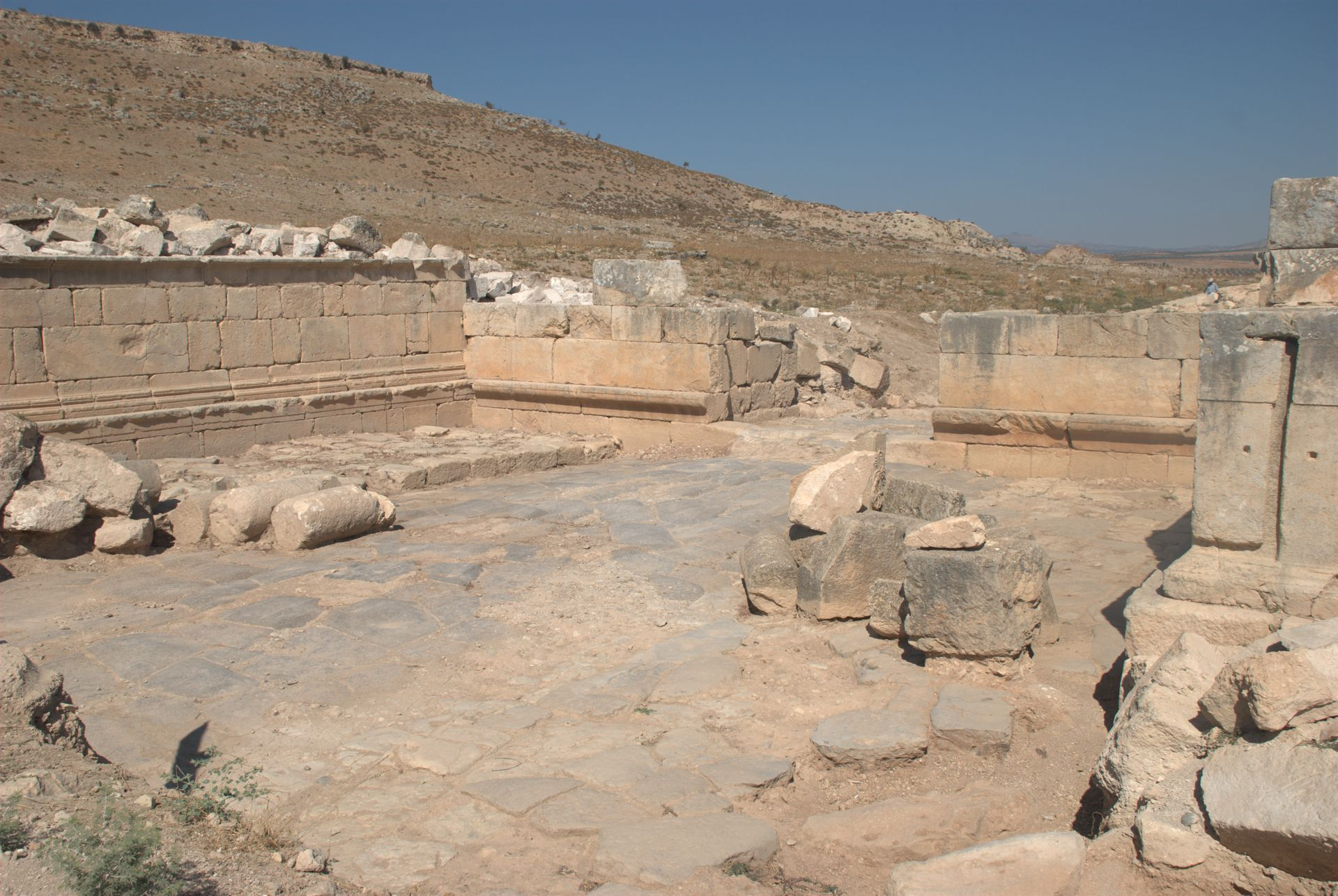
Ruins of the southern gate of Cyrrhus

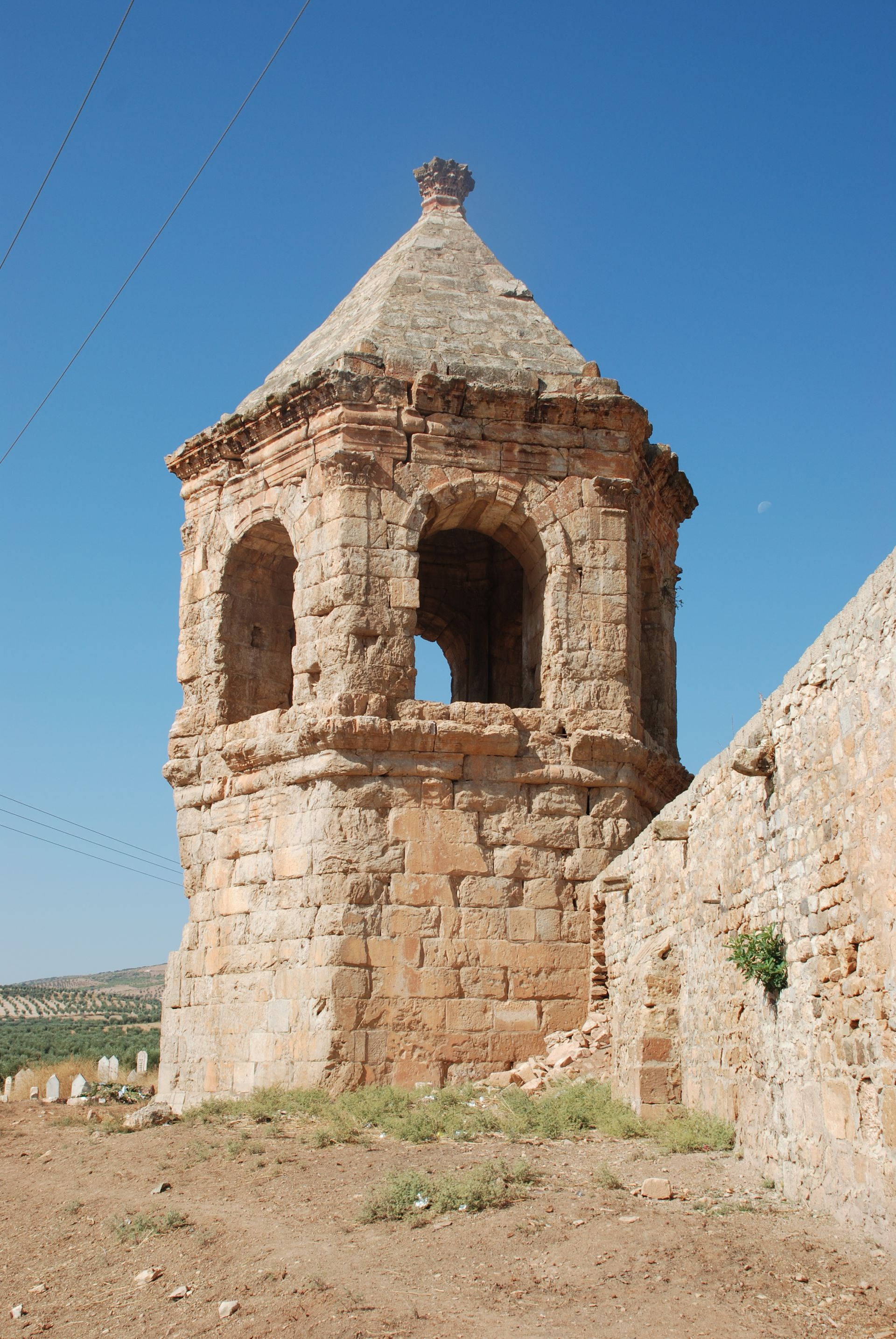
The Roman-era hexagonal tower tomb, now part of the Mosque of Prophet Huri

== Sources and external links ==
- GCatholic - Latin titular see
- GCatholic - Maronite titular see
- Archeological excavations at Cyrrhus/Nebi Houri
- Cyrrhus at livius.org
- Cyrrhus/Nabi Huri at cometosyria.com
- Runciman, Steven (1962). A History of the Crusades, Volume II: The Kingdom of Jerusalem and the Frankish East, 1100-1187. Cambridge University Press. ISBN 0-521-06162-8.
