= Keith J. Chylinski =

American prelate

His Excellency, The Most Reverend Keith James Chylinski
- Auxiliary Bishop of Philadelphia; Titular Bishop of Gunela
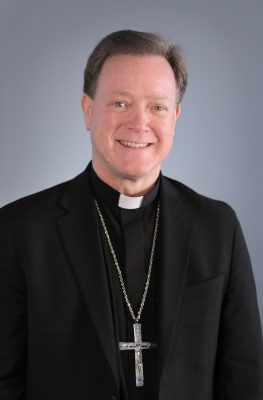
- Archdiocese: Philadelphia
- Appointed: December 8, 2023
- Installed: March 7, 2024
- Other post: Titular Bishop of Gunela

Orders
- Ordination: May 19, 2007 by Justin Rigali
- Consecration: March 7, 2024 by Nelson J. Pérez, John J. McIntyre, and Michael Francis Burbidge

Personal details
- Born: July 23, 1971 (age 54) Schenectady, New York, US
- Education: Temple University; St. Charles Borromeo Seminary; Divine Mercy University
- Motto: Dabo vobis cor novum (I will give you a new heart)

Styles of Keith James Chylinski
- Reference style: His Excellency; The Most Reverend
- Spoken style: Your Excellency
- Religious style: Bishop

Keith James Chylinski (born July 23, 1971) is an American Catholic prelate who has been serving as an auxiliary bishop for the Archdiocese of Philadelphia in Pennsylvania since 2024.

== Biography ==
=== Early life ===
Keith J. Chylinski was born on July 23, 1971, to Edmund and Kelly Chylinski. A native of Schenectady, New York, he attended West Woods Elementary and Hamden Middle School in Hamden, Connecticut, and then Conestoga High School in Berwyn, Pennsylvania. After graduating from high school, Chylinski entered Temple University in Philadelphia, where he received a Bachelor of Music degree.

After several years working in parish music ministry, Chylinski entered St. Charles Borromeo Seminary in Wynnewood, Pennsylvania. He was awarded a Master of Divinity degree from St. Charles in 2006 and a Master of Arts degree in 2007.

=== Priesthood ===
Chylinski was ordained to the priesthood for the Archdiocese of Philadelphia by Cardinal Justin Rigali on May 19, 2007, at the Cathedral Basilica of Saints Peter and Paul. After his ordination, the archdiocese assigned Chylinski as parochial vicar at the following parishes:

- Saint Anselm in Philadelphia (2007 to 2011)
- Mary Mother of the Redeemer in North Wales (2011 to 2012)

In 2012, Chylinski was sent for studies at the Institute for the Psychological Sciences, receiving a Master of Science degree in Clinical Psychology in 2014. On his return to Philadelphia, he was appointed to the faculty of St. Charles Borromeo Seminary. During this time, he performed weekend pastoral service first at Saint Joseph Parish in Downingtown, Pennsylvania, then at Saint Alphonsus Parish in Maple Glen, Pennsylvania. In 2022, Chylinski was named rector of the seminary, and oversaw the historic move to its new campus in Lower Gwynedd in 2024.

Chylinski has also served on the archdiocesan council of priests, was a member of the Archbishop's Commission on Racial Healing, and was the national chaplain of the Catholic Psychotherapy Association.

=== Auxiliary Bishop of Philadelphia ===
On December 8, 2023, Pope Francis appointed Chylinski as an auxiliary bishop for the Archdiocese of Philadelphia and titular bishop of Gunela. He was consecrated on March 7, 2024 at the Cathedral Basilica of Saints Peter and Paul by Archbishop Nelson J. Pérez, with Auxiliary Bishop John J. McIntyre and Bishop Michael Burbidge as co-consecrators. He currently serves as Episcopal Vicar for Catholic Education within the Archdiocese.

== See also ==
- Catholic Church hierarchy
- Catholic Church in the United States
- Historical list of the Catholic bishops of the United States
- List of Catholic bishops of the United States
- Lists of patriarchs, archbishops, and bishops

== Episcopal succession ==
Catholic Church titles
Preceded by –	Auxiliary Bishop of Philadelphia; 2024–present	Succeeded by –
