= Lycée Victor Hugo (Marrakesh) =

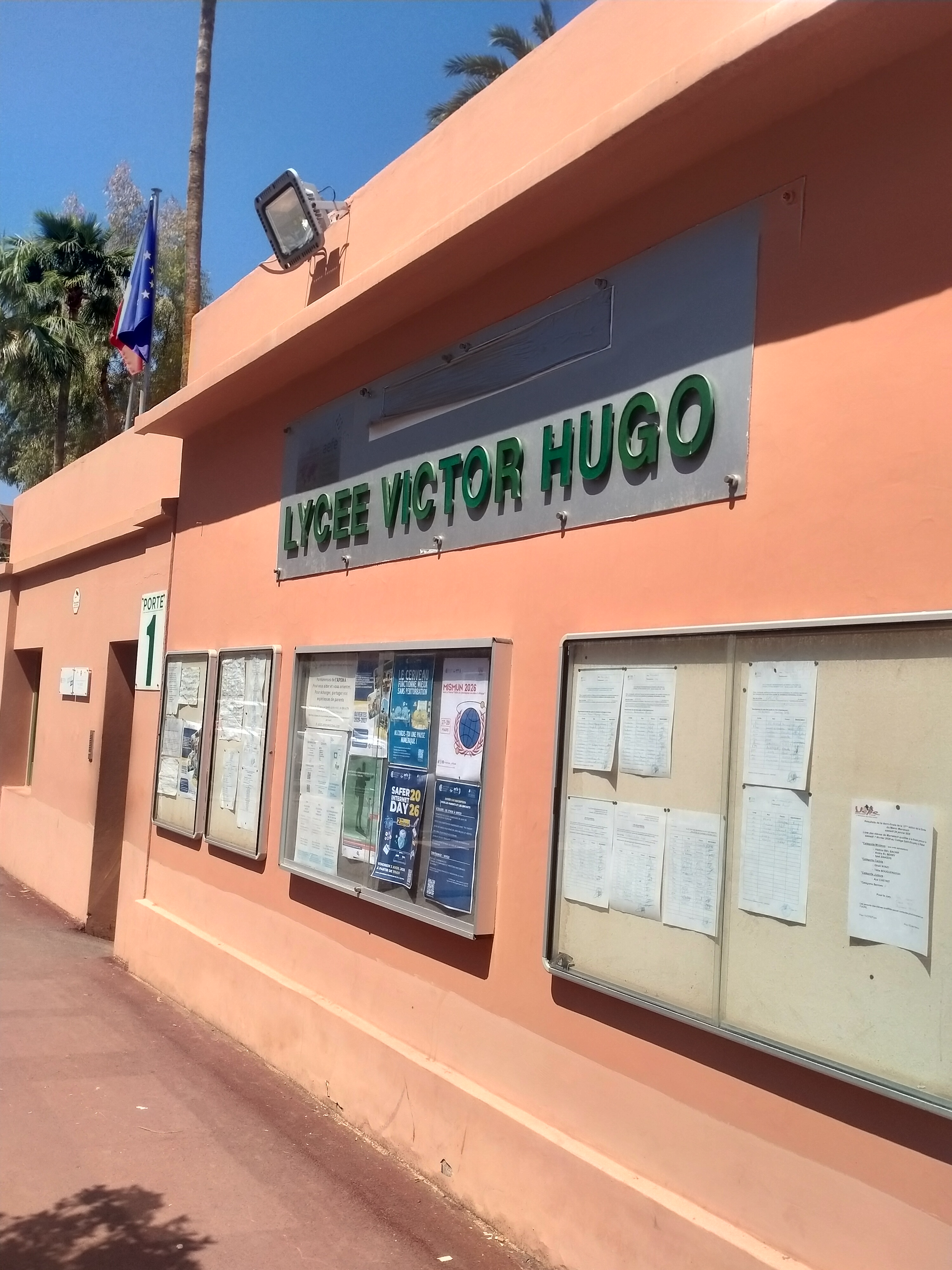
- Marrakesh; Morocco

Information
- School type: International School
- Grades: Petite Section - Cours Moyen 2; (École Auguste Renoir); Sixième - Terminale; (Lycée Victor Hugo)
- Age: 3 to 18
- Enrollment: 850 (École Auguste Renoir); 1200 (Lycée Victor Hugo)
- Language: French
- Website: www.citescolairehugorenoir.org

Lycée Victor Hugo is a French international school in Marrakesh, Morocco. It is named after Victor Hugo and serves levels collège (middle school) and lycée (sixth form college/senior high school).

It is directly operated by the Agency for French Education Abroad (AEFE), an agency of the French government.

The school was founded in the 1960s in the former quartier Lamy, a part of a French military assembly area, after the previously established primary and secondary schools were given to the Moroccan government.

It is a part of the Cité Scolaire Hugo-Renoir, which also houses the primary school École Auguste Renoir. Founded in its current form in 1962 within the French cultural mission in Morocco. In 2022, the school welcomes about 2050 students (schoolchildren, middle school and high school students). The Auguste-Renoir primary school, which is attached to it as part of a school complex, has some 800 students.
