= Bilateral relations between Mexico and the Holy See (1821–1855) =

Relations between Mexico and the Holy See were interrupted following Independence. The Holy See recognized the new country in 1836. Mexico had two problems in relation to the Roman Catholic Church; one was royal patronage and the other was the appointment of bishops.

== Royal patronage ==
Royal patronage was granted on 16 November 1501. Pope Alexander VI granted to the Catholic monarchs of Spain the tithes from all colonies, conditional on the Kings being responsible for the evangelization of Indians, and funding and building churches.

Meanwhile Pope Julius II, by a privilege issued in 1508, granted Ferdinand the exclusive right of real control over the foundation and construction of all churches, monasteries and hospitals on American soil. Besides the king would appoint the ecclesiastical dignities (archbishops, bishop, etc.) and could change the bishoprics where considered appropriate. The Board is the sum of privileges granted some loads the Church Catholic church planters. The privileges consist of the right to choose clergy to the Church and have a special immunity and ecclesiastical jurisdiction. In return the board of trustees should keep the clergy, facilitate and build hospitals, churches and welfare centers. In order to maintain the clergy, the Holy See granted the Crown's tithe income. The Spanish crown used its power conferred on the Board to preserve their dominance. That took control in the management of revenues, in religious matters and the election of bishops were factors that allowed that goal.

== Plan of Iguala ==
The Plan of Iguala contained three main items: the independence of Mexico under moderate and constitutional monarchy, the Catholic religion as state religion and the creation of Trigarante Army, which was to protect and carry out the plan.

== The end of the patronage ==
After reaching the Independence of Mexico and guaranteed the privileges of the clergy by the Treaty of Córdoba, the bishops of Mexico felt that it was time to end the patronage linking the Mexican Church with the Spanish Crown. In independent Mexico there were two positions facing the problem of patronage. One, the high clergy and their supporters, was based on an interpretation which held that the trustees had not been awarded to the Spanish nation; but it had been granted to the kings of Castile by the Holy See, so that Mexico could exercise the patronage a concordat with the Holy See was needed. In contrast there was another trend, inspired by the royalist doctrine of the eighteenth century, who played the issue of patronage as a prerogative that the Holy See had granted to the Spanish nation and not the person of the king. Therefore, having broken ties with Spain, that prerogative was in the Mexican state without requesting authorization from the pope. In February 1822, the Regency headed by Agustin de Iturbide, Antonio Joaquin Perez Martinez, bishop of Puebla; and Manuel de la Barcena, convened a diocesan board to solve various ecclesiastical problems. its first meeting, which decided that for the Mexican government to exercise that privilege, it would have to be obtained directly from the Holy See took place in March of that year. However, the Holy See did not recognize another authority other than the king; the Holy See gave the benefit, since it would recognize the independence of Mexico. The board also agreed that until there was an agreement between the Holy See and the Mexican government, the patronage passed to the bishops. Diocesan, therefore, would appoint priests to fill the vacancies benefits. It was agreed that the civil power could exclude priests who for political reasons not to their liking. The diocesan board resolutions were accepted by the Regency and later by the rule of Iturbide.

To the fall of the Empire, the controversy continued. In 1833 Valentin Gomez Farias joined the State in fact the properties belonging to said Royal Patronage. Until 1855 it is considered patronage of fact; the Mexican government could intervene in the nomination of bishops, presenting a list of selected state priests. However, Mexico has had 38 governments at that stage, that possibility became impracticable.

== The clergy after the independence of Mexico ==
The second problem was that Mexico being a Catholic country, stated in the Federal Constitution of 1824, achieved the Holy See to appoint bishops, since there were not enough bishops, for 1827, the church had a single bishop, Puebla.

In 1831 the Councils, which had 181 total perquisites, had vacancies 93. The secular clergy had fallen numerically in 1810 there were 2,282 priests. However, in the War of Independence, they died more than 200, about 300 they went to Spain, others died, the lack of vocations and difficulty ordination did the rest. The regular clergy also decreased. Of the 208 convents had after the war of Independence, there were only 155 and about 1,700 friars of all orders. In this situation, Pedro Pablo Vazquez, in his negotiations with Rome, focused its efforts on request that the Pope appointed bishops for vacant sees property, leaving aside the problem of the board; He is arguing that it was only a spiritual matter.

== The appointment of bishops ==
In 1831, after lengthy negotiations, Gregory XVI stronger than their predecessors, Leo XII and Pius VIII, and supported by its unconditional Secretary of State, Cardinal Luigi Lambruschini, appointed six bishops, including Pedro Pablo Vazquez dioceses were restored and seminars for 1851 increased the number of priests to 3,232. With that decision, first to the Mexican diocese bishops were appointed; without requiring permission from the Spanish Crown. Among those who participated in the process were: Pedro Pablo Vazquez, Pope Gregory XVI and Ignacio Valdivieso.

=== Francisco Pablo Vázquez ===
Francisco Pablo Vázquez, Canon of Puebla, from 1830 to 1832 carried out a diplomatic mission to the Holy See; consistó mission that the Holy See to appoint bishops to Mexico. There were difficulties by the refusal of the Spanish government; even all the arrangements that the Holy See tried to mediate between Mexico and Spain failed. In the first instance the Holy See proposed Vazquez appoint bishops in partibus infidelium; but this proposition seemed to poblano priest an offense to Mexico, since it lowered to an evangelized people and held the status of holders bishops (title that was given in the sixteenth century), and this did not fit the Mexican reality of the time. Finally with the help of Pope Gregory XVI was consecrated in Rome as bishop of Puebla in March 1831. Vazquez acted as de facto head of the Mexican episcopate until the consecration of Manuel Posada y Garduño as metropolitan archbishop of Mexico City in April 1840.

=== Gregory XVI ===
Pope Gregory XVI (pontiff from 1831 to 1846), also named as the new Columbus of America, said that the Church is universal and should not be partial in political effects. Thus, he acted quickly and Feb. 28, 1831, with just twenty days of his pontificate, he advocated six Mexican priests to occupy the headquarters of Puebla, Monterrey, Durango, Michoacán, Chiapas and Guadalajara.

=== Ignacio Valdivieso ===
Ignacio Valdivieso was an important representative of Mexico to the Holy See; it was he who accompanied Pope Pius IX in his exile in the fortress of Gaeta in 1849.

== Spain ==
Before independence, Spain tried to regain New Spain, Fernando VII so pressured by the ambassadors in Rome to the Popes (Pius VII, Leo XII and Pius VIII); this pressure aimed Mexican Catholics faithful to realize that the independence of Mexico brought as a consequence that the Pontificate not appoint bishops holders for the country. Spain refused to recognize the independence of Mexico and demanded to continue naming the holders of ecclesiastical offices. Pius VIII (1829-1830), in his brief pontificate of eight months would not offend Fernando VII and refrained from naming residential bishops, showing that he did not recognize the independence of Mexico.

== The Holy See recognizes Mexico Independent ==
In November 1836, relations between the Holy See and the Mexican government were fully established. In July 1835 Spain had broken relations with the Holy See. The triangular period (Spain-Vatican-Mexico) had broken.

In 1849, Jose Joaquin Herrera offered Mexico as a land of exile for exiled Pope Pius IX. Pope welcomed the offer of the president and the Mexican Congress but declined. (In 1851, the Holy See appointed Archbishop Luigi Clementi as the first apostolic delegate in Mexico, whose mission culminated in 1861. 'When Gregory XVI recognized the Independence of Mexico received as extraordinary and plenipotentiary minister Manuel Diez de Bonilla. In exchange, Pius IX appointed Luigi Clementi, who arrived in Mexico in 1851.

== Reform laws ==
The Law on Administration of Justice and Organic Law of the Courts of the Nation District and Territories known as the Juarez Law of 22 November 1855, abolished the special courts that had certain corporations dating back to the Colonia was dictated by President Juan Alvarez and produced by Benito Juarez, who was minister of justice. It is considered the first of the reform laws. It was followed by the Law on Confiscation of Ruins and Urban of Civil and Religious Corporations Mexico, known as the lerdo law (1856) the Civil Registration Act (1857), the Law on Nationalization of Goods Ecclesiastical and Religious Freedom (1859-1860) and the Constitution of 1857 triggered the civil war, called the war of Reform or three years in which the role of the clergy and the relations between the church and state were settled.

== See also ==
- Holy See–Mexico relations
