= Gunela =

Ancient Roman-Berber town and archaeological site

Africa Proconsularis (125 AD)

Gunela was an ancient Roman-Berber town and archaeological site in Bizerte Governorate, Tunisia. It was located at 37.165524°N 9.765536°E, within the modern suburbs of Tinja, Tunisia.

In antiquity, Gunela was a town in the province of Africa Proconsularis. Gunela has been tentatively located at the ruins of Henchir-Goungla across the river from Tindja. The town flourished from 30 BC to AD 640.

During late antiquity, Gunela was the seat of an ancient Roman Catholic diocese, suffragan of the Archdiocese of Carthage. The only bishop recorded by history is Pascasio, who took part in the Council of Carthage (484) that was convened by the Vandal king Huneric, after which Pascasio was exiled. Today it survives as titular bishopric and the current bishop is Keith Chylinski.
