= Achille Silvestrini =

Italian Catholic cardinal (1923–2019)

His Eminence Achille Silvestrini
- Prefect of the Congregation for the Oriental Churches
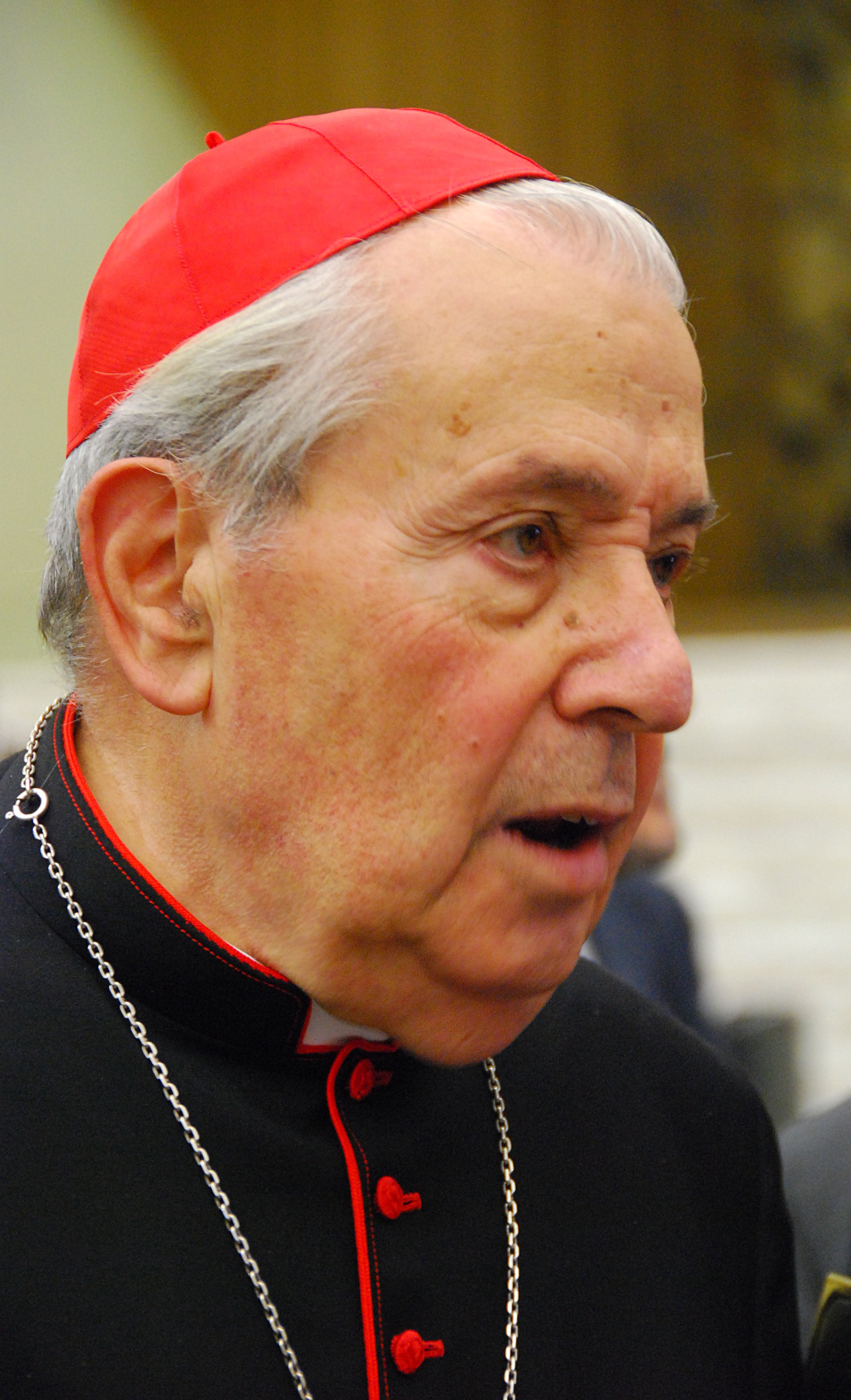
- Silvestrini in November 2006
- See: Novaliciana (titular)
- Appointed: 24 May 1991
- Term ended: 7 September 2000
- Predecessor: Duraisamy Simon Lourdusamy
- Successor: Ignatius Moses I Daoud
- Other post: Cardinal-Priest of San Benedetto fuori Porta San Paolo (1999–2019)
- Previous posts: Undersecretary of the Council for the Public Affairs of the Church (1973–1979); Secretary of the Council for the Public Affairs of the Church (1979–1988); Cardinal Deacon of San Benedetto fuori Porta San Paolo (1988–1999); Prefect of the Supreme Tribunal of the Apostolic Signatura (1988–1991)

Orders
- Ordination: 13 July 1946 by Giuseppe Battaglia
- Consecration: 27 May 1979 by Pope John Paul II
- Created cardinal: 28 June 1988 by Pope John Paul II
- Rank: Cardinal priest

Personal details
- Born: Achille Silvestrini; 25 October 1923 Brisighella, Italy
- Died: 29 August 2019 (aged 95) Vatican City
- Denomination: Roman Catholic
- Education: University of Bologna; Pontifical Lateran University
- Motto: Crux fidelis arbor una nobilis ('Faithful cross, one and only noble tree')

Styles of Achille Silvestrini
- Reference style: His Eminence
- Spoken style: Your Eminence
- Religious style: Cardinal
- Informal style: Cardinal

Achille Silvestrini (25 October 1923 – 29 August 2019) was an Italian cardinal of the Catholic Church. He served in the Vatican diplomatic corps, either in Rome or abroad, from 1953 to 1990, and later as Prefect of the Congregation for the Oriental Churches from 1991 to 2000.

== Early life and ordination ==
Born in Brisighella, Italy, and educated in Rome, Silvestrini was ordained a priest on 13 July 1946 in the cathedral of Faenza by Giuseppe Battaglia, Bishop of Faenza. He earned a doctorate at the University of Bologna in 1948 and a doctorate in canon and civil law at the Pontifical Lateran University.

He began studying at the Pontifical Ecclesiastical Academy in 1952 and joined the Vatican diplomatic service, section of Extraordinary Ecclesiastical Affairs, Secretariat of State, in 1953. He was chargé d'affaires in the Holy See's diplomatic offices in Vietnam, China, Indonesia, and Southeast Asia. In 1955, he worked in the section of Extraordinary Ecclesiastical Affairs, directed by Domenico Tardini.

He served as personal secretary to cardinals Domenico Tardini and Amleto Giovanni Cicognani, as well as in the Council for the Public Affairs of the Church from 1969 to 1979, where he was in charge of the section for international organisations, peace, disarmament, and human rights. He traveled to Moscow with Archbishop Agostino Casaroli, secretary of the council, to deliver the instrument of adhesion of the Holy See to the Treaty on the Non-Proliferation of Nuclear Weapons in 1971.

He headed the Holy See's delegation to the United Nations conference on the peaceful use of nuclear energy in Geneva in 1971 and to the conference on compliance with the Treaty on the Non-Proliferation of Nuclear Weapons in the same city in 1975. He was appointed undersecretary of the Council for the Public Affairs of Church on 28 July 1973.

== Bishop and diplomat ==
Silvestrini was appointed Secretary for Relations with States of the Secretariat of State on 4 May 1979 and assigned the titular see of Novaliciana with the title of archbishop. On 27 May 1979, he was consecrated a bishop by Pope John Paul II.

He worked for the next five years on the revision of the Lateran Treaty on its fiftieth anniversary, and signed a revised treaty that reflected the rapid secularisation of Italy since the 1960s.

He was involved in a number of other concordats between the Vatican and other countries, most notably in the Falklands War of the early 1980s and the war in Nicaragua.

== Cardinal ==
On 28 June 1988, Silvestrini was created cardinal-deacon of the titular church of San Benedetto fuori Porta San Paolo. On 24 May 1991 he was appointed Prefect of the Congregation for the Oriental Churches and, on 3 April 1993, Grand Chancellor of the Pontifical Oriental Institute. He retired from both of those positions on 25 November 2000.

In 1993, he visited film director Federico Fellini on his deathbed and presided at his funeral Mass.

In May 2001, when a consistory of cardinals discussed the role and performance of the Synod of Bishops, Silvestrini was among the critics. He called them "monologues without debate or response".

He was present at the death of Pope John Paul II. In the days before the conclave that elected Pope Benedict XVI, he said the next pope needed to address the relationship between the pope and the world's bishops. He said: "More than divisions, there is a feeling of distance. The bishops feel a little far from what is happening in Rome." He proposed the creation of an elected consultative council of bishops to promote "collegiality" between them and the pope and the Roman Curia.

In 2010, he provided his assessment of the actions during World War II of Pope Pius XII, with whom he worked for many years beginning just after the war. He said:

In that tragic period, [Pius] was concerned about the Germans leaving Rome in peace and respecting its sacred character. It was not a choice against the Jews, because the pope believed that a gesture of protest would have been counter-productive. At the same time, however, he worked to see that as many Jews as possible were sheltered in churches and Catholic institutions.... Pius XII considered what had happened to the Dutch bishops a warning not to do the same. The Dutch episcopacy had written a letter that condemned the "merciless and unjust treatment reserved for the Jews".... The intentions were the best, but the results were disastrous.... It was precisely the country where priests and bishops most vocally denounced the anti-Jewish persecutions that had more deportations than any other nation of Western Europe.

Following the election of Pope Francis in 2013, he said the Catholic Church needs to "start from the Second Vatican Council, from all that has not yet been implemented and must still be accomplished". He called the work of the council and the plans of Pope John XXIII "an unfinished task" and said the church needs "a new language to talk to humanity today, and in particular to the new generations, and to give adequate answers to modernity".

He was chair of the Collegio universitario Fondazione Comunità Domenico Tardini, which was founded in 1946 to support war orphans.

== Papal elections ==
In the 1990s, Silvestrini was mentioned as a successor to Pope John Paul II in the secular press, though Vatican observers, such as Thomas J. Reese, noted that his advanced age made his election unlikely.

Silvestrini was one of about a dozen like-minded cardinals and bishops who met annually from 1995 to 2006 in St. Gallen, Switzerland, to discuss reforms with respect to the appointment of bishops, collegiality, bishops' conferences, the primacy of the papacy and sexual morality; they differed among themselves, but shared the view that Cardinal Joseph Ratzinger was not the sort of candidate they hoped to see elected at the next conclave.

After turning 80 in October 2003, Silvestrini was a principal critic of the rule that only cardinals under the age of 80 can vote in a conclave. He called it "one of the unhappy reforms of Paul VI". Too old to participate in the 2005 conclave to choose the successor of John Paul II, he was nevertheless a vigorous opponent of Ratzinger's election. He told reporters to watch Cardinal Cormac Murphy-O'Connor, Archbishop of Westminster.

== Death ==
Silvestrini died at his home in Vatican City on 29 August 2019, at the age of 95.
