= Santi Simone e Giuda =

Santi Simone e Giuda (Italian, 'St Simon and St Jude') may refer to the following churches in Italy:

- Santi Simone e Giuda, Florence
- Santi Simone e Giuda, Mantua
- Santi Simone e Giuda, Rome, a deconsecrated church
- Santi Simone e Giuda Taddeo a Torre Angela, a modern parish church and a titular church in Rome
- Santi Simone e Giuda, Spoleto
