= Millennium Peace Summit of Religious and Spiritual Leaders =

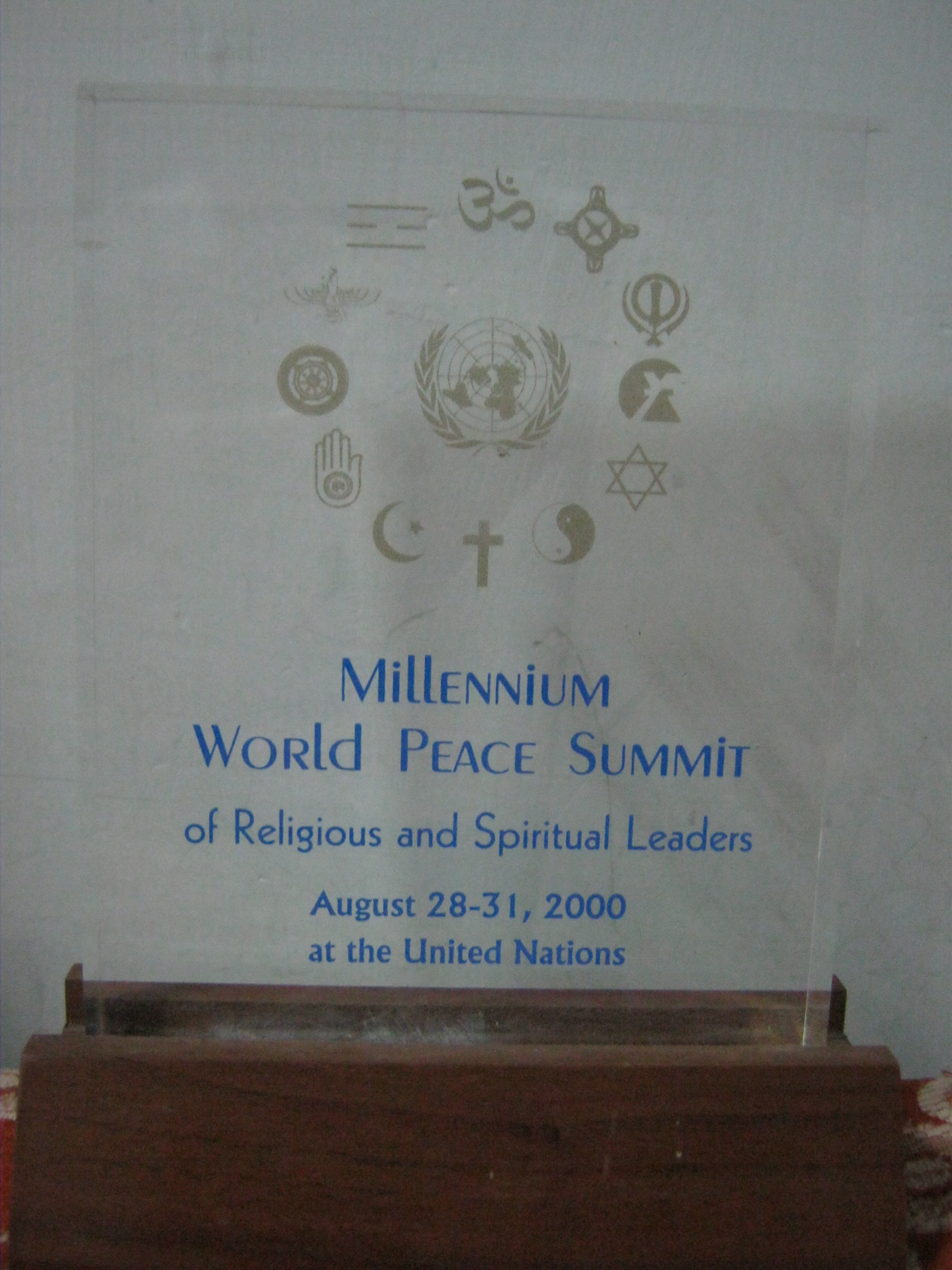
- Host country: United States of America
- Date: August 28–31, 2000
- Cities: New York City
- Venues: United Nations Headquarters & Waldorf Astoria Hotel
- Website: The World Council of Religious Leaders: Millennium World Peace Summit

The Millennium Peace Summit of Religious and Spiritual Leaders was held in New York City between August 28–31, 2000. The meeting recognized the importance of religion to world peace and faith leaders’ commitment to peacekeeping, poverty relief, and environmental conservation. It preceded the Millennium Summit, which commemorated the 50th anniversary of the United Nations (UN).

The Summit consisted of 1.5 days of plenary sessions at the UN Headquarters during which religious and spiritual leaders representing the major faith traditions addressed the entire Summit followed by 2.5 days of meetings and workshops at the Waldorf Astoria Hotel focused on conflict resolution and poverty relief efforts.

The Summit was planned with the support of various organizations, including Harvard Divinity School, the Ford Foundation, and the Turner Foundation. Around 2,000 individuals participated, including 800–1,000 religious leaders representing Buddhism, Christianity, Hinduism, Islam, Judaism, and other traditions. Due to opposition by the Chinese government, the 14th Dalai Lama was not initially invited, leading to international criticism of the event. He was later invited to deliver the closing keynote address but declined.

Summit outcomes included several initiatives such as the Religious Initiative of the World Economic Forum in January 2001, Global Commission for the Preservation of Sacred Sites in November 2001, World Conference of Women Religious and Spiritual Leaders in October 2002, and the UNESCO/UNITWIN Network on Interreligious Dialogue for Intercultural Understanding in 2006.

== History ==
The Summit was envisioned to facilitate interfaith dialogue similar to the Inter-Religious Conference on Peace in New Delhi in 1968 and the Centennial Parliament of the World's Religions in Chicago in 1993. Moreover, from its early years, the UN had also recognized the critical role of religion in conflict resolution and global peace-building, and in 1981, it issued the Declaration on the Elimination of All Forms of Intolerance and Discrimination Based on Religion or Belief. This declaration expanded the basic rights and freedoms described in Article 18 of the Universal Declaration of Human Rights and other relevant provisions, so that nations would take measures against religious intolerance. As growing religious fanaticism began to foster conflicts in places like Indonesia, the Sudan, and Israel-Palestine, the UN sought partnerships with religious faith-based organizations to more effectively promote its peacebuilding mission. All of this, together with UN Secretary General Kofi Annan's commitment to religion's role in contributing to global peace, inspired the organization of a summit at the beginning of the new millennium that would foster interfaith dialogue in hopes of social reform.

== Delegates ==
Secretary-General of the Peace Summit Bawa Jain, UN Under-Secretary-General Maurice Strong, and other UN staff convened 2,000 delegates, including 800–1,000 religious leaders representing Buddhism, Christianity, Hinduism, Islam, Judaism, Jainism, Sikhism, Zoroastrianism, Native American religions, and other traditions from several continents. Dedicated efforts were also made to involve representatives from areas of active conflict, like Ethiopia, Eritrea, and the Balkans. As a gathering of religious and spiritual leaders, it was unprecedented in terms of scale, location, and the focus on peace, protecting the environment, and the fight against poverty.

== The Summit ==
The Millennium Peace Summit was held in New York City between August 28–31, 2000. The Summit was sponsored by and received support from various organizations, including Harvard Divinity School, Ford Foundation, the Turner Foundation as well as other non-governmental organizations (NGOs) and private groups. While the UN was not an official organizer of the event, Kofi Annan, secretary-general of the UN, supported the event.

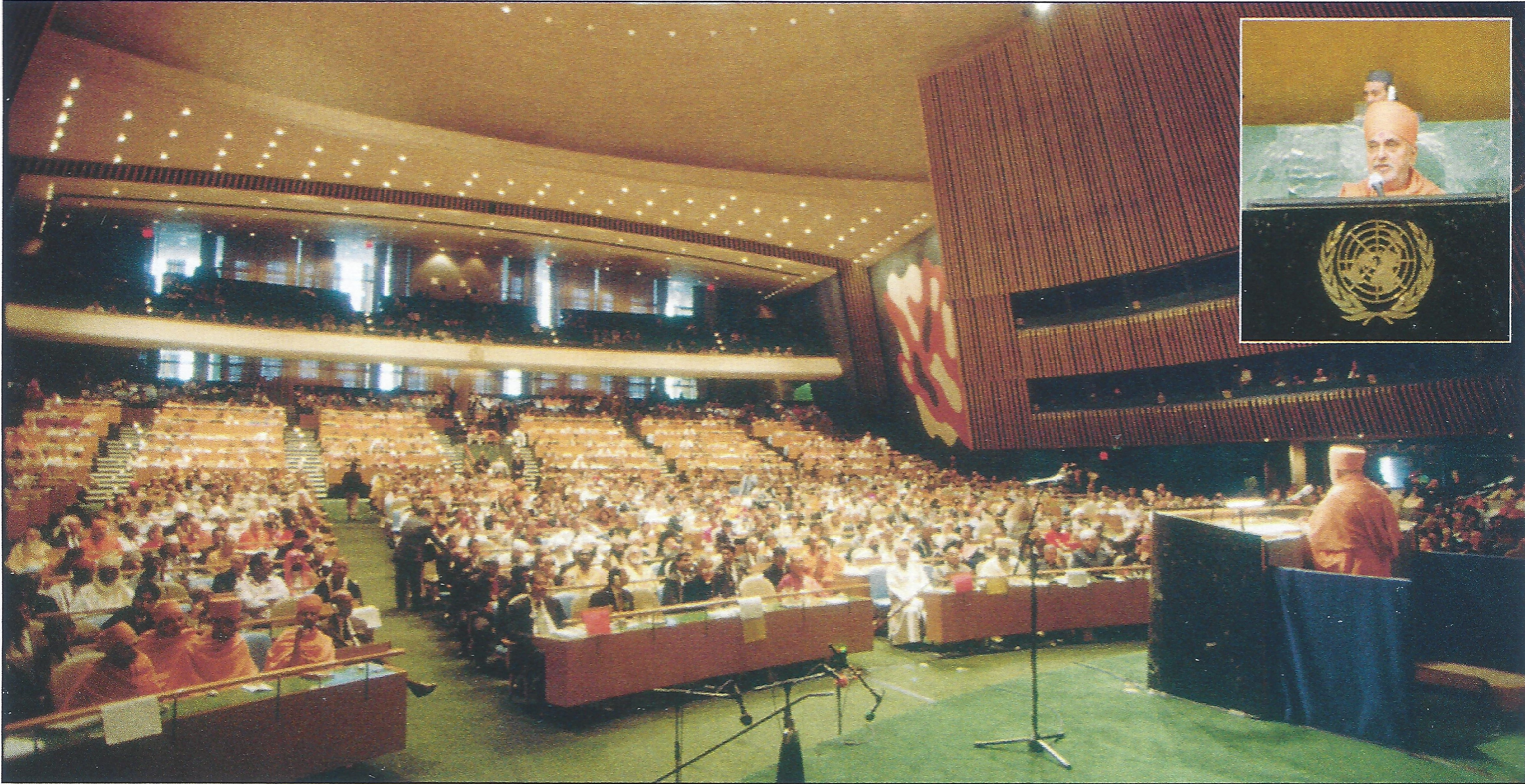
Pramukh Swami Maharaj delivering speech.

The Summit began with 1.5 days of plenary sessions at the UN Headquarters Building. Plenary speakers discussed both historical and modern tensions and the universal desire for reconciliation. Annan addressed the Summit, “Whatever your past, whatever your calling, and whatever the differences among you, your presence here at the United Nations signifies your commitment to our global mission of tolerance, development, and peace.” The primatologist Jane Goodall spoke about the protection of the earth and its animals. American philanthropist Ted Turner reviewed his personal spiritual experiences, “from a small Christian group that believed they alone had access to heaven to his current firm conviction that all faith paths lead ‘to the same mountain top.” Pramukh Swami Maharaj, the spiritual head of the Swaminarayan Hindu denomination BAPS, said that to achieve peace and harmony, in addition to the important dialogue between religious leaders, religious leaders must engage in inner dialogue to assess how well they are aligned with the highest ideals of their founders, as well as dialogue with their followers to promote spiritual values. He stated, “If the followers of every religion become better and true followers, then our world will be a much better world. Therefore, we should steer our followers away from fanaticism and focus on faith and spiritual living.” Rev. Dr. Konrad Raiser of the World Council of Churches said, "Dialogue within and between religions requires not just tolerance but deep respect for the other in his or her authentic relationship with the Holy. True dialogue should enable each partner to deepen his or her own faith or belief, not to weaken or abandon it." Other speakers included Francis Cardinal Arinze of the Vatican, Dr. Abdullah bin Saleh Al Obeid of the Muslim World League, and Yisrael Meir Lau, Chief Rabbi of Israel.

Various meetings were held between August 30–31 at the Waldorf Astoria Hotel addressing conflict resolution and poverty elimination, including workshops run by the World Faiths Development Dialogue from which several themes emerged. First, participants recounted their past successes and insights from working with poor communities. Second, several individuals discussed international social justice issues, like debt, structural adjustment, and cost recovery. Finally, participants with differing viewpoints discussed the role of proselytization in development work.

== Summit Outcomes ==
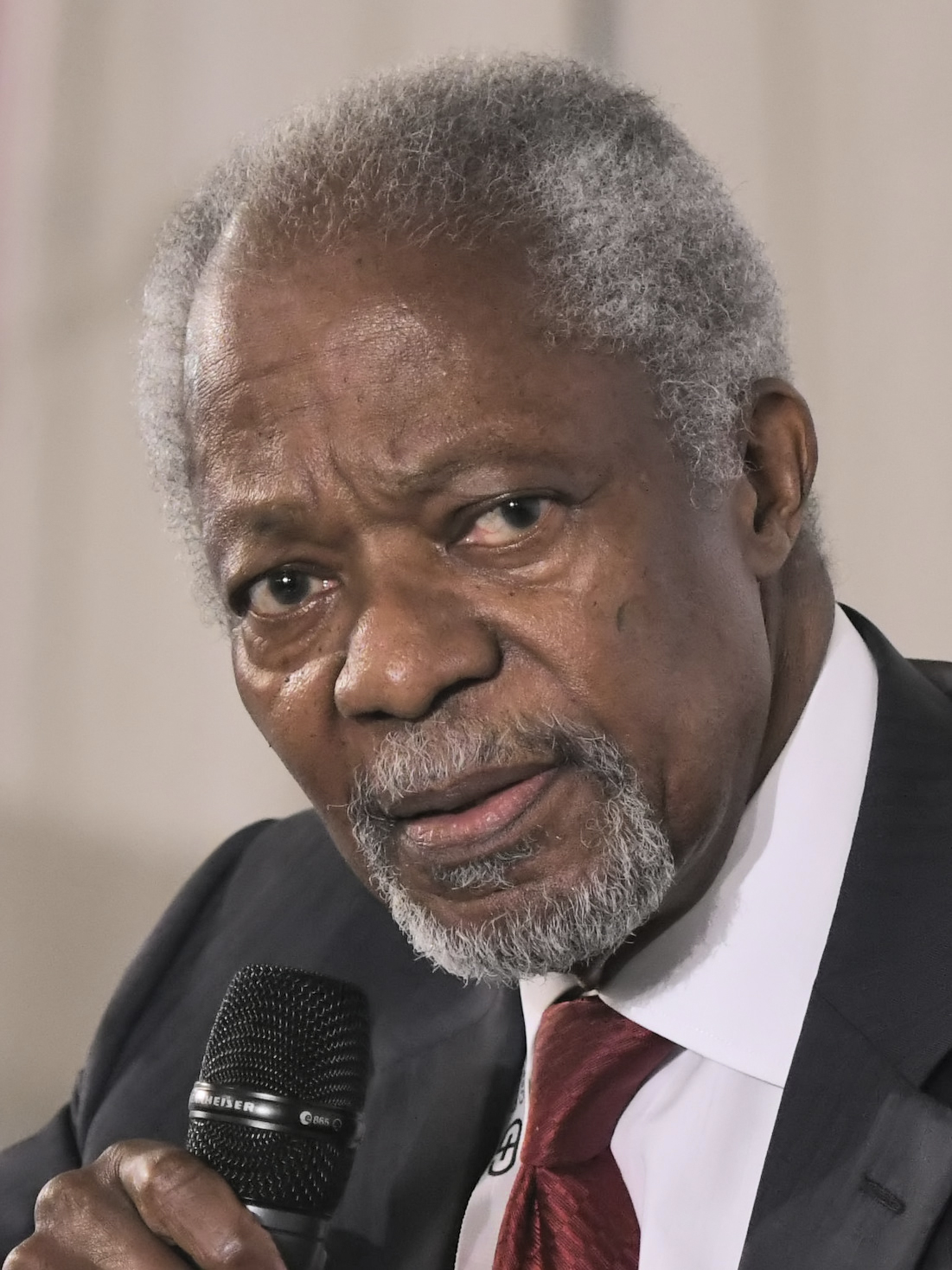
UN Secretary-General Kofi Annan

The Millennium Peace Summit of Religious and Spiritual Leaders preceded the Millennium Summit of heads of state, which commemorated the 50th anniversary of the UN's formation. It communicated global faith leaders’ commitment to peace and fighting poverty and offered specific practical and moral guidance to the world's political leaders. The event emphasized universal values and religion's role in conflict resolution, eradicating poverty, and environmental conservation.

As a culmination of the Summit, participants presented a Commitment to Global Peace to UN Secretary-General Kofi Annan on August 29, 2000, which addressed ways in which religious leaders can facilitate conflict resolution:

- Collaborate with the UN and all people of goodwill in pursuing peace.
- Lead humanity in a renewed commitment to religious and spiritual values, including respect for life and for the dignity of the individual.
- Manage and resolve nonviolently conflicts generated by religious and ethnic differences and condemn violence committed in the name of religion.
- Appeal to all religious communities and ethnic and national groups to respect freedom of religion.
- Awaken in all peoples a sense of shared responsibility for the well-being of the human family and for everyone's right to education, healthcare, and sustainable employment.
- Promote the equitable distribution of wealth among and between nations and seek to eradicate poverty.
- Educate their respective communities about the need to care for the earth's environment.
- Develop and promote reforestation programs.
- Join with the UN in calling on nations to abolish nuclear weapons and other weapons of mass destruction.
- Combat commercial practices that degrade the environment.
- Practice and promote in their various communities the values of inner peace, including love, compassion, tolerance, and a spirit of service.

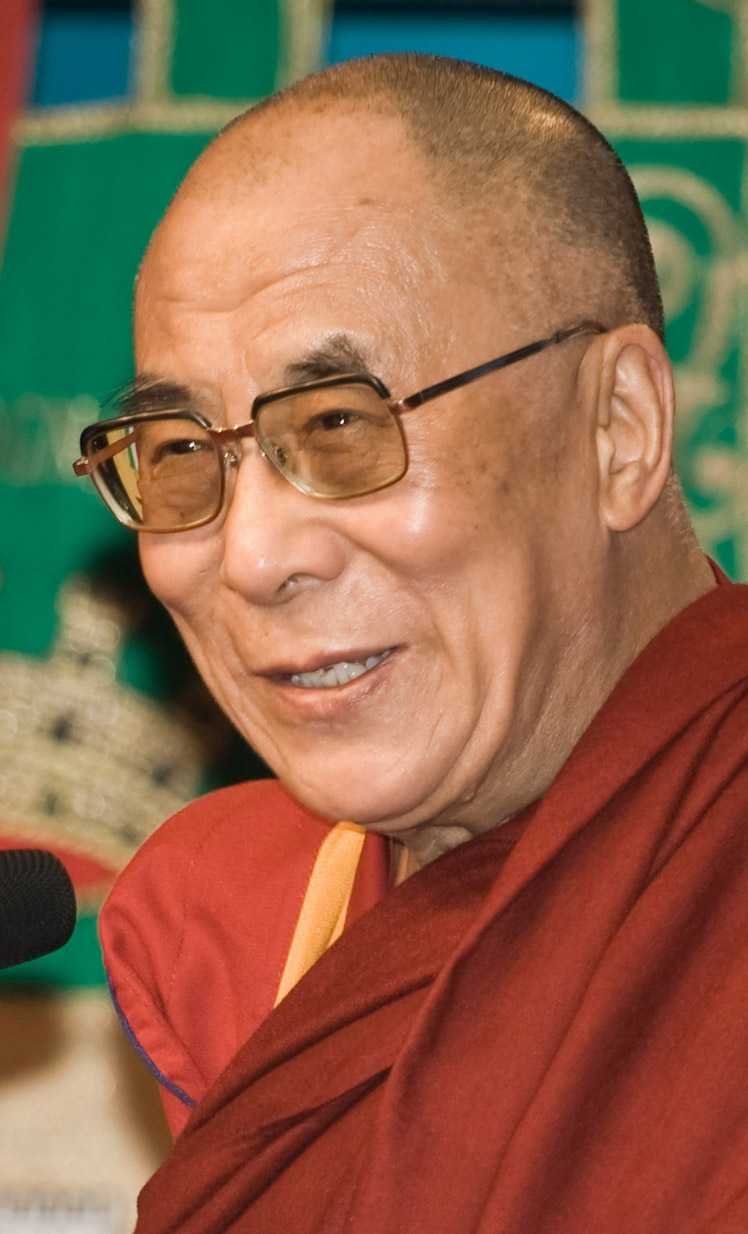
Dalai Lama

Though participants signed a Commitment to Global Peace, plans for an UN-affiliated International Advisory Council of Religion and Spiritual Leaders have not materialized.

Professor Klaus Schwab, founder of the World Economic Forum, requested the Summit to form a delegation of religious leaders to clarify the relationship between economics and religion, which led to the Religious Initiative of the World Economic Forum in January 2001.

Together with the UN World Conference Against Racism, Racial Discrimination, Xenophobia, and Related Intolerance held in Durban, South Africa (August 29 – September 7, 2000), the Summit produced a commemorative book entitled Sacred Rights, which featured statements by religious leaders explaining how religion can reduce intolerance. This book was issued to heads of states, ambassadors, and other leaders.

Hsin Tao, founder of the Museum of World Religions in Taiwan, attended the Summit as a delegate. Following the destruction of the Buddha statues in Bamiyan, Afghanistan in November 2001, he requested aid in protecting sacred sites. The Summit created the Global Commission for the Preservation of Sacred Sites in partnership with the Museum of World Religions. Inaugurated in November 2001, the commission collaborated with UNESCO and the World Monument Fund to encourage religious leaders to fundraise for the restoration of religious sites.

Subsequent efforts by the UN to foster interfaith dialogue included the UNESCO/UNITWIN Network Interreligious Dialogue for Intercultural Understanding in 2006.

== Criticism ==
The 14th Dalai Lama was not invited to the summit due to opposition by the Chinese government. Desmond Tutu said this exclusion “totally undermines the integrity of the UN and the credibility of the summit.” After international criticism, the Dalai Lama was invited 5 weeks prior to the event to deliver the keynote address at the closing session at the Waldorf Astoria Hotel instead of the United Nations building. The Dalai Lama declined the offer and instead sent delegates on his behalf.
