= Poli Grappa Museum =

Museum in Italy

The Poli Grappa Museum is a museum showcasing the history of Grappa and the process of distilling the spirit. The museum is found at the Poli Distillerie in Schiavon, Italy.

The history of distillation and of Grappa is explained by means of a brief but detailed educational tour. The Museum consists of three rooms: in the first hall, the reconstructed stills and collection of interesting documents will reveal the mysteries of the origin and the evolution of the art of distillation over the years.

In the second hall, by means of pictures, stills and apparatus for making Grappa, it will be possible to appreciate and understand the reason why this Italian distillate is unique in the world. The objects' descriptions and the images' captions are in Italian and in English.

In the third hall, there is a show-room where it is possible to taste the products of the Jacopo Poli Distillery.
