= Poli Distillerie =

Grappa distillery

Poli Distillerie is an artisan Grappa distillery solely owned by the Poli family, founded in 1898 in Schiavon, near Bassano del Grappa, in the heart of Veneto, Italy. The distillery is currently run by Jacopo Poli together with his siblings Giampaolo, Barbara and Andrea.

== History ==
The Poli Distillerie was founded in 1898 in Schiavon, near Bassano del Grappa, in the hearth of Veneto, Italy, by the Poli family.

In 2020, in the wake of the coronavirus pandemic, Poli Distillerie launched an alcohol spray to clean masks.

== Description ==
The raw material from which Grappa is made is the grape pomace, the skin of the grape, and what is left after the grape is crushed in order to make wine. The Poli Distillery gathers the grape-pomace from an area that ranges from Bassano del Grappa to the hills surrounding Marostica and Breganze, lands historically famous for the cultivation of grape vines and for the production of Grappa.

Poli Distillery distill exclusively fresh grape-pomace coming from the wineries of the area. The still is among the oldest in use today. It consists of cauldrons completely made of copper, as in centuries gone by. The distillation cycle is discontinuous. This means that the grape-pomace is put into the cauldrons and distilled using steam; after about three hours the cauldrons are unloaded and the cycle begins again. Visitors are welcome by appointment.

In Bassano del Grappa, in front of the historic wooden bridge "Ponte Vecchio", the Poli Distillerie created the Poli Grappa Museum, where the history of distillation and the history of Grappa are illustrated with efficacy in a small but suggestive area, by means of a brief but detailed educational tour. It is the largest Italian collection of historical grappas.

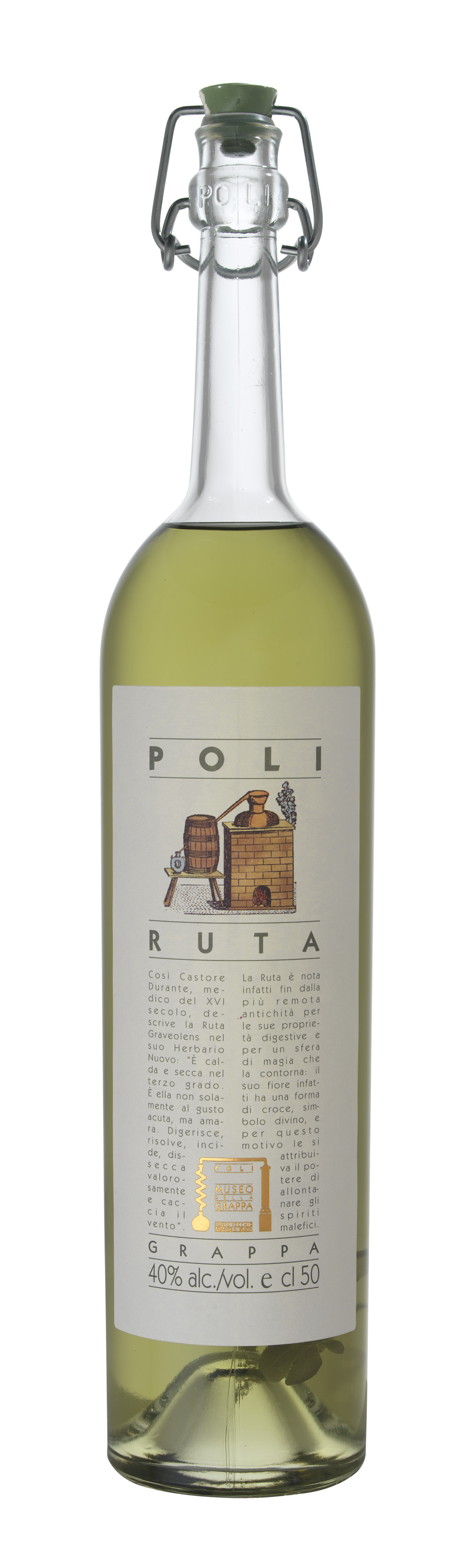
Grappa Ruta

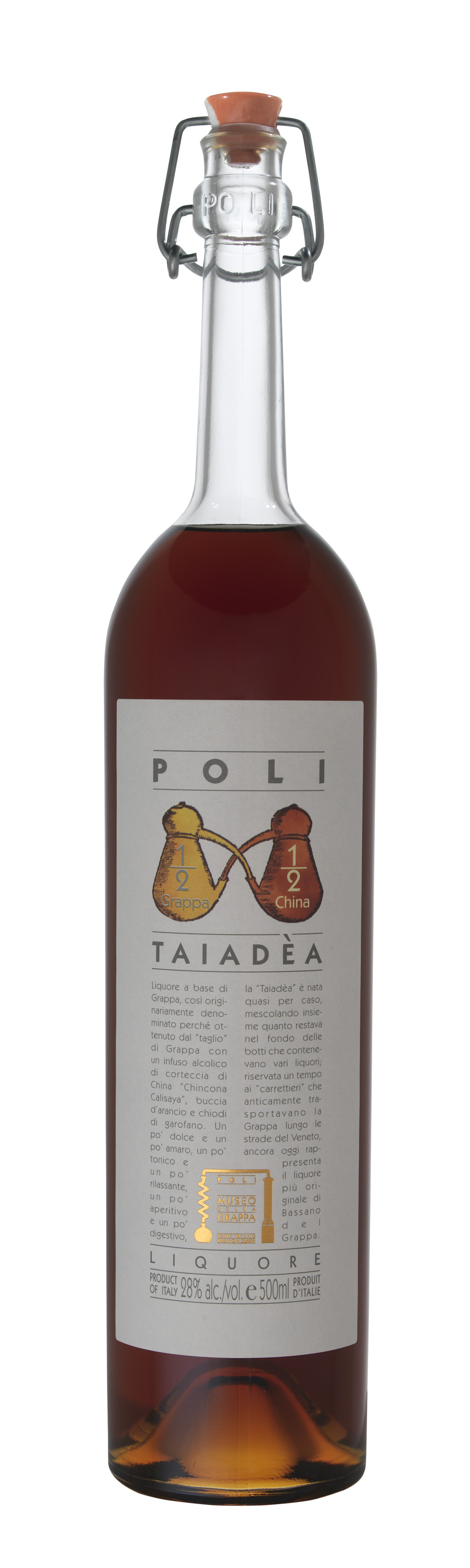
Taiadea

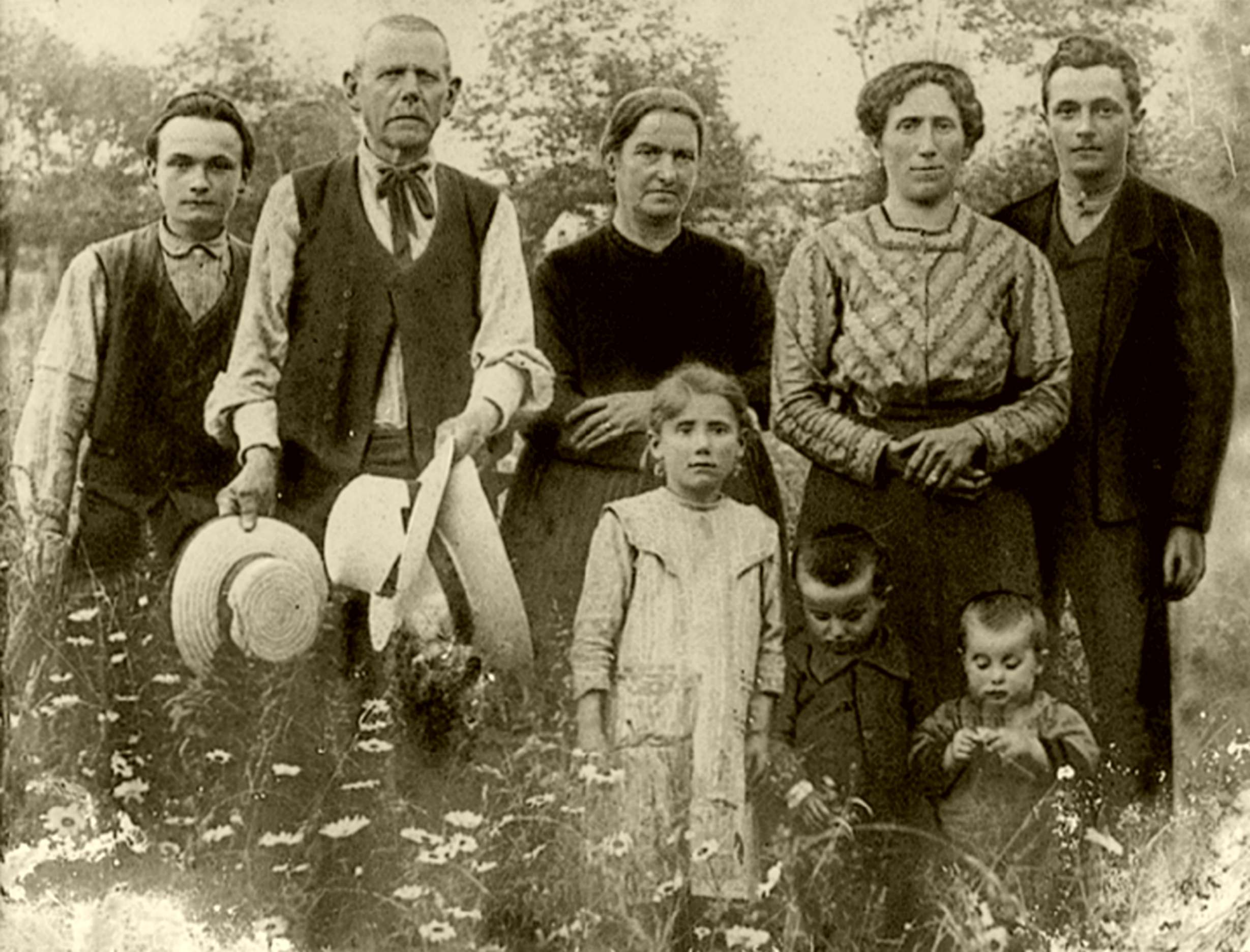
Poli Family (1915)

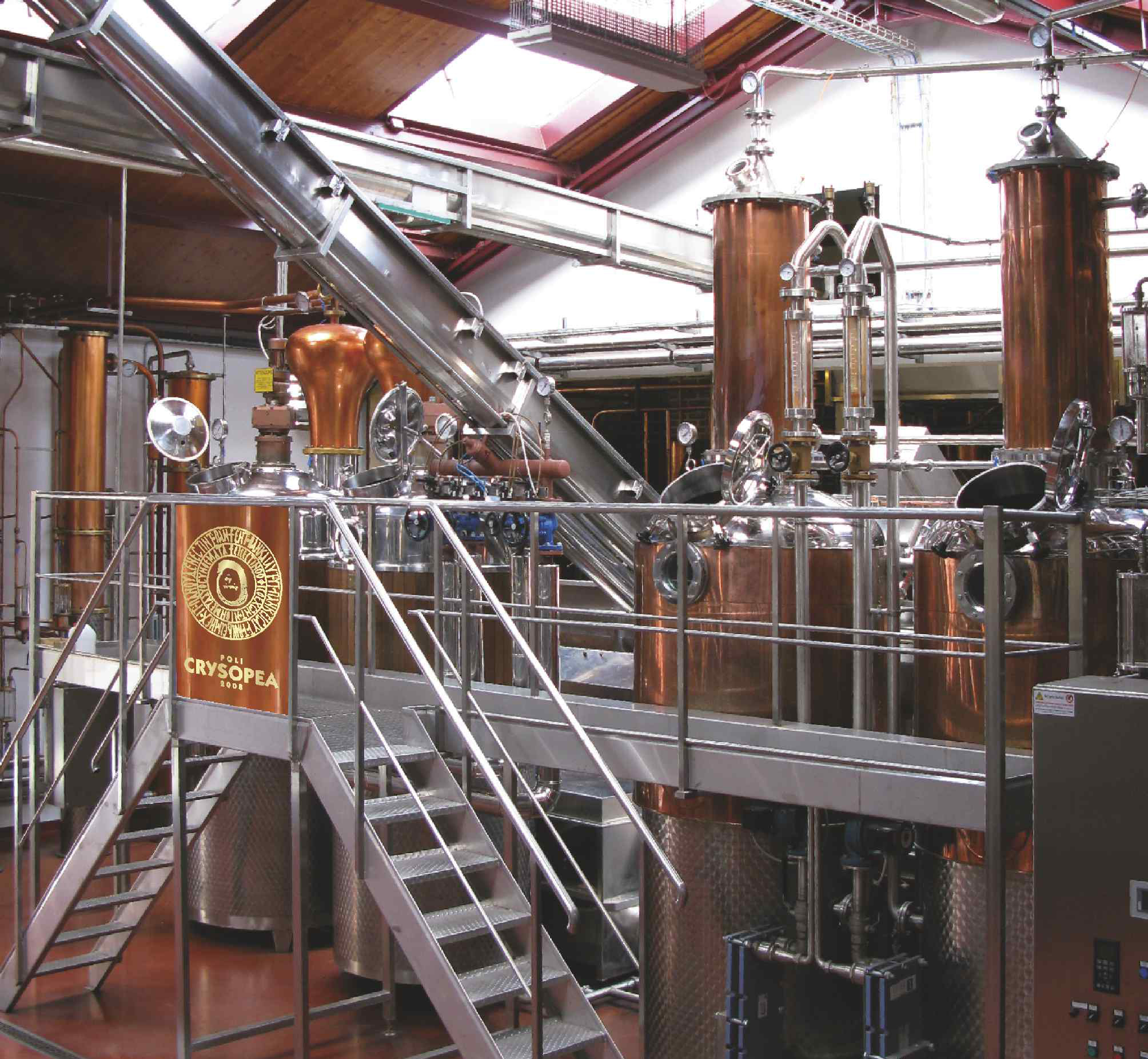

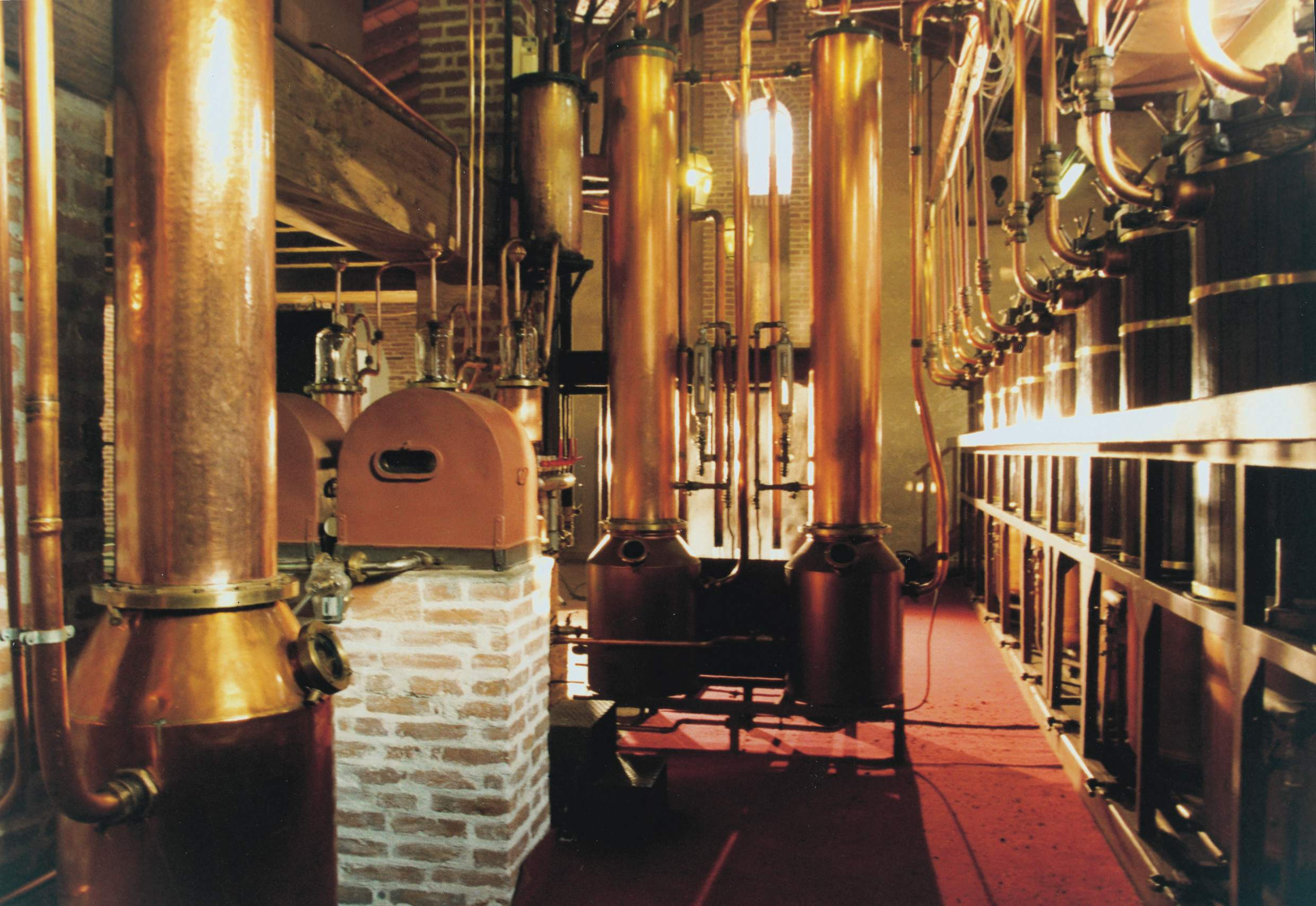
Alambic

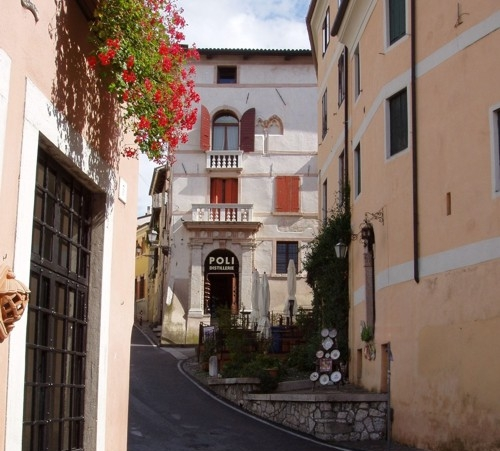
Poli Museum

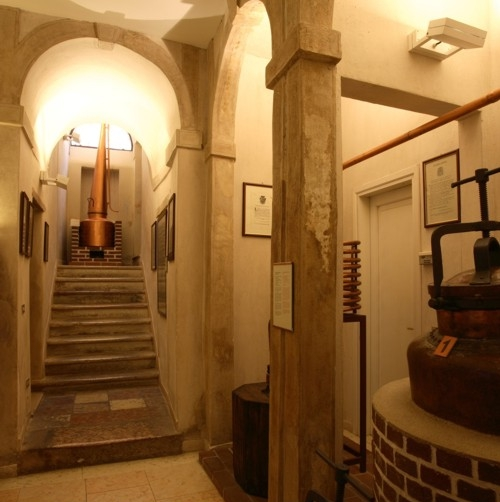
Poli Museum
