= Pietro Parolin =

Italian Catholic cardinal (born 1955)

His Eminence Pietro Parolin OMRI
- Cardinal Secretary of State
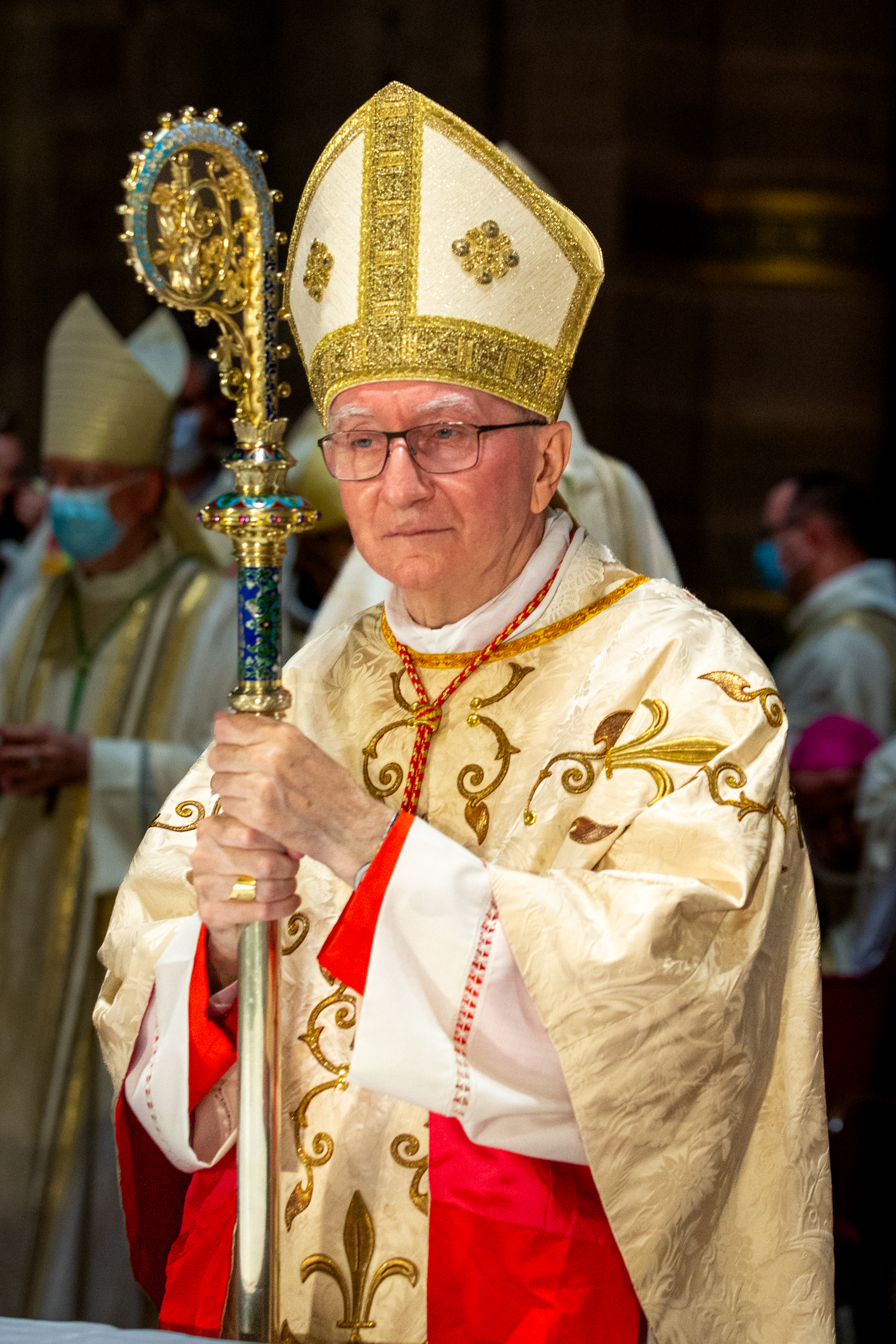
- Parolin in 2021
- Appointed: 15 October 2013
- Predecessor: Tarcisio Bertone
- Other posts: Cardinal-Bishop of Santi Simone e Giuda Taddeo a Torre Angela; Member of the Council of Cardinal Advisers
- Previous posts: Apostolic Nuncio to Venezuela (2009–2013); Titular Archbishop of Aquipendium (2009–2014)

Orders
- Ordination: 27 April 1980 by Arnoldo Onisto
- Consecration: 12 September 2009 by Benedict XVI
- Created cardinal: 22 February 2014 by Francis
- Rank: Cardinal-Bishop

Personal details
- Born: 17 January 1955 (age 71) Schiavon, Veneto, Italy
- Denomination: Catholic
- Education: Pontifical Gregorian University; Pontifical Ecclesiastical Academy
- Motto: Quis nos separabit a caritate Christi? (Latin for 'Who shall separate us from the love of Christ?')
- Signature: Pietro Parolin's signature

- Coat of arms: Pietro Parolin's coat of arms

Ordination history of Pietro Parolin
History
Priestly ordination
- Ordained by: Arnoldo Onisto
Episcopal consecration
- Principal consecrator: Pope Benedict XVI
- Co-consecrators: Tarcisio Bertone; William Joseph Levada
Cardinalate
- Elevated by: Pope Francis
Episcopal succession
Bishops consecrated by Pietro Parolin as principal consecrator
- Aldo Giordano: 14 December 2013
- Hubertus van Megen: 17 May 2014
- Marek Zalewski: 31 May 2014
- Wojciech Załuski: 9 August 2014
- Joël Mercier: 19 March 2015
- Paolo Rocco Gualtieri: 30 May 2015
- Piergiorgio Bertoldi: 2 June 2015
- Alberto Ortega Martín: 10 October 2015
- Pierantonio Pavanello: 20 February 2016
- Paul Tighe: 27 February 2016
- Gábor Pintér: 15 July 2016
- Andrzej Józwowicz: 27 May 2017
- Angelo Accattino: 25 November 2017
- Dagoberto Campos Salas: 29 September 2018
- Marco Mellino: 15 December 2018
- Christophe Zakhia El-Kassis: 19 January 2019
- Gianfranco Gallone: 19 March 2019
- Tymon Tytus Chmielecki: 13 May 2019
- Luís Miguel Muñoz Cárdaba: 25 July 2020
- Ante Jozić: 16 September 2020
- Giovanni Gaspari: 17 October 2020
- Mark Miles: 25 April 2021
- Fermín Emilio Sosa Rodríguez: 25 June 2021
- Gilles Reithinger: 4 July 2021
- Visvaldas Kulbokas: 14 August 2021
- Dieudonné Datonou: 20 November 2021
- Andrea Ripa: 26 February 2022
- Javier Herrera Corona: 23 April 2022
- Jean-Sylvain Emien Mambé: 7 May 2022
- Luigi Roberto Cona: 2 December 2022
- Alejandro Arellano Cedillo: 25 March 2023
- Rolandas Makrickas: 15 April 2023
- Diego Giovanni Ravelli: 3 June 2023
- Gian Luca Perici: 15 July 2023
- Germano Penemote: 12 August 2023
- Vincenzo Turturro: 9 March 2024

Pietro Parolin (Note: Italian: [ˈpjɛːtro paroˈlin], Venetian: [paɾoˈliŋ]) (born 17 January 1955) is an Italian Catholic prelate who has served as the Vatican's Secretary of State since 2013, and has served as a member of the Council of Cardinals since 2014, the same year he was made a cardinal.

Before his tenure as secretary of state, Parolin worked in the diplomatic service of the Holy See for 30 years, where his assignments included terms in Nigeria, Mexico and Venezuela, as well as more than six years as Undersecretary of State for Relations with States. Parolin set the Vatican's foreign policy stances under Pope Francis. Parolin was one of the primary architects of the Vatican's 2018 agreement with China, which allows the pope to approve and veto bishops approved by the Chinese Communist Party. During the 2025 conclave, over which he presided as the senior voting cardinal bishop, Parolin was considered papabile, a leading candidate to succeed Francis, and was reportedly the runner-up on the final ballot that elected Pope Leo XIV.

== Early life ==
Parolin was born in Schiavon, Province of Vicenza, the son of a hardware store manager, Luigi Parolin (1921–1965), and an elementary school teacher, Ada Miotti (1928–2024). He has a sister and a brother. When he was ten years old, his father died in a car accident. After he was ordained on 27 April 1980, he took up graduate studies in canon law at the Pontifical Gregorian University and in diplomacy at the Pontifical Ecclesiastical Academy. He entered the Holy See's diplomatic service in 1986 at the age of 31. He served for three years in the Nunciature of Nigeria where he became familiar with the problems in Christian–Muslim relations.

At the Nunciature of Mexico from 1989 to 1992, Parolin contributed to the final phase of the work begun by Archbishop Girolamo Prigione which led to the legal recognition of the Catholic Church in 1992 and the establishment of diplomatic relations between the Holy See and Mexico after 130 years. These negotiations led to Mexico officially shedding the country's secular and anti-clerical imprint, which extended to its Constitution. From 1992 to 2002, Parolin worked at the Section for Relations with States of the Secretariat of State in Rome, with primary responsibility for Spain, Andorra, Italy, and San Marino.

Since 2000 he has worked with the then-Bishop Attilio Nicora on the implementation of the revision of the Lateran Concordat of 1984, with particular reference to the Italian military ordinariate.

== Undersecretary of State for Relations with States ==
Parolin was Undersecretary of State for Relations with States from 30 November 2002 to 17 August 2009. Parolin has also been at the forefront of Vatican efforts to approve and implement the Nuclear Nonproliferation Treaty (NPT). Addressing the International Atomic Energy Agency on 18 September 2006, at its headquarters in Vienna, Parolin referred to this treaty as "the basis to pursue nuclear disarmament and an important element for further development of nuclear energy applications for peaceful purposes." He said: "Since this treaty is the only multilateral legal instrument currently available, intended to bring about a nuclear weapons-free world, it must not be allowed to be weakened. Humanity deserves no less than the full cooperation of all states in this important matter." Concerning international negotiations with respect to Iran's nuclear program, he said "that the present difficulties can and must be overcome through diplomatic channels, making use of all the means that diplomacy has at its disposal and considers necessary to eliminate all the elements which objectively impede mutual trust."

In September 2007, at the opening of the UN, Parolin argued, "We often hear in the halls of the United Nations of 'the responsibility to protect'. The Holy See believes that applies also in the context of climate change. States have a shared 'responsibility to protect' the world's climate through mitigation/adaptation, and above all a shared 'responsibility to protect' our planet and ensure that present and future generations be able to live in a healthy and safe environment." Parolin represented the Vatican in a variety of sensitive assignments, including trips to North Korea and Vietnam as well as the 2007 Annapolis Conference on the Middle East convened by the Bush administration to revive Israeli-Palestinian peace talks.

As the Vatican's "deputy foreign minister", Parolin dealt with all the sensitive dossiers on the Holy See's relations with Vietnam (he was partly responsible for paving the way to full diplomatic relations between the two) and the legal issues between the Vatican and Israel which remain unresolved. At the beginning of Pope Benedict's pontificate, direct contact was re-established with China. During his time as undersecretary, Parolin scored some significant breakthroughs, such as cementing ties between the Holy See and Vietnam, re-establishing direct contact with Beijing in 2005 and helping secure the liberation of 15 British navy personnel captured by Iranian forces in the Persian Gulf in April 2007.

== Nuncio ==
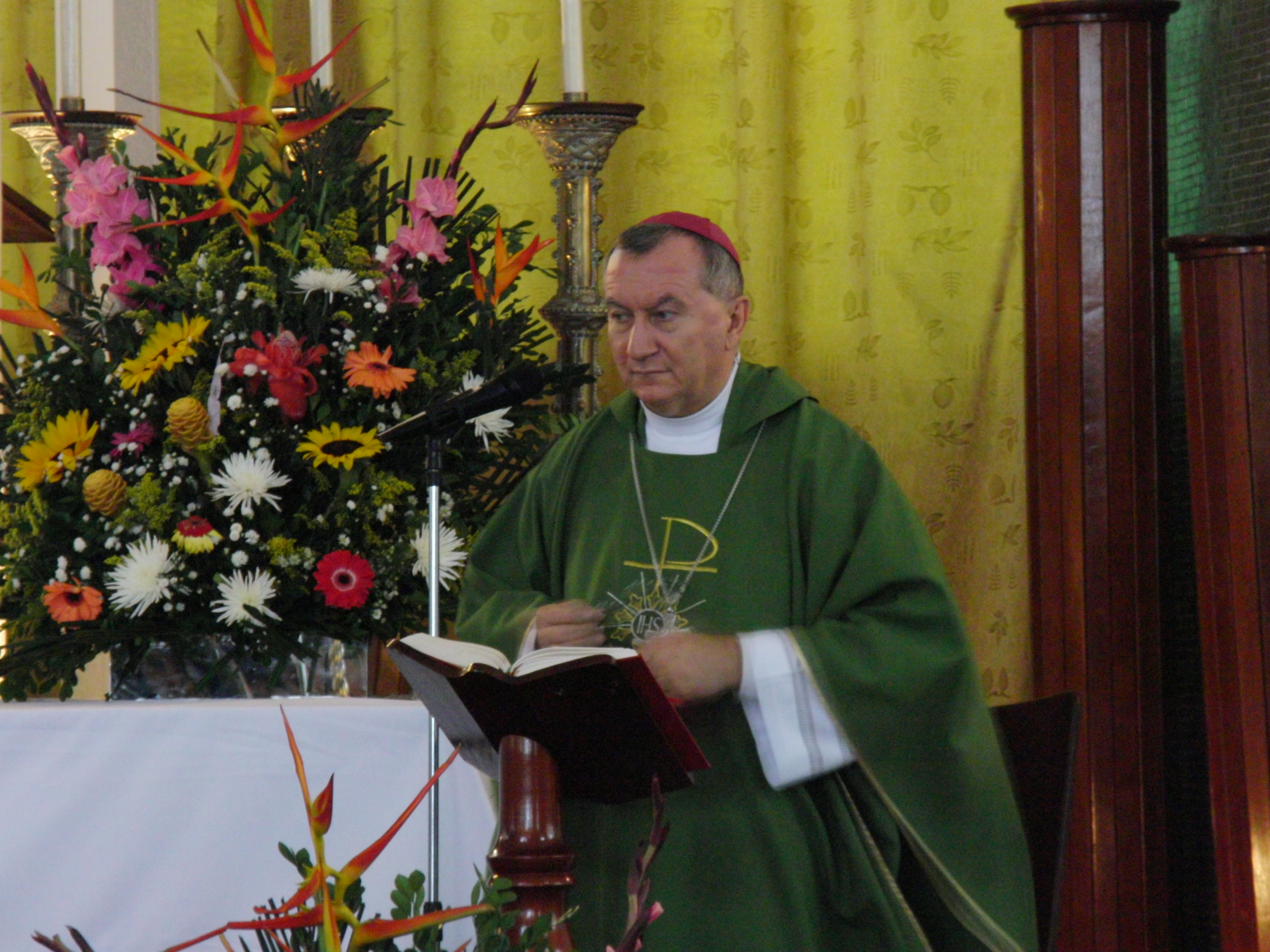
Monsignor Parolin during a mass in Caracas, July 2012

On 17 August 2009, Pope Benedict XVI appointed Parolin Titular Archbishop of Aquipendium and Apostolic Nuncio to Venezuela. He was consecrated a bishop on 12 September 2009 by Benedict XVI, with Tarcisio Cardinal Bertone and William Cardinal Levada as co-consecrators. The Venezuela assignment was expected to be difficult, since conflicts between the State and the Church in Venezuela were on the rise as President Hugo Chávez attempted to advance his socialist revolution.

== Secretary of State ==
=== Under Francis ===
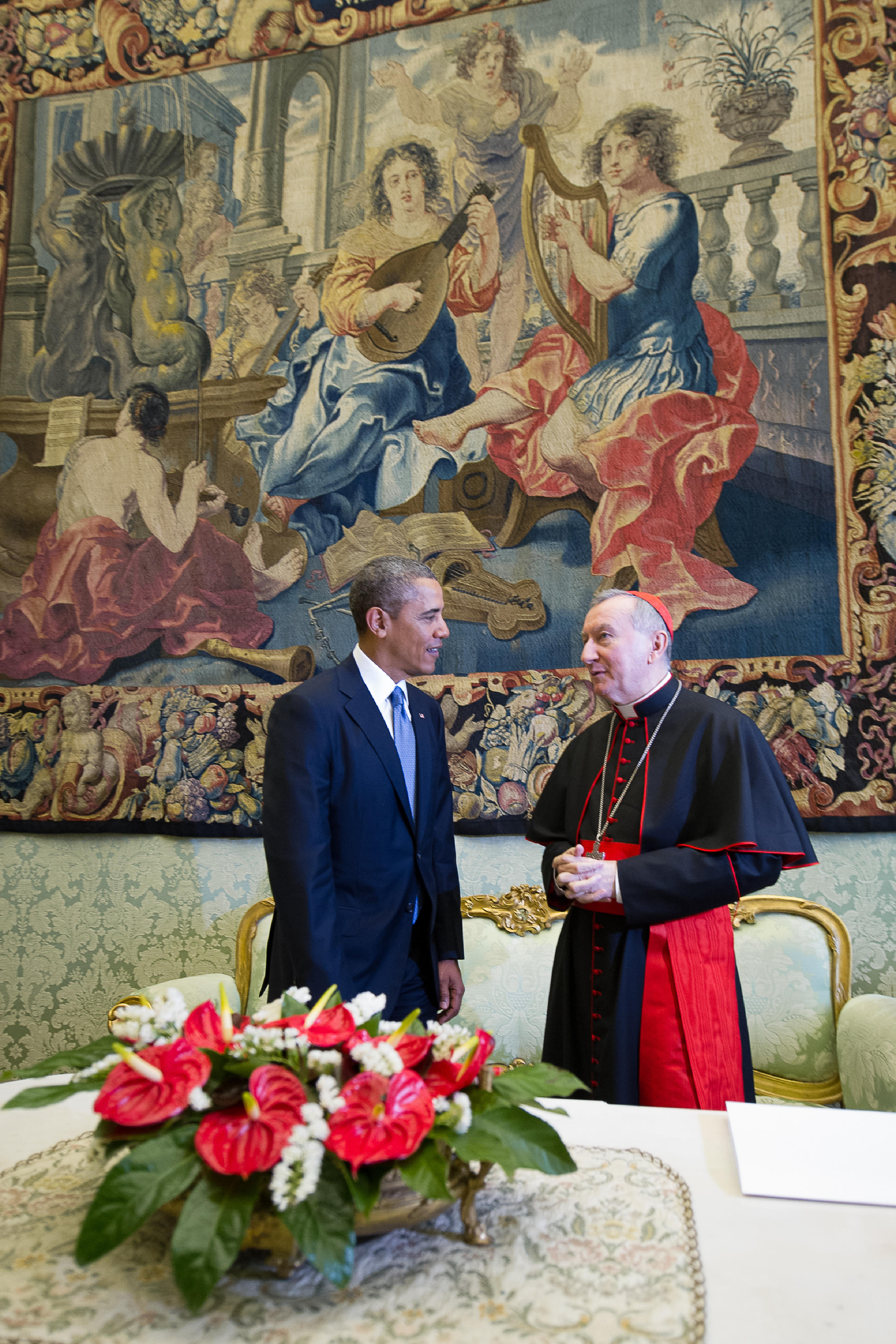
Parolin with US President Barack Obama, 27 March 2014

On 31 August 2013, Pope Francis appointed Parolin Secretary of State, replacing Cardinal Tarcisio Bertone. Parolin took office on 15 October. At 58, Parolin became the youngest Secretary of State since 1929, when Cardinal Eugenio Pacelli (later Pope Pius XII) was appointed to the position at the age of 53. He said: "The pope's initiatives have given the secretary of state an impetus and have also created a new diplomatic momentum." When asked if he would be spearheading a new diplomatic offensive for peace, he noted that it was a complicated question but said, "Yes, I hope that we can recoup" that drive. "We have this great advantage in respect to other churches, to other religions: We can count on an international institutional presence through diplomacy," he said.

On 16 December, Parolin was named to a five-year renewable term as a member of the Congregation for Bishops. On 19 February 2014 he was appointed a member of the Congregation for the Oriental Churches. Parolin became Francis' first cardinal when he was made Cardinal-Priest of Santi Simone e Giuda Taddeo a Torre Angela at a papal general consistory on 22 February 2014. He attended meetings of the Council of Cardinal Advisers on a regular basis and in July 2014 became the council's ninth member.

In 2014, Venezuela's President Nicolas Maduro invited Parolin to mediate talks between his government and opposition in hopes of stemming violence that killed dozens in the nation's worst unrest in a decade. He asked that Parolin, a former nuncio to Venezuela, be named a "good faith witness" to a dialogue the parties had agreed upon after two months of protests. Venezuela's opposition coalition had indicated that current nuncio, Archbishop Aldo Giordano, would be attending the first formal talks. Henrique Capriles, the opposition's two-time presidential candidate who narrowly lost an election to Maduro the year before, confirmed he would take part in the discussions.

In December 2014, Parolin asked the United States to find an "adequate humanitarian solution" for prisoners held at the Guantanamo Bay detention camp, a reflection of Pope Francis' concern that prisoners be treated with dignity and not be subject to inhumane treatment. Parolin made the request during a Vatican meeting with US Secretary of State John Kerry. The Vatican said they discussed the US commitment to closing the facility and that Parolin expressed the Holy See's desire that "favourable attention be paid to finding adequate humanitarian solutions for current inmates".

The Holy See was credited with playing a major role in the reestablishment of Cuba–US relations. Parolin moderated the October 2014 meeting between Cuban and US officials as their negotiations neared an agreement. In 2015, Parolin was asked whether the normalization of Cuba–US relations pointed toward a new "golden age" of Vatican diplomacy. He said that "the president of the United States has already thanked the Pope for the support he has given to this important step" and said: "Holy See diplomacy is always there, to help to build bridges". Parolin also said the Holy See's diplomacy "is now more active…(not only) waiting, but also proposing (solutions for peace), since there are so many conflicts."

Parolin called for an intervention in Libya to stop a possible alliance between the country's Islamic government and the Islamic State. Parolin spoke about the chaos there after ISIS beheaded 21 Egyptian Coptic Christians, describing the incident as "terrifying" and the situation "grave". He stressed the need for "a quick response". Parolin added that "any armed intervention must be carried forward under the framework of international law" and "under the umbrella of the United Nations".

In May 2015, after the passage of the Marriage Equality Referendum in Ireland, which extended marriage rights to same-sex couples, Parolin said: "I was very saddened by this result. I don't think we can speak only about a defeat for Christian principles, but a defeat for humanity." In June 2015, he visited Abu Dhabi to inaugurate Saint Paul's Church in Musaffah, the city's second Catholic parish.

Parolin has stressed the importance of continuity. He believes Pope Francis simply tried to guide the church to be the church of Christ and rejected the idea that Francis was starting a revolution. Parolin defends the importance of unchangeable dogmas and asserts the relevance of sacred tradition. He has described celibacy as a discipline that could be changed, but cannot simply be dismissed as outdated. In a keynote speech at the Pontifical Gregorian University in February 2016, Parolin defended celibacy as a "gift" that must be received and nurtured with "joyful perseverance" and criticized the suggestion that the shortage of vocations be addressed by modifying the requirement of priestly celibacy.

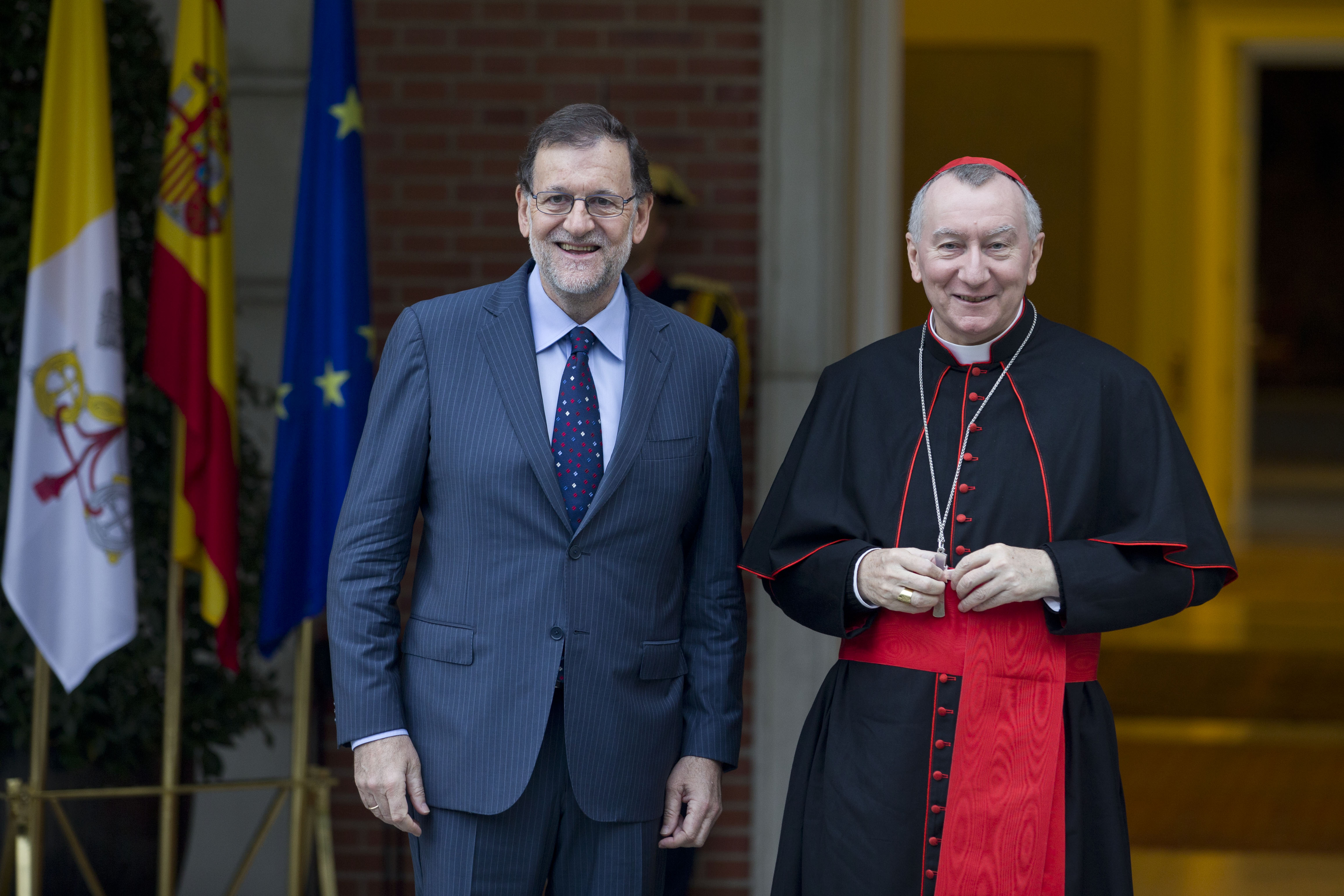
Parolin with Prime Minister of Spain Mariano Rajoy, 14 October 2016

In May 2016, Parolin visited Estonia to mark the 25th anniversary of the reintroduction of diplomatic relations between Estonia and the Holy See. He spoke at the University of Tartu on the precise meaning of their international relations. Parolin was appointed a member of the Congregation for Divine Worship and the Discipline of the Sacraments in October 2016. Following the resignation of Marie Collins from the Pontifical Commission for the Protection of Minors, Parolin said she quit because she wanted to "shake the tree" in the Vatican. Collins said some members of the Church's administration, the Roman Curia, have hindered and blocked the commission's efforts, naming the Congregation for the Doctrine of the Faith. Parolin called the lack of cooperation from some Vatican offices "shameful".

Parolin told Italy's La Stampa the flow of migrants and refugees into Europe is testing "the spirit of solidarity and subsidiarity" of the European Union, and acknowledged the large number of people fleeing to the continent poses a security problem. "Terrorism certainly finds fertile ground in poverty, lack of jobs, and social marginalization", he said, adding that since World War II, Europe has tried to "free itself" from its cultural heritage and values, and this has created a vacuum in which young people cannot find the answers to their existential questions. In 2017, Parolin became the Vatican's first Secretary of State in 19 years to visit Moscow.

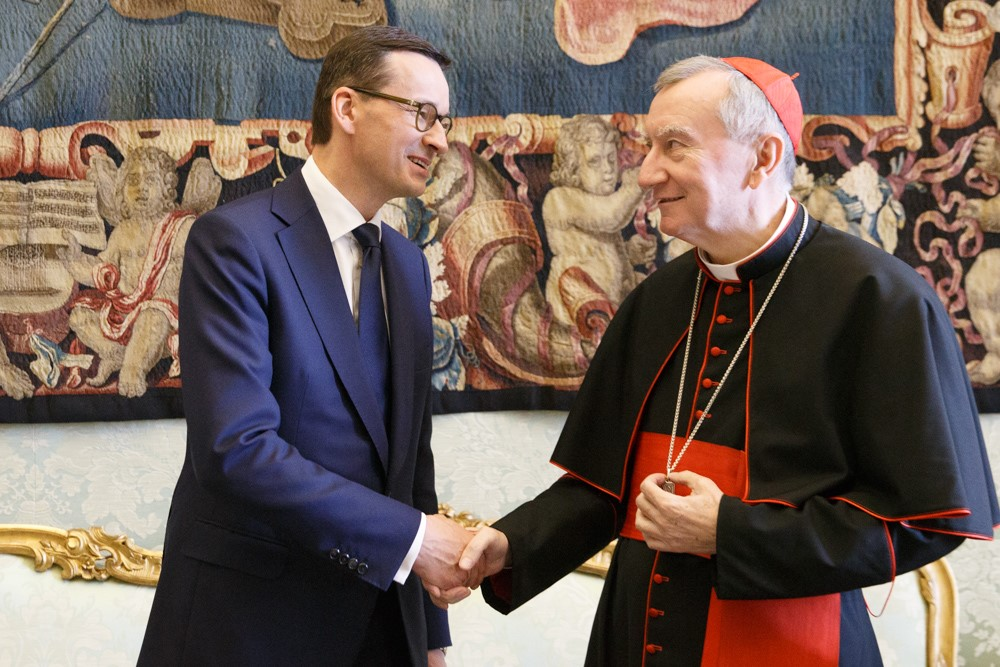
Parolin shakes hands with Prime Minister of Poland Mateusz Morawiecki, 4 June 2018

In a 2018 interview, Cardinal Joseph Zen said "Pope Francis does not know the real Communist Party in China, but Parolin should know. He was there [in the Secretariat of State] so many years, so he must know. He may be happy to encourage the pope to be optimistic about the negotiations ... but that's dangerous. Pope Francis needs someone to calm him down from his enthusiasm." He added that "It seems the Secretary of State wants to have a solution anyway. He is so optimistic. That's dangerous. I told the pope that he [Parolin] has a poisoned mind. He is very sweet, but I have no trust in this person. He believes in diplomacy, not in our faith." Parolin countered that "no personal point of view can be considered as an exclusive interpreter of what is good for Chinese Catholics" and said: "If someone is asked to make a sacrifice, small or great, it must be clear to everyone that this is not the price of a political exchange, but falls within the evangelical perspective of a greater good, the good of the Church of Christ."

Pope Francis raised him to the rank of Cardinal Bishop effective 28 June 2018. In October 2018, Parolin said that Paul VI had rejected a version of Humane Vitae that "was limited to a rigorous reaffirmation of doctrine to which Christians and all people were asked to adhere docilely and without reservation". Post-publication debates, Parolin said, made it impossible for many people to see its accent on mercy.

In 2019, Parolin defended the Holy See–China agreement on the appointment of bishops. On 3 April, Parolin told journalists, "We signed this agreement to help advance religious freedom, to find normalization for the Catholic community there, and then for all other religions to have space and a role to play in society which is recognized." Steve Bannon said that he might lead a lawsuit to compel the Holy See to release the text of the deal under the terms of the 1961 Vienna Convention on Diplomatic Relations. Earlier in 2015, Parolin was ex officio a member of the Commission of Cardinals of the Institute for the Works of Religion. On 21 September 2020, at the end of its five-year mandate, a new board makeup was announced, omitting the Secretary of State, thus Pope Francis did not confirm Parolin in the role. On 15 October 2020, he confirmed Parolin's membership of the Council of Cardinals.

In June 2019 the Secretariat of State suggested that clergy in China make a reservation of conscience when registering, affirming CPCA requirements only so far as it is "faithful to the principles of Catholic doctrine."

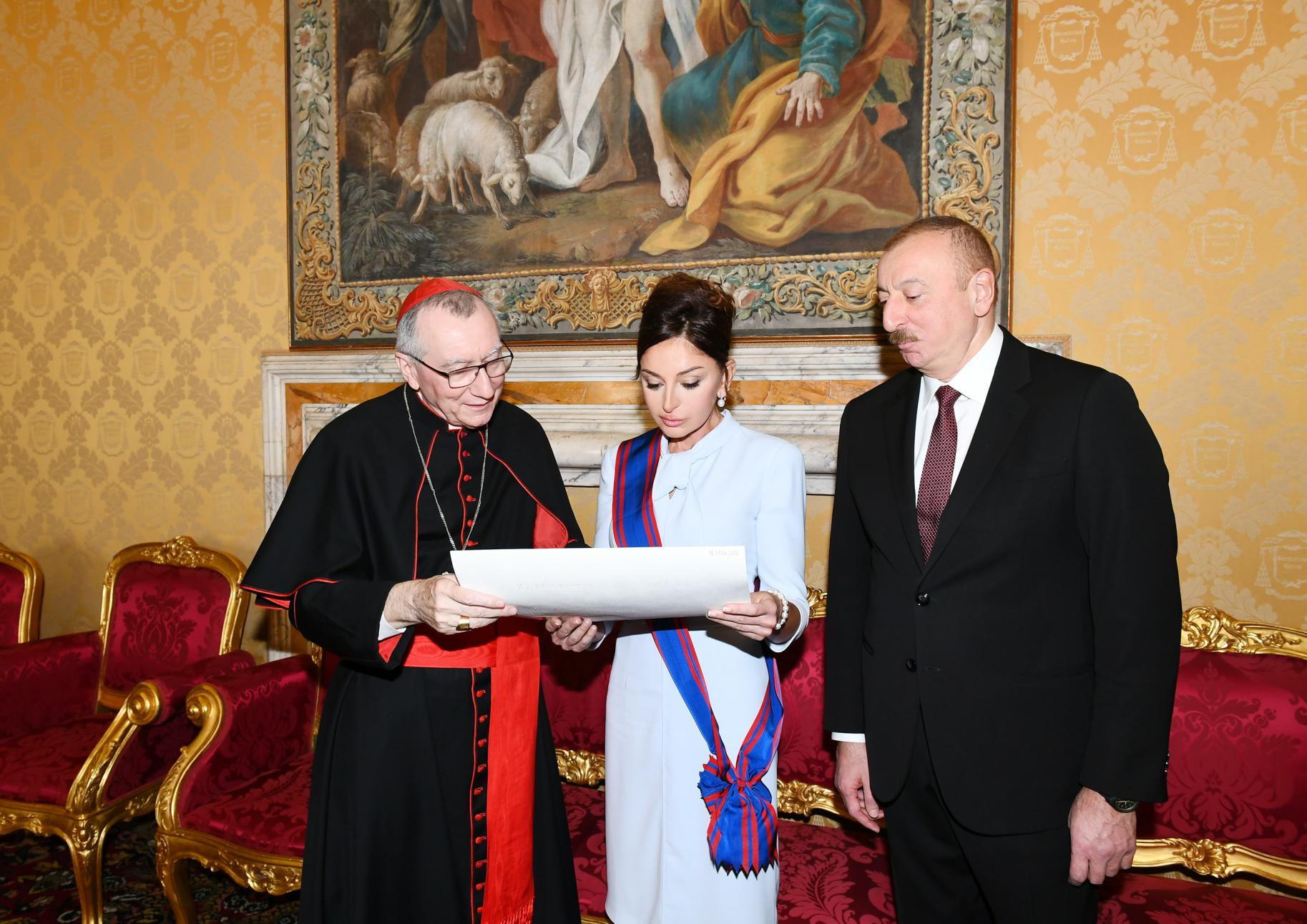
Parolin with Azerbaijani President Ilham Aliyev and First Lady Mehriban Aliyeva, 22 February 2020

Following the Taliban victory in Afghanistan in August 2021, Pope Francis appointed Parolin to engage in talks with the Taliban in order to discourage them from taking reprisal measures on civilians who worked with the coalition. A communiqué from Parolin on the 2022 Russian invasion of Ukraine, without naming Vladimir Putin, said that while the worst-case scenario was unfolding, "there is still time for goodwill, there is still room for negotiation, there is still room to exercise a wisdom that prevents partisan interests from prevailing, that protects the legitimate aspirations of all and spares the world the folly and horrors of war". The previous day Pope Francis had urged politicians to make an exercise of conscience before God for their actions over Ukraine, and declared 2 March, Ash Wednesday, as an international day of fasting and prayer for peace. In May 2022, Parolin stated that supplying weapons to Ukraine to help it defend itself is morally legitimate, "There is a right to armed defence in the case of aggression." He attended the coronation of the British King Charles III and Queen Camilla on 6 May 2023, representing Pope Francis.

In 2023, Parolin said there was a need for dialogue with the German bishops after a recent vote in favour of blessing same-sex unions, insisting that the move does not align with official Catholic doctrine. Parolin said, "A local, particular church cannot make a decision like that which involves the discipline of the Universal Church. There must certainly be a discussion with Rome and the rest of the Churches in the world ... to clarify what are the decisions to make." In July 2023, he visited Armenia and Azerbaijan to promote peace talks between the two states. He participated in the Global Faith Leaders COP28 Summit in Abu Dhabi on 6–7 November 2023, and read the Pope's climate change statement at COP28 on his behalf as the pope was unable to attend due to ill health.

=== Conclave ===
Parolin was repeatedly referred to as papabile, and was widely considered a favorite candidate to succeed Francis as Pope. He was a cardinal elector and presided over the 2025 conclave held after the passing of Pope Francis. Entering the conclave, he was seen by the media and betting markets as one of the favorites to take the papacy. He reportedly was the runner up on the fourth and final ballot. According to the Italian media after the conclave, his candidacy faltered when his vote count stagnated between 40 and 50 votes, well short of the 89 votes required to achieve the two-thirds supermajority needed to become pope. The conclave ultimately elected the American cardinal Robert Francis Prevost, who chose the name Leo XIV. As the most senior cardinal bishop present in the room, Cardinal Parolin carried out the duty of asking the pope-elect if he would accept the papacy and what his papal name would be.

=== Under Leo XIV ===
In August 2025 Cardinal Parolin inaugurated a memorial to the murdered Archbishop Michael Courtney in Burundi. In December 2025 he visited Pemba, the capital of the Cabo Delgado province Mozambique in order to ease tensions between Muslims and Christians with an insurgent group, Ansar al-Sunna, which supports the creation of an Islamic state. Parolin met with local politicians and Church representatives. He also visited with President Daniel Chapo to mark the 30th anniversary of diplomatic relations between Mozambique and the Holy See. During the visit to Cabo Delgado Parolin met with victims and internally displaced people, saying: "I came to tell all of you, men and women of the people of God who live in Cabo Delgado, that you are not alone. You are not alone! The Holy Father, and the united and Universal Church are with you. Your suffering, your fears, but also your hopes are in the heart of Mother Church and hold a special place in the heart of the successor of Peter"

Speaking on the deaths during the 2025–2026 Iranian protests, Cardinal Parolin stated, "I ask myself, how it is possible to rage against one's own people, that there have been so many deaths—it is an endless tragedy."

In January 2026 Cardinal Parolin visited Denmark and in ecumenical Vespers at Copenhagen cathedral. He celebrated Mass for the 1200th anniversary of St. Ansgar's evangelising mission in Denmark. He visited Frederik X of Denmark and the foreign minister.

== Personal life ==
Parolin speaks his native Venetian and Italian, and is also fluent in English, French, and Spanish.

== Positions ==
=== Foreign policy ===
Parolin visited Ukraine to close a popular Marian pilgrimage, and met with civil and ecclesial authorities amid the Holy See's continued push for peace. Parolin's 19–24 July trip was his first official visit since the Russia invasion of Ukraine. At COP 29 in November 2024, Colombia's environment minister said that Parolin had aligned with Saudi Arabia, Russia, Iran, and Egypt to obstruct a deal which would have provided support, including financial help, for women at the forefront of climate change. In February 2025, when the pope's health worsened, Parolin rejected rumours that Pope Francis would resign. In 2025, Parolin, along with Archbishop Paul Gallagher met JD Vance for "an exchange of opinions on the international situation, especially regarding countries affected by war, political tensions and difficult humanitarian situations, with particular attention to migrants, refugees, and prisoners".

Amid international discussions on new diplomatic initiatives to address global conflicts, U.S. President Donald Trump invited the Holy See to join his proposed "Board of Peace". In February 2026, Parolin stated that the Vatican would not participate, emphasizing that major global crises should primarily be addressed through the United Nations.

==== Arab-Israeli conflict ====
Positions taken by Parolin include denouncing Israel and its actions in Gaza, calling for a halt in war crimes and protection of citizens. He criticized Donald Trump's Gaza Strip proposal, saying that "whoever was born and has lived in Gaza must remain on their land".

Parolin maintains the traditional views of the Church regarding Zionism and support for a two-state solution. In February 2024, Cardinal Parolin told reporters that it was time for Israel to change its strategy in Gaza, how there are "other paths have to be found to resolve the problem of Gaza, the problem of Palestine."

On 13 February 2024, he stated:

Israel's right to self-defense has been invoked to justify that this operation is proportional, but with 30,000 dead, it's not.

The Israeli Embassy to the Holy See called his remarks "a deplorable declaration".

==== China ====
Parolin is credited as responsible for a controversial and unpublished Holy See-China agreement first reached in 2018, by which the Vatican recognizes the Communist Party-approved Church in China alongside the underground church, seems not to criticize control or persecution of Catholics, and is thought to enjoy final say over the appointment of bishops. He was pointedly criticized for the deal and accused of 'blatantly lying' about it and 'manipulating the Pope' by Cardinal Joseph Zen of Hong Kong. When Zen was arrested in 2022, Parolin expressed sadness but reiterated his hope that the deal be renewed, and reiterated that hope again in 2024. Ahead of the 2025 conclave, Parolin's association with the China agreement was named as a likely obstacle to the possibility of him being elected Pope.

=== Euthanasia and living wills ===
Concerning euthanasia, he condemned the decision of countries to introduce it into their legal systems, stating that it is motivated by "hubris", or "the violent arrogance of those who want to put themselves on a par with God" in deciding when to die. When Italy approved the law on living wills, he invoked conscientious objection on certain points of the new legislation as legitimate and necessary.

=== Ecclesiastical celibacy ===
In an interview with the Venezuelan newspaper El Universal, he said he was open to revising the rule that requires celibacy for clergy of the Latin Church: "Celibacy is not a dogma of the Church" and "can be discussed because it is an ecclesiastical tradition". "It is possible to talk and reflect on issues that are not defined by faith, and to consider certain changes, but always in the service of unity and always according to God's will."

=== Democracy in the Church ===
In the same interview, he addressed the issue of democracy in the Church: "Greater democratisation is certainly needed in the Church." "It has always been said that the Church is not a democracy. However, in these times there is a greater democratic spirit in the common feeling that must be listened to carefully, and I believe that the Pope has indicated this as a goal of his pontificate."

=== Same-sex marriage ===
In 2015, following the Irish citizens' approval of the referendum legalising same-sex marriage, the cardinal declared that the outcome of the vote was "a defeat for humanity", saying he was very saddened by what had happened.

=== Blessing of same-sex couples ===
Following the promulgation of Fiducia supplicans and protests from traditionalist Catholics and some bishops, particularly in Africa, he refused to comment on the legality of the document, limiting himself to saying that there has always been "change in the Church, the Church is open and attentive to the signs of the times but must be faithful to the Gospel."

== Distinctions ==
- Italy: Knight Grand Cross of the Order of Merit of the Italian Republic (2005)
- Serbia: Cross of the Order of the Republic of Serbia (2015)
- Romania: Order of the Star of Romania
- Mexico: Band of the Order of the Aztec Eagle (2014)
- Latvia: Order of the Three Stars (2021)
- European Union: Honourable Member of the European Order of Merit (2026)

== Notes ==
Diplomatic posts
Preceded by Celestino Migliore	Undersecretary for Relations with States; 2002–2009	Succeeded by Ettore Balestrero
Preceded by Giacinto Berloco	Apostolic Nuncio to Venezuela; 17 August 2009 – 15 October 2013	Succeeded by Aldo Giordano
Catholic Church titles
Preceded by Luigi Boccadoro	Archbishop of Aquipendium; 17 August 2009 – 22 February 2014	Succeeded by Fabio Fabene
Preceded by Tarcisio Bertone	President of the Interdicasterial Commission on Particular Churches; 15 October 2013 – present	Incumbent
Preceded by Tarcisio Bertone	President of the Interdicasterial Commission for the Church in Eastern Europe; 15 October 2013 – present	Incumbent
Preceded by Tarcisio Bertone	Protector of the Pontifical Ecclesiastical Academy; 15 October 2013 – present	Incumbent
Preceded by titular church established	Cardinal Priest of Santi Simone e Giuda Taddeo a Torre Angela; 22 February 2014 – 28 June 2018	Incumbent
Preceded by Himself as Cardinal Priest	Cardinal Bishop of Santi Simone e Giuda Taddeo e Torre Angela; 28 June 2018 – present	Incumbent
Political offices
Preceded by Tarcisio Bertone	Cardinal Secretary of State; 15 October 2013 – present	Incumbent
