= Global Faith Leaders COP28 Summit =

2023 interfaith summit to address climate change

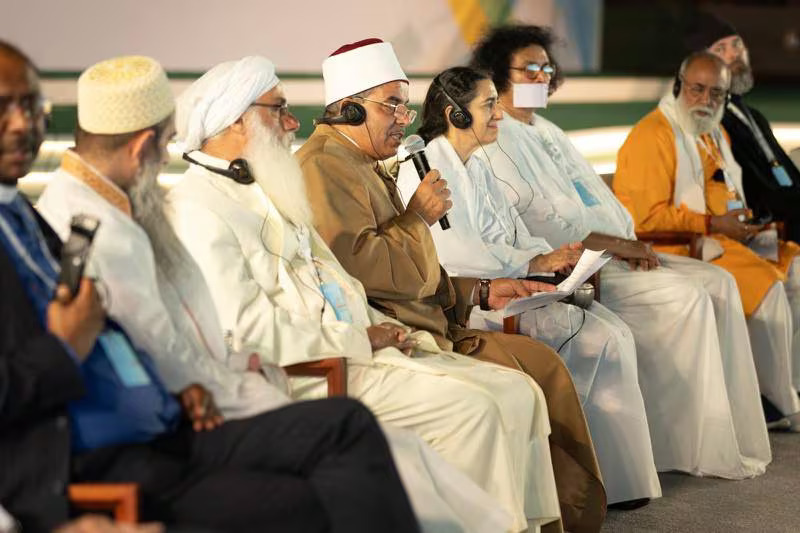
The Faith leaders addressing the summit to fight climate crisis.

Ahead of the COP28 summit between political leaders of the world, the Muslim Council of Elders in partnership with the COP28 Presidency, the United Nations Environment Programme, and the Catholic Church, and under the patronage of the UAE’s President Sheikh Mohamed bin Zayed Al-Nahyan, organized a Global Faith Leaders Summit convening 28 faith leaders to address climate change. The two-day summit, held on 6 - 7 November 2023, was hosted in Abu Dhabi gathering different faith leaders with climate experts to fight climate change.

== Proceedings ==
The summit was attended by Sheikh Nahyan bin Mubarak, Minister of Tolerance and Coexistence, and Dr Sultan Al Jaber, COP28 President-designate and Minister of Industry and Advanced Technology. Muslim, Jewish, Buddhist, Sikh, and Hindu leaders, along with representatives of other major religious traditions, joined in the appeal, to sign the Confluence of Conscience: Uniting for Planetary Resurgence. This document commits to addressing climate change and raising climate ambitions ahead of COP28, held in Dubai from 30 November to 12 December 2023. All leaders in the summit walked a path representing the equator and performed planting of a ghaf tree – the national tree of the UAE – before signing the document, known as the "Abu Dhabi Interfaith Statement", and addressing the audience.

== Attendees ==
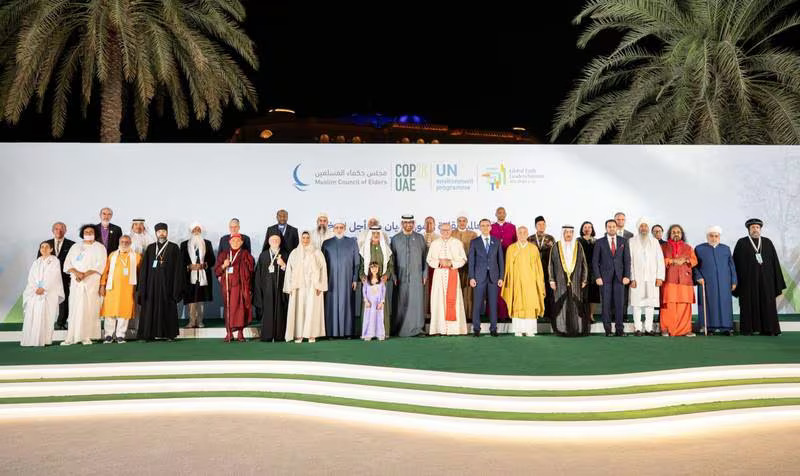
The 28 Global Faith leaders gathered in Abu Dhabi for the COP28 summit.

The 28 faith leaders who attended this summit and signed the Statement are:

1. Professor Mohamed Al-Duwaini, Deputy of Al-Azhar Al-Sharif, representing the Grand Imam of Al-Azhar Ahmed Al-Tayeb
2. Cardinal Pietro Parolin, Vatican Secretary of State, representing Pope Francis
3. Husain Burhanuddin, representing Syedna Mufaddal Saifuddin, Sultan of the Dawoodi Bohra Community
4. Shinkai Kori, Chief High Priest Of Nenbutsushu Sampozan Muryojuji Temple
5. Patriarch Bartholomew The First, Ecumenical Patriarch Of Constantinople
6. Maulen Ashimbayev, Head of the Congress of Leaders of World and Traditional Religions
7. Dharma Master Hsin Tao, Founder of the Ling Jiou Mountain Buddhist Society
8. Father Grigoriy Matrusov, representing Patriarch Kirill, Patriarch of Moscow and all Rus'
9. Satpal Singh Khalsa, Head of the Religious and Spiritual Authority for the Sikh Religion in the Western Hemisphere
10. Mahabrahmarishi Shri Kumar Swami, President of the World Humanity Parliament
11. Swami Amritaswarupananda, Head Disciple of Sri Mata Amritanandamayi Devi
12. Acharya Lokesh Muni, Founder of the Vishwa Shanti Kendra
13. Sheikh-Ul Islam Allahshukur Pashazadeh, Grand Mufti of the Caucasus
14. Sister Maureen Goodman, Director of Brahma Kumaris in the United Kingdom
15. General Bishop Anba Ermia, President of The Coptic Orthodox Cultural Center
16. Sheikh Rishama Sattar Jabar Hilo, Head of the Mandean-Sabeans in Iraq and the World
17. Archbishop Julio Murry of the Anglican Church of Central America, representing Justin Welby, Archbishop of Canterbury
18. Mor Ignatius Aphrem The Second, Patriarch of Antioch and all the East
19. Reverend Jerry Pillay, General Secretary of the World Council of Churches
20. Doctor Mohammed Cholil Nafis, President of the Indonesian Ulema Council
21. Rabbi Moshe Lewin, Vice President of the Conference Of European Rabbis
22. Bani Dugal, Principal Representative of the Baha'i International Community
23. Mohinder Singh Ahluwalia, Leader of Guru Nanak Nishkam Sewak Jatha
24. Chief Rabbi David Rosen, International President of Religions for Peace
25. Dr. Salem Bin Mohammed Al Malik, Director General of The Islamic World Educational, Scientific, And Cultural Organization
26. Bishop Thomas Schirrmacher, Secretary-General of the World Evangelical Alliance
27. Debra Boudreaux, CEO of the Buddhist Tzu Chi Foundation
28. Tokita Hozumi representing Rev. Kōō Okada Spiritual Guide of Sukyo Mahikari

== Faith Pavilion ==
During the COP28 summit in the month of December, a Faith Pavilion will be hosted by Muslim Council of Elders, in cooperation with COP28, United Nations Environment Programme, and a Coalition of over 70 organizations. This pavilion will allow religious leaders to launch initiatives and present ideas that will help different nations and people fight climate change.
