= Bawa Jain =

Indian religious advocate

Bawa Jain (born Preminder Nath Jain February 16, 1957) is an Indian advocate for interfaith dialogue.

Jain was secretary-general of the Millennium Peace Summit of Religious and Spiritual Leaders held in New York City in 2000.

Jain co-founded the Religious Initiative of the World Economic Forum, and is the creator of the Gandhi–King Award for Non-Violence. He launched the World Council of Religious Leaders (WCORL) Religion One on One Initiative.

== United Nations activities ==
Bawa Jain was responsible for commencing the opening of the United Nations General Assembly during their Annual Interfaith Services in New York from 1998 – 1999. During his time at the UN, Jain founded the World Movement for Nonviolence in January 1998. As founder of The World Movement for Nonviolence, he conceived The Gandhi-King Award, which honors those who exemplify the lives and legacies of Mahatma Gandhi and Martin Luther King. Past recipients include former United Nations Secretary General Kofi Annan, President Nelson Mandela, Dame Jane Goodall, Mata Amritanandamayi and President Mwai Kibaki. Jain was a founding co-chair of the Values Caucus. This caucus was founded in anticipation of the World Summit for Social Development held in Copenhagen in 1995. After the World Summit for Social Development, Jain became an initiator and co-chair alongside Bella Abzug to create the Coalition of the Caucuses which followed in depth involvement with the U.N. World Summit for Social Development in order to promote unity.

== Recent activities ==
Jain founded The Centre for Responsible Leadership, “a global initiative to mobilize people of influence who have and are willing to make decisions that seek to be in the larger interests of all, rather than to benefit a few.” One of the first initiatives was the convening of a “Sustainable Development Leadership Summit” at the United Nations in early 2019.

The Centre for Responsible Leadership co-hosted an international event with John’s Hopkins and the Clinton Foundation dealing with the current overdose crisis: "Bridging Faith and Science to Combat the Overdose Crisis: Finding solutions to the opioid epidemic at the intersection of religious faith and science."

Jain was a featured speaker at the September 2021 Tedx Talks USF where he spoke on “Restoring Civility to Public Discourse.

Jain was a featured speaker at the May 2025 TEDxTampa event

Jain recently organized an inter-faith meeting, that was largely condemned, that included the R.S.S leader Mohan Bhagwat
