= Santi Simone e Giuda, Mantua =

Roman Catholic church in Lombardy, Italy

Santi Simone e Giuda
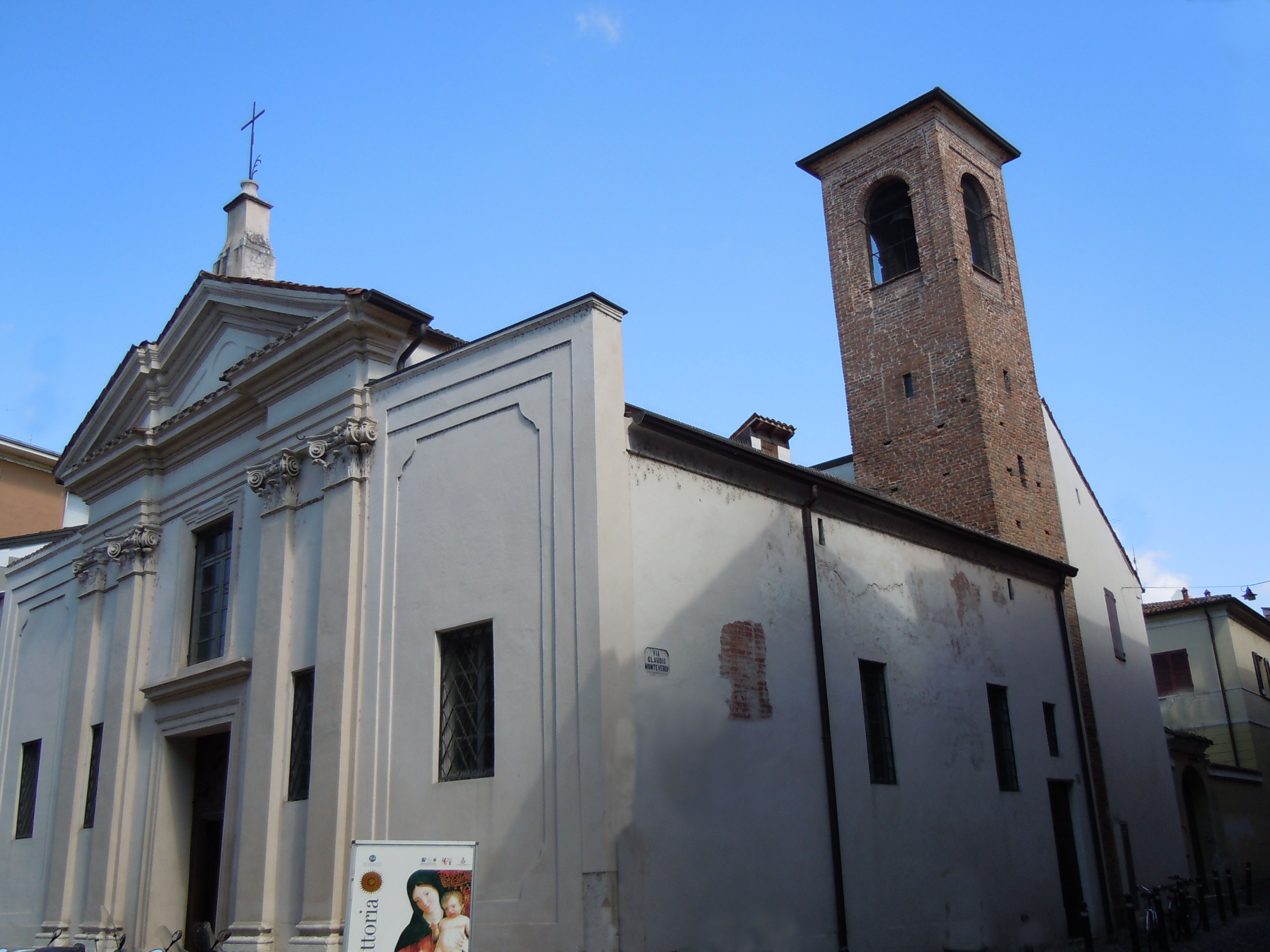

Religion
- Affiliation: Roman Catholic

Location
- Location: Mantua, Italy
- Interactive map of Santi Simone e Giuda
- Coordinates: 45.1604°N 10.7914°E

Architecture
- Type: Church
- Completed: 18th century

Santi Simone e Giuda is a Renaissance architecture, Roman Catholic church located in Mantua, region of Lombardy, Italy. The church rises near the Palazzo d'Arco and the Church of the Fillipines in Mantua.

== History ==
A church at the site was likely present by the year 1000, but it was rebuilt in 1593, 1775, and finally in the first half of the 19th century. Initially it had its own parish, in 1805 it was suppressed and joined to that of Sant'Andrea. In this church on 20 May 1599, the music composer Claudio Monteverdi wed Claudia Cattaneo. Inside the church is a memorial plaque, placed in 1914 by Douglas Crichton, recalling his Scottish ancestor James Crichton (1560-1582), known informally as The Admirable Crichton. James Crichton was a young polymath, who was murdered in unusual circumstances at the age of 21 years by the jealous son of the Duke of Mantua, Guglielmo Gonzaga, Vincenzo.

A guide from 1833 recalls a work by Borgani, depicting St Anselm blessing the church of St Paul del paese dei Due Castelli.
