= Museum of World Religions =

Museum in Yonghe, New Taipei, Taiwan

- 世界宗教博物館
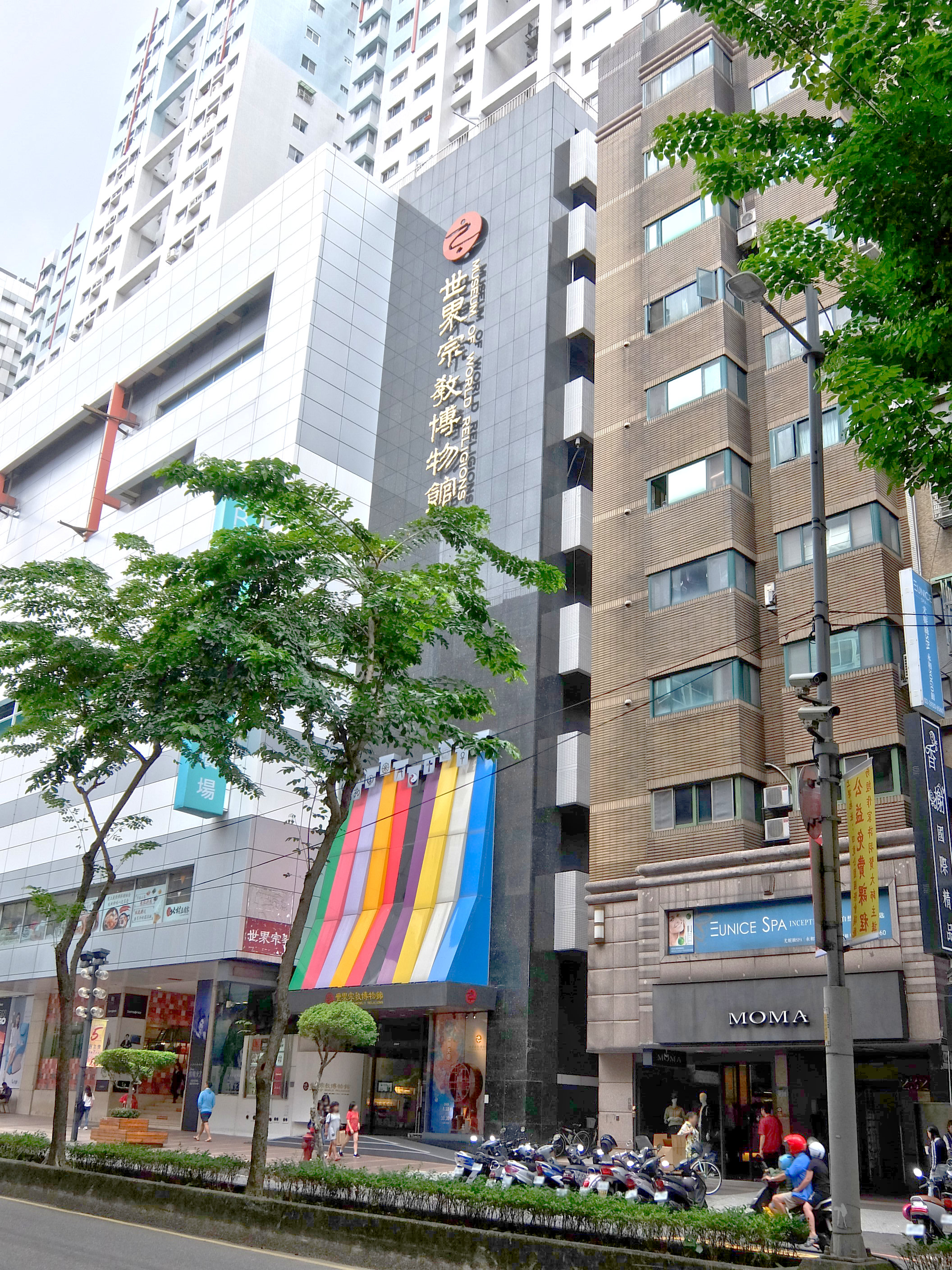
- Established: 2001
- Location: Yonghe, New Taipei, Taiwan
- Coordinates: 25°00′28.8″N 121°30′28.0″E
- Type: museum
- Founder: Dharma Master Hsin Tao
- Curator: Ma Yu-chuan
- Public transit access: Yongan Market Station
- Website: Official website

The Museum of World Religions (MWR; traditional Chinese: 世界宗教博物館; simplified Chinese: 世界宗教博物馆; pinyin: Shìjiè Zōngjiào Bówùguǎn) is a museum in Yonghe District, New Taipei, Taiwan.

== History ==
The museum was founded in November 2001 by Venerable Hsin Tao (心道), a Buddhist monk, and set up through the Ling Jiou Mountain Buddhist Foundation. Further elaborate opening ceremonies were held in September and November 2002 with many religious leaders and others from around the world, including the President Chen Shui-bian. The Taiwanese architect and educator Han Pao-teh was the first curator. In February 2003, an interactive multimedia was installed at the Hall of Life Travel.

== Architecture ==
The museum building was designed by Ralph Appelbaum Associates, the designer of major American museums including the United States Holocaust Memorial Museum in Washington DC and the expansion of the Hayden Planetarium at the American Museum of Natural History in New York City.

== Exhibitions ==
The museum presents exhibits on ten different major world religions. It also features a model called "Avatamsaka World" illustrating the Avatamsaka Sutra.

== Transportation ==
The museum is accessible within walking distance North West from Yongan Market Station of the Taipei Metro.

== See also ==
- List of museums in Taiwan
- Buddhism in Taiwan
