= Santi Simone e Giuda Taddeo a Torre Angela =

- Church of Saints Simon and Judas Thaddeus at Torre Angela
- Parrocchia Santi Simone e Giuda Taddeo a Torre Angela
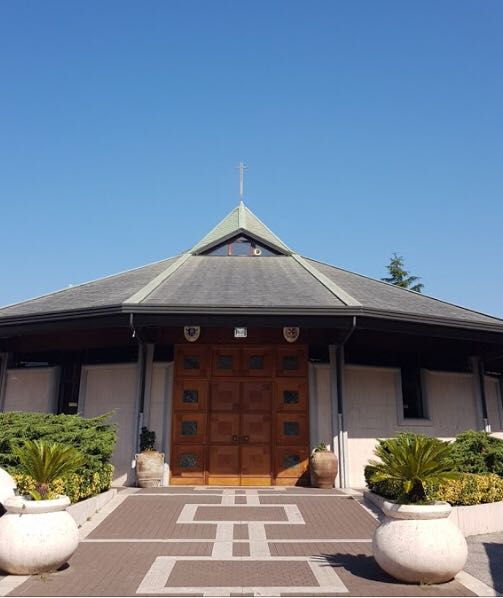
- Click on the map for a fullscreen view
- 41.8750°N 12.6202°E
- Location: Via di Torrenova 162, Rome
- Country: Italy
- Language: Italian
- Denomination: Catholic
- Tradition: Roman Rite
- Website: www.facebook.com/simoneegiudataddeo/

History
- Status: titular church
- Founded: 1992
- Dedication: Simon the Zealot and Judas Thaddeus

Architecture
- Architect(s): Francesco da Volterra, Carlo Lombardi
- Style: Modern
- Completed: 1992

Administration
- Diocese: Rome

Santi Simone e Giuda Taddeo a Torre Angela is a modern parish church and a titular church that can be assigned to cardinal priests in the papal diocese of Rome.

== Church ==
The church is dedicated to Saints Simon and Jude, apostles of Christ, located at Via di Torrenova 162.

It was built on 20 December 1992 for a parish that was established on 4 April 1961.

It enjoyed a papal visit from Pope John Paul II on 30 October 1988.

== Cardinal priests ==
- Pietro Parolin (22 February 2014 – present); co-opted to suburbicarian rank on 28 June 2018
