= Hsin Tao =

Buddhist monk

Hsin Tao 心道
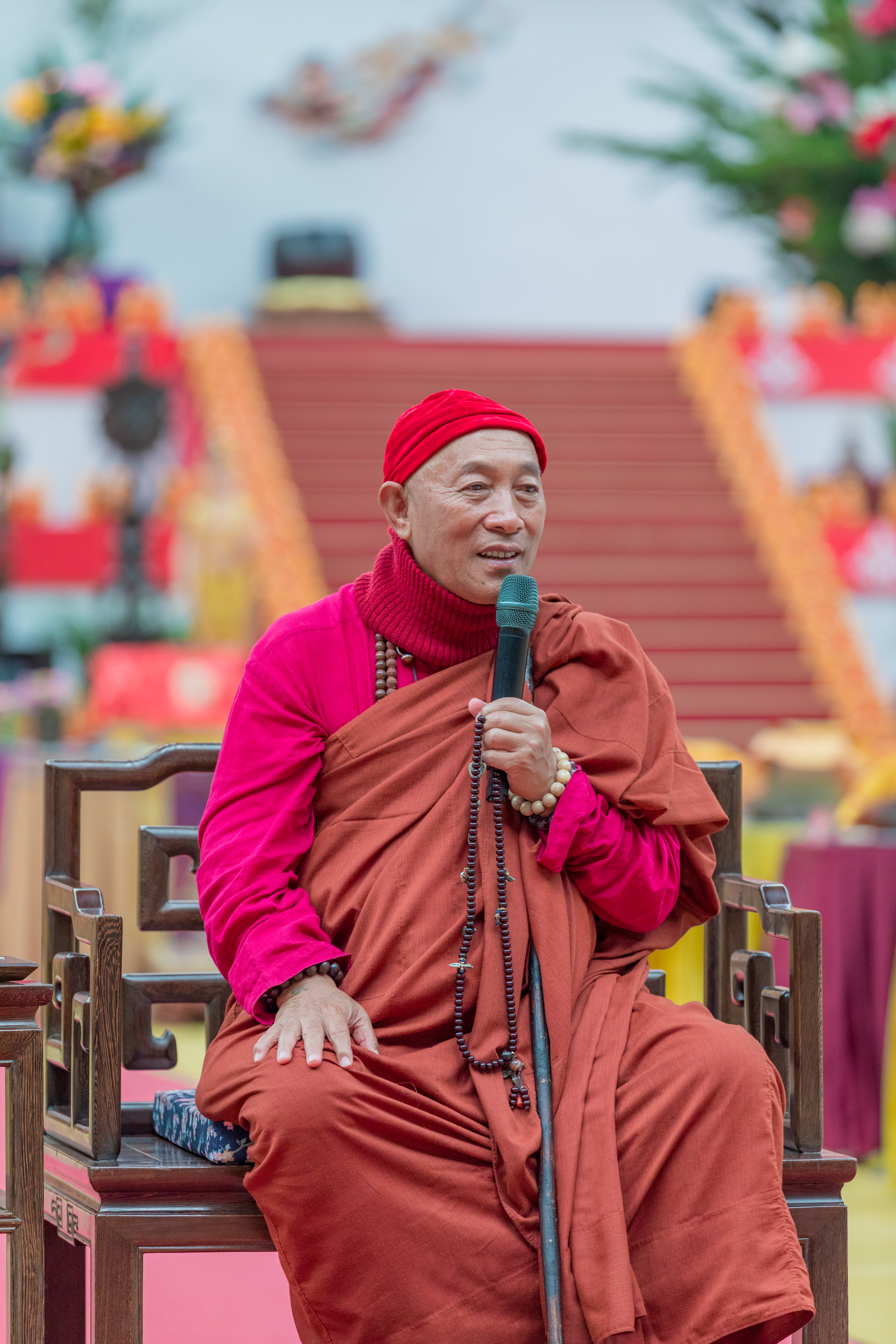
- Title: Dharma Master; Ashin (အရှင်)

Personal life
- Born: Yang Jinsheng; 1948 (age 77–78) Lashio, Myanmar

Religious life
- Religion: Buddhism

Senior posting
- Teacher: Hsing Yun

Ashin Shih Hsin Tao (Chinese: 心道; pinyin: Xīndào; born October 11, 1948) is a Burmese-born Taiwanese Buddhist monk from Linji School (Chan Buddhism), and the founder of the Ling Jiou Mountain Buddhist Society (LJM). He also founded the Museum of World Religions (MWR) and the NGO initiative ‘Global Family for Love & Peace’ (GFLP).

== Biography ==
=== Early years ===
Hsin Tao was born as Yang Hsiao-sheng (楊小生) in 1948 in Laikan Village, Laidaoshan Region, Lashio, Myanmar, to ethnic Chinese parents from the Yunnan province in China.

His father Yang Hsiao-cai was killed in 1952 and his mother Li Shu-jen went missing with his younger sister Yang Hsiao-; they were never heard from again. War-orphaned at the age of 4, Yang was first raised by his aunt Yang Hsiao-Si, who died shortly after, and his uncle-in-law Yin Hu-Nan took him along into the mountains as homeless until 1957, when Uncle Yin’s buddy army officer Lu Ding-Zhou encouraged the 9-year-old boy to join the guerilla army to have access to learning. His given name was changed to Yang Jian-Sheng but misspelled as Yang Jin-Sheng (Chinese: 楊進生) for formalities.

Yang was with the Solitary Army which retreated to Taiwan in 1961 and was enrolled in the Company of Youngster Soldiers stationed in the Chengkungling Army Training Center. He was admitted to the Hsin-Hsing Elementary School of Tan-zi Township in Taichung in early 1963 but later started schooling at the Yuan-Shu-Lin Elementary School in Da-si Township, Taoyuan, when the army base was moved to Taoyuan.

=== Spiritual journey ===
Yang heard the name of Bodhisattva Guanyin in 1963. Yang began to chant the Great Compassion Mantra, reciting the Universal Gate Chapter of the Lotus Sutra and reading Buddha's life stories. He took refuge in Bodhisattva Guanyin.

Yang passed the examination for admission to the Long-Tan Vocational School of Agriculture in Taoyuan in 1964 but transferred to the Guan-Hsi Junior High School in Hsinchu in 1965. He was nicknamed Jai-Gong (Ol' Vegan) for being a vegetarian and came into contact with Yiguandao preacher Hsieh Feng-Ying for help and support and the latter's religious teachings. In 1966, Yang passed the examination for admission to the First Academy for Army Sergeants in Lung-Gang, Zhong-Li, Taoyuan. In 1968 he received a formal order of discharge from the army and a long period of short-lived, temp jobs followed when he earned his living as a handyman, a delivery boy, a tea-factory worker, even a grocery clerk selling rice. Job-hopping afforded him a glimpse into different walks of life alongside a host of different faiths ranging from Taoism, folklore cults, to Confucianism. The death of Li eng-Chun in 1972 sharpened his sense of impermanence. Yang realized that life is all about suffering, making his mind up to become a monk.

On September 19 of the lunar calendar in 1973 which coincided with the Renunciation Day of Bodhisattva Guanyin, Yang was shaved to become a monk with the blessing of Master Hsing Yun of the Fo Guang Shan Monastery . He was given the Dharma name 'Hsin Tao' and a courtesy name 'Huei Zhong'. Yang was admitted to the Fo Guang Shan Tsung Lin University. The same year also saw him receive precepts at the Fa-Yun Temple in Miao-Li. Taking leave of absence from the Fo Guang Shan in August 1974, he went to stay in solitude at an idled greenhouse for orchids owned by Master Yuan Guang in Wai-Shuang-Xi (Chinese: 外雙溪), Taipei. The solitary retreat was meant to help concentrate on the practice of 12 Dhutangas, a set of ascetic practices taught in Buddhism aiming at helping the practitioner to develop detachment with material things including the body.

Under an arrangement facilitated by Hsing Yun, Hsin Tao went to the Lei Yin Temple in Yi-Lan for practice in retreat in late February 1975. Then moved to the venue designated was the Yuan Ming Temple at the Er-Jie Village of Jiao-Xi in Yi-Lan for deeper practice. A major overhaul for the Yuan Ming Temple went underway in 1977. Master Hsin Tao relocated to the Ling Shan Pagoda about 100 meters away.

In 1979, Hsin Tao relocated his place of stay for the practice of solitary meditation to the mountain slope next to the Long Tan Lake (Chinese:龍潭湖 ) in Yi-Lan. The place was named the 'Illusion-like Mountain Dwelling' as a paraphrase to the notion that "impermanence of life & death is comparable to dreams and illusions". That was where Master Hsin Tao began his third charnel-ground-dweller's practice, spending nights and an 18-hour average daily practice of meditation for four years.

Hsin Tao began his fasting retreat in early April, 1983. He continued by relocating to a historic site nearby two weeks later. He relocated again in June and practiced fasting retreat for over three months in a cave at the Gong-Nan Temple in Fulong, New Taipei City. On September 21 that coincided with the lunar Moon Festival that year, a final relocation saw the site change to the Fa-Hwa Cave (Chinese: 法華洞) on the premises where the LJM is now located.

=== Dharma Propagation ===
The LJM was launched on the Moon Festival on September 21, 1983. The main hall of the Monastery was inaugurated on June 19 of the lunar calendar in 1984. The name of the temple is "Wu Sheng Monastery" (Chinese: 無生道場), to promote Buddha's teachings and social and cultural activities for educational purposes. The Master internalized 'Practice of Compassion and Chan Meditation' as the LJM tradition, encouraging disciples to follow the daily meditation practice on life and routine at work.

Hsin Tao led the Four Groups of Buddhist disciples and followers to initiate the first LJM Water-Land-Air Dharma Assembly in Taichung in 1994.The LJM tradition was thus cemented to continue over time uninterrupted and the 29th annual Dharma Assembly in 2022 was just as solemn and spectacular as a LJM signature offering in spite of the pandemic.

=== Founding the Museum of World Religions(MWR) ===
Hsin Tao announced the Preparatory Office for the Museum of World Religions (MWR) in 1990. The Development Foundation of MWR was established in 1994 to help expedite the project. After more than a decade of dedicated work, the MWR was inaugurated on November 9, 2001, with its Opening Date officially marked as the LJM World Religions’ Day of Harmony.

=== Launching Long-term International Campaigns for World Peace ===
In 1996, Hsin Tao visited Turkey and Israel to meet with religious representatives of Islam, Judaism, and the Bahá'í Faith and delivered speeches. He went to Thailand the same year to attend the Asian Conference on Religion & Peace (ACRP).

In 1999, Hsin Tao was invited to attend the third Parliament of the World's Religions (PoWR) in Capetown, South Africa, for the first time and delivered two speeches, "Spiritual Challenges Facing the New Millennium" and "Buddhism in the 21st Century". He also played an engaging panelist for interactions with an international audience on the topics of religion and world peace. Hsin Tao has attended all the PoWR congregations from the 4th to the 8th Conference.

Hsin Tao was invited by the United Nations to the "Millennium Peace Summit of Religious & Spiritual Leaders" in 2000 to deliver a prayer. He was later invited to get involved with the UN Interfaith Peace Corps.

In 2002, Hsin Tao founded the New York-based NGO initiative 'Global Family of Love & Peace' (GFLP). In the same year the first Muslim-Buddhist Dialogue was held at the campus of Columbia University in the United States. From there onwards and over the span of two decades, the interfaith dialogue has been going on in European, Asian, and African metropolises including Jakarta, Paris, Teheran, Barcelona, Morocco, Beijing and Taipei. The 17th Muslim-Buddhist Dialogue with an added feature of the second Muslim-Buddhist Dialogue of the Youth in 2021 zoomed in on the theme "Actions Recommended for Spiritual Ecology".

In 2004, Hsin Tao gave a speech on "Global Ethics & World Peace Are Religion’s Duty Now" at the international conference titled "Spirituality & Sustainability of Ecology: Water as Our Common Origin" co-organized by the Museum of World Religions, Goldin Institute for Partnership and Peace, and the City Government of Taipei.

He is also interested in interfaith dialogue, sitting on the Board of World Religious Leaders for the Elijah Interfaith Institute. Hsin Tao then traveled to Reykjavik, Iceland, to attend the second Spirit of Humanity Forum and address the importance of Love & Compassion in 2014.

Hsin Tao visited Vienna, Austria, in 2016 to share his interfaith experiences by speaking on “Loving the Earth, Loving Peace” at the KAICIID Dialogue Center.

In 2017, Hsin Tao made a visit to the Vatican to meet Pope Francis, and extended a personal invitation to the Pope to endorse the LJM peace campaign "Loving the Earth, Loving Peace". Hsin Tao instructed the LJM to co-work and curate the sixth International Symposium on Buddhist-Christian Dialogue with the theme of "Buddhists and Christians Walk Together Side-by-Side to Stop Violence" the same year.

Hsin Tao led the LJM in 2021 to participate in the teleconference series of “Faith and Science: towards COP26” co-organized by the Vatican, the UK, and the Italian Embassy to the Vatican. The telecon series was designed as an interfaith contribution to the COP26 Summit in Glasgow in late 2021.

In 2023, Hsin Tao attended Global Faith Leaders COP28 Summit, served as one of the six speakers to represent Buddhist leaders at the signing ceremony. He stated that the common bond among religions is spirituality, the foundation that allows different faiths to unite and work together to save the environment.

=== Education, culture, and charity ===
The LJM Prajina Cultural Foundation was established in 1989. The LJM Dharmapalas Association was set up in 1990, and the LJM Charity Foundation came into operation in 1994. In 2003, Hsin Tao founded the Triyana Buddhist Academy. For followers in the general public in 2014, the LJM launched the four-phase Buddhist education based on interpreting Buddha’s teachings with Hsin Tao's Dharma realization.

For the overall health of the Earth ecology, sustainability of life and awakening of spiritual ecology, Master Hsin Tao has since long been planning to found the University for Life & Peace (ULP) in Myanmar.

== See also ==
- Buddhism in Taiwan
- Elijah Interfaith Institute
