= Santi Simone e Giuda, Spoleto =

Church in Spoleto, Italy

Coordinates: 42.733794°N 12.739261°E

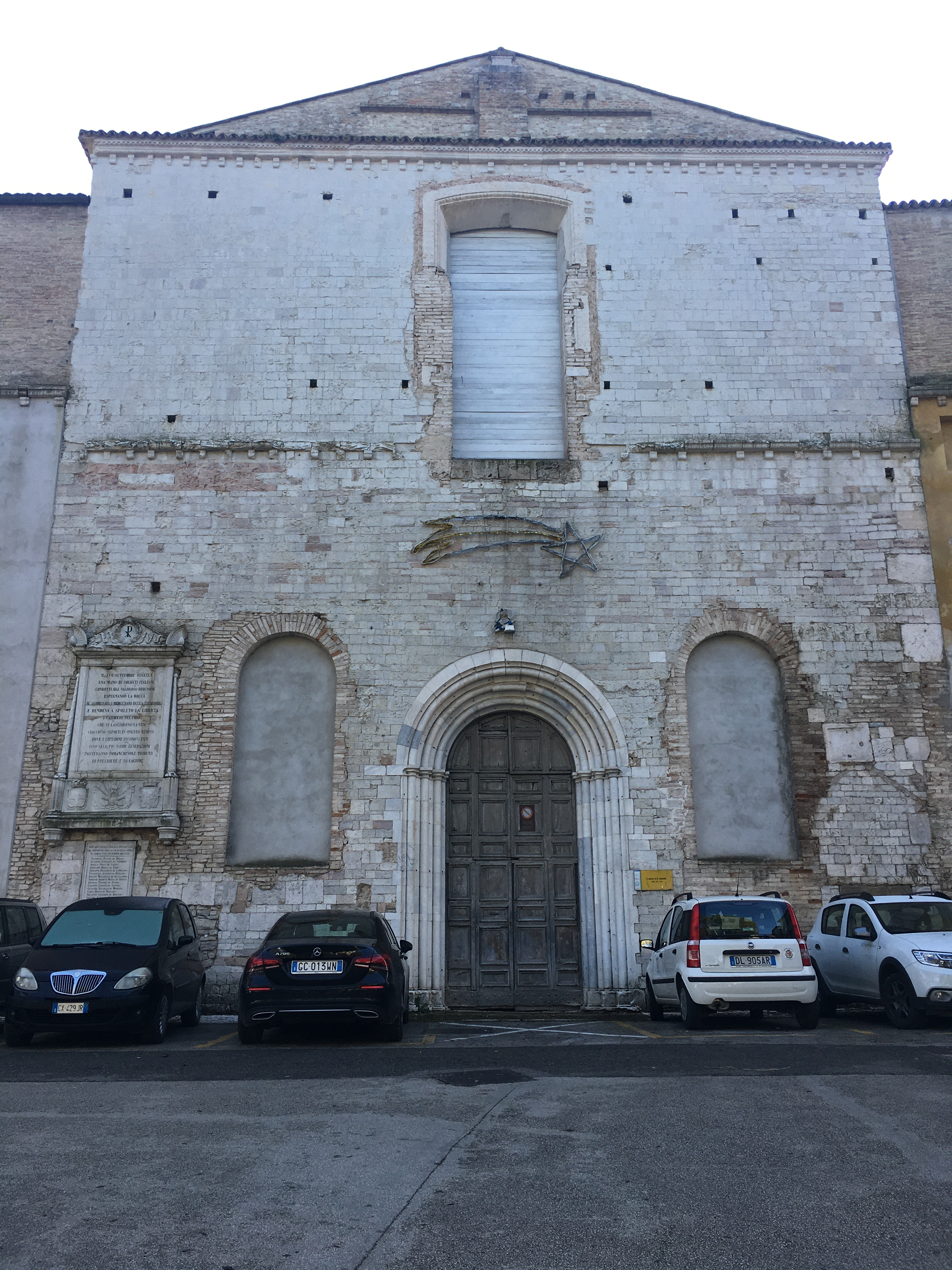
facade of church with Gothic-Romanesque portal

Santi Simone e Giuda is a Gothic-romanesque-style, deconsecrated Roman Catholic church located on Via Brignoni #40 in Spoleto, Province of Perugia, Umbria, Italy. It was built in the 13th century as a Franciscan church and adjacent convent.

== History and description ==
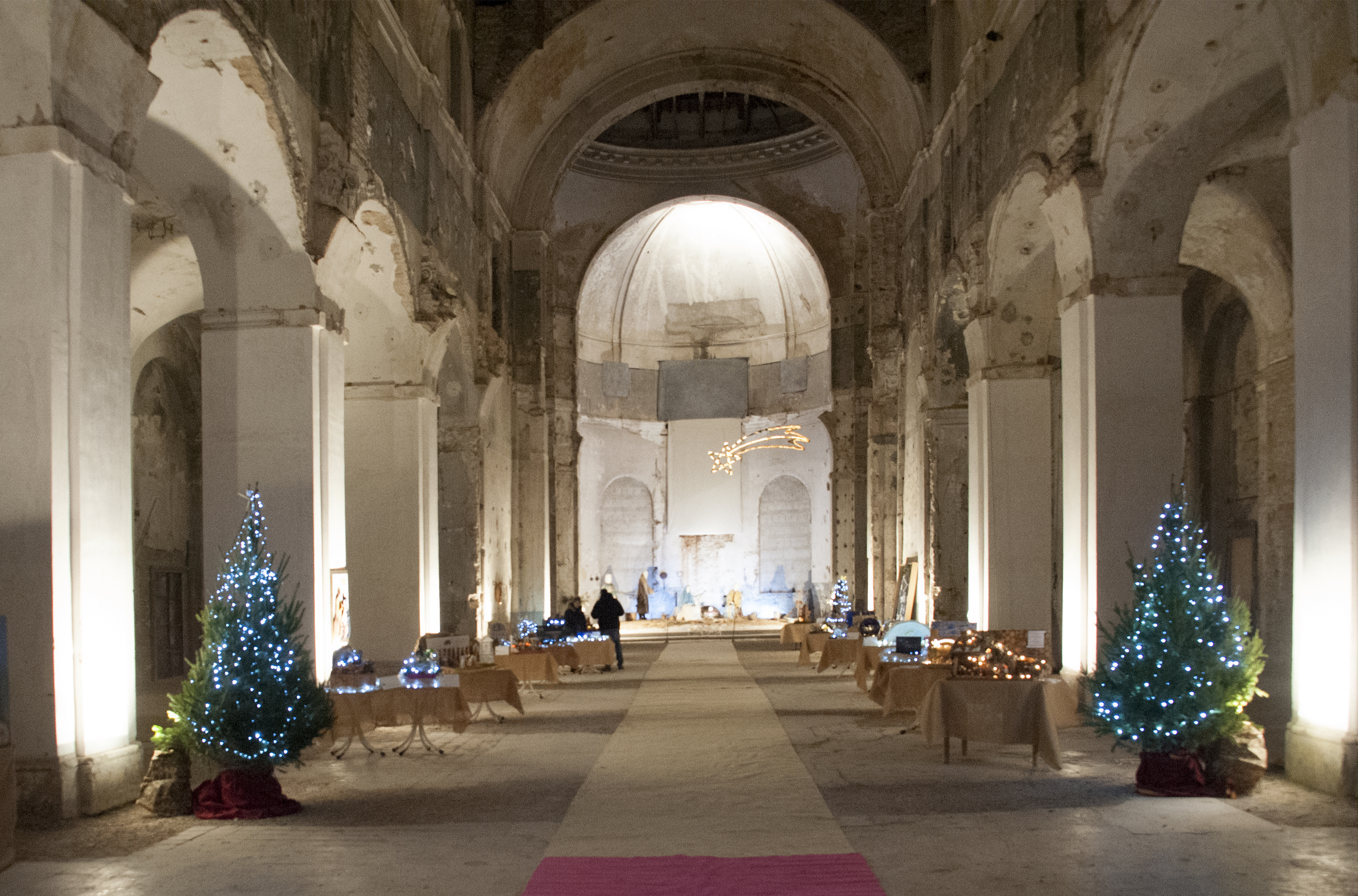
Nave of the deconsecrated church

The Franciscan order had grown in popularity since the death of St Francis in 1226. Simone, a young man from a prominent family from the hamlet of Collazone near Todi, like St Francis before him, forsook his family's position and prestige to join the follower of St Francis. Simone was sent to proselytize in Germany and then to become Provincial Minister of the order in the Marches and later Umbria, under the guidance of Elias of Cortona (c.1183-1253), who was one of the Saint's original band of friars and after 1221 vicar general of the order of Friars Minor. Upon Simone's death in 1250, attributions of sanctity began to circulate. The Franciscans had by 1255 then achieved the canonization of at least four saints: Francis himself, Clare of Assisi, Elizabeth of Hungary, and Antony of Padua; the community of Spoleto who owned Simone's relics expected a similar elevation for him and begun construction of a larger church at this site in 1254 to house his relics, although dedicating the Church, transiently they thought, to the saints and apostles Simon and Jude (Simone e Giuda). But alas, despite the centuries, Simone da Collazone has never achieved sainthood, and thus the church remained dedicated to St Simon the Apostle. Simone's relics initially moved in the 19th-century to the Duomo, now reside in Sant'Ansano.

The structures were completed in 1280 under the guidance of Fra Filippo da Campello, and have undergone many restorations and losses over the centuries. The plain white-stone facade remains unfinished and the windows were walled. A plaque on the right side recalls the 17 September 1860 battle for Spoleto between the victorious Savoyard forces led by General Filippo Brignone used artillery to force the surrender, within a day, of the multinational Papal army of Irish, Austrian, Franco-Belgians, Swiss-Germans and Italians, led by the Irish brigade leader Major Myles O’Reilly and occupying the adjacent Rocca Albornoziana.

The monastic building was converted into barracks in 1863. The 16th-century frescoes depicting the Life of St Antony of Padua in the cloister are nearly completely covered over. In 1893, the buildings became an orphanage. The interiors preserve little of the original decoration.
