= Schiavon =

Schiavon S-ciaon (Venetian)
- Comune
- Comune di Schiavon
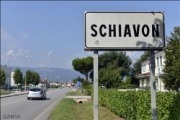
- Schiavon Entrance

- Location within Italy Location within Veneto
- Coordinates: 45°42′N 11°39′E
- Country: Italy
- Region: Veneto
- Province: Vicenza (VI)
- Frazioni: Longa

Area
  - Total: 11.96 km^{2} (4.62 sq mi)
- Elevation: 74 m (243 ft)

Population (28 February 2007)
  - Total: 2,535
  - Density: 212.0/km^{2} (549.0/sq mi)
- Demonym: Schiavonensi
- Time zone: UTC+1 (CET)
  - Summer (DST): UTC+2 (CEST)
- Postal code: 36060
- Dialing code: 0444
- ISTAT code: 024099
- Patron saint: Isidore of Seville
- Saint day: 15 May
- Website: Official website

Schiavon (Italian: [skjaˈvon]; Venetian: S-ciaon [stʃaˈoŋ]) is a town and comune (municipality) in the province of Vicenza, Veneto, Italy. SP248 goes through the town. The Poli Grappa Museum is found at the Poli Distillerie in Schiavon.[2][3] It is a museum showcasing the history of Grappa and the process of distilling the spirit.[1]

== Twin towns ==
Schiavon is twinned with:

- Monte Belo do Sul, Brazil
