= Pope John XXIII =

Head of the Catholic Church from 1958 to 1963

Pope Saint John XXIII
- Bishop of Rome
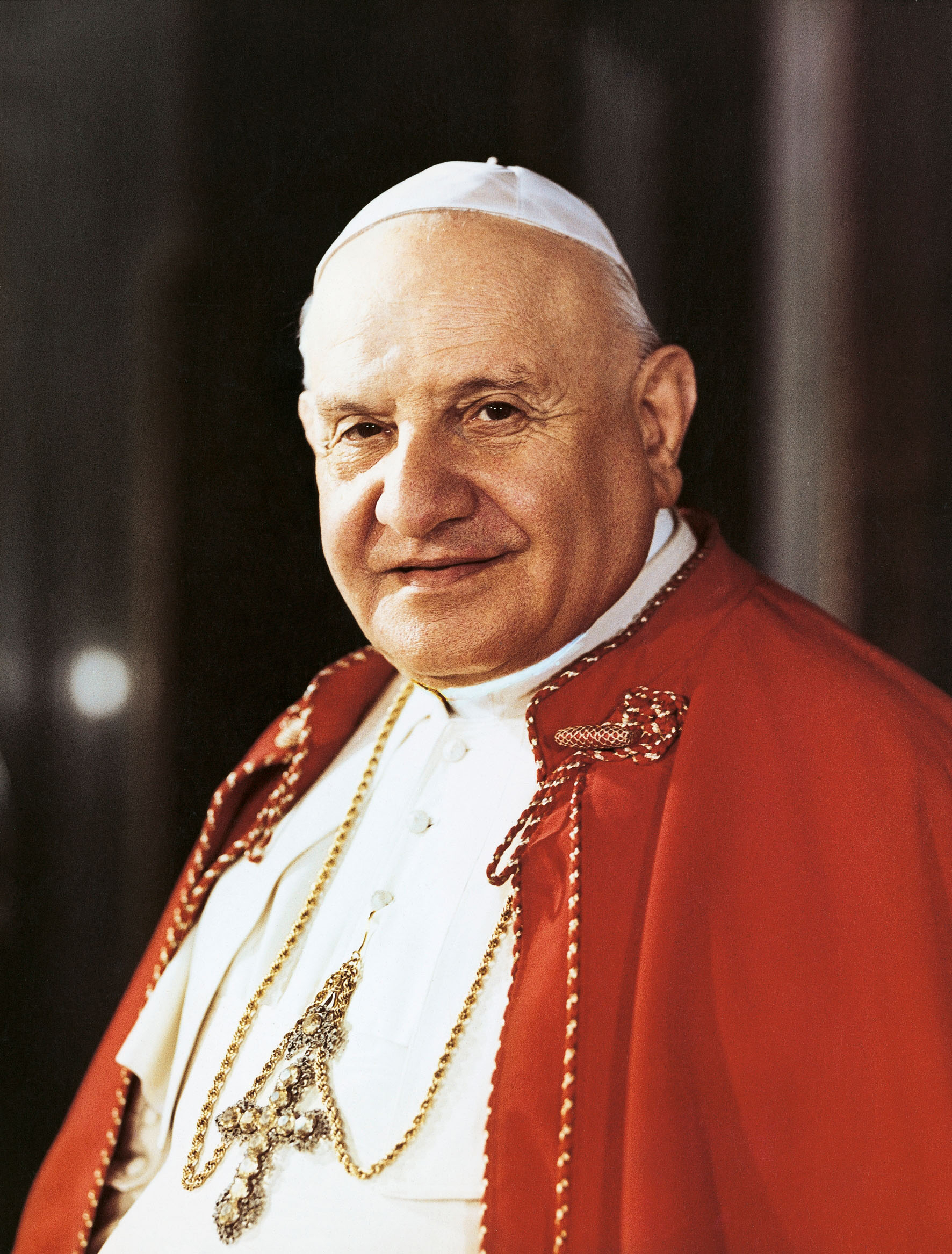
- John XXIII, c. 1958–63
- Church: Catholic Church
- Papacy began: 28 October 1958
- Papacy ended: 3 June 1963
- Predecessor: Pius XII
- Successor: Paul VI
- Previous posts: Titular Archbishop of Areopolis (1925‍–‍1934); Apostolic Visitor to Bulgaria (1925‍–‍1931); Apostolic Delegate to Bulgaria (1931‍–‍1934); Titular Archbishop of Mesembria (1934‍–‍1953); Apostolic Delegate to Turkey (1934‍–‍1944); Apostolic Delegate to Greece (1934‍–‍1944); Apostolic Nuncio to France (1944‍–‍1953); Cardinal Priest of Santa Prisca (1953‍–‍1958); Patriarch of Venice (1953‍–‍1958)

Orders
- Ordination: 10 August 1904 by Giuseppe Ceppetelli
- Consecration: 19 March 1925 by Giovanni Tacci Porcelli
- Created cardinal: 12 January 1953 by Pius XII
- Rank: Cardinal priest

Personal details
- Born: Angelo Giuseppe Roncalli; 25 November 1881 Sotto il Monte, Italy
- Died: 3 June 1963 (aged 81) Apostolic Palace, Vatican City
- Buried: Altar of St. Jerome, St. Peter's Basilica
- Education: Pontifical Roman Athenaeum Saint Apollinare (ThD); Pontifical Roman Major Seminary (JCD)
- Motto: Obedientia et pax (Latin for 'Obedience and peace')
- Signature: John XXIII's signature

- Coat of arms: John XXIII's coat of arms

Sainthood
- Feast day: 11 October (Catholic Church); 3 June (Evangelical Lutheran Church in America, Anglican Church of Australia, Reformed Anglican Church); 4 June (Episcopal Anglican Church of Brazil, Anglican Church of Canada, Scottish Episcopal Church, Episcopal Church (USA))
- Venerated in: Catholic Church; Evangelical Lutheran Church in America; Anglican Church; Reformed Anglican Church (Calvinistic Anglican); Palmarian Church
- Beatified: 3 September 2000; St. Peter's Square, Vatican City by Pope John Paul II
- Canonized: 27 April 2014; St. Peter's Square, Vatican City by Pope Francis
- Attributes: Papal tiara; Papal vestments; Camauro
- Patronage: Papal delegates; Second Vatican Council; Patriarchate of Venice; Christian unity; Diocese of Bergamo; Sotto il Monte; Valsamoggia; Italian Army

Ordination history
History
Priestly ordination
- Ordained by: Giuseppe Ceppetelli
- Date: 10 August 1904
- Place: Santa Maria in Montesanto, Rome
Episcopal consecration
- Principal consecrator: Giovanni Tacci Porcelli
- Co-consecrators: Giuseppe Palica; Francesco Marchetti Selvaggiani
- Date: 19 March 1925
- Place: Sant'Ambrogio e Carlo al Corso, Rome
Cardinalate
- Elevated by: Pope Pius XII
- Date: 12 January 1953
Episcopal succession
Bishops consecrated by Pope John XXIII as principal consecrator
- Antonio Gregorio Vuccino: 25 July 1937
- Alfredo Pacini: 11 June 1946
- Giacomo Testa: 26 August 1953
- Silvio Oddi: 27 September 1953
- Angelo Dell'Acqua: 27 December 1958
- Albino Luciani: 27 December 1958
- Domenico Tardini: 27 December 1958
- Charles Msakila: 27 December 1958
- James Hagan: 8 May 1960
- Pericle Felici: 28 October 1960
- Alfredo Ottaviani: 19 April 1962
- Alberto di Jorio: 19 April 1962
- Augustin Bea: 19 April 1962
- Enrico Dante: 21 September 1962
- Pietro Palazzini: 21 September 1962
- Paul-Pierre Philippe: 21 September 1962
- Pope John XXIII's voice Message of Pope John XXIII at the inauguration of Brasília as the new capital of Brazil; Recorded 1960

Pope John XXIII (Note: Latin: Ioannes XXIII; Italian: Giovanni XXIII; in his native Bergamasque dialect: Gioàn XXIII [dʒoˈaɱ ˌʋintɛˈtri, - ˌʋen-].) (born Angelo Giuseppe Roncalli; (Note: Italian: [ˈandʒelo dʒuˈzɛppe roŋˈkalli]; Bergamasque: Àngel Giózep Roncàli [ˈandʒɛl ˈdʒozɛp roŋˈkali].) 25 November 1881 – 3 June 1963) was head of the Catholic Church and sovereign of Vatican City from 28 October 1958 until his death on 3 June 1963.

Roncalli was among 13 children born to Marianna Mazzola and Giovanni Battista Roncalli in a family of sharecroppers who lived in Sotto il Monte, a village in the province of Bergamo, Lombardy. He was ordained to the priesthood on 10 August 1904 and served in a number of posts, as nuncio in France and a delegate to Bulgaria, Greece and Turkey. In a consistory on 12 January 1953 Pope Pius XII made Roncalli a cardinal as the Cardinal-priest of Santa Prisca in addition to naming him as the Patriarch of Venice. Roncalli was unexpectedly elected pope on 28 October 1958 at age 76 after Pope Pius XII's death. Pope John XXIII surprised those who expected him to be a caretaker pope by calling the historic Second Vatican Council (1962–1965), the first session opening on 11 October 1962, which is now his feast.

John XXIII made many passionate speeches during his pontificate. His views on equality were summed up in his statement, "We were all made in God's image, and thus, we are all Godly alike." He made a major impact on the Catholic Church, opening it up to the changes of the Second Vatican Council and by his own dealings with other churches and nations. In Italian politics, he prohibited bishops from interfering with local elections, and he helped the Christian Democracy party to cooperate with the Italian Socialist Party. In international affairs, his Ostpolitik engaged in dialogue with the communist countries of Eastern Europe. He especially reached out to the Eastern Orthodox churches.

John XXIII's overall goal was to modernize the Church by emphasizing its pastoral role, and its necessary involvement with affairs of state. He dropped the traditional rule of 70 cardinals, increasing the number to 85. He used the opportunity to name the first cardinals from Africa, Japan, and the Philippines. He promoted ecumenical movements in cooperation with other Christian faiths. In doctrinal matters, he ended the practice of automatically formulating social and political policies on the basis of old theological propositions.

John XXIII did not live to see the Second Vatican Council to completion. He was diagnosed with stomach cancer in September 1962 and died on 3 June 1963. His cause for canonization was opened on 18 November 1965 by his successor, Pope Paul VI, who declared him a Servant of God. He was beatified by Pope John Paul II in 2000. On 5 July 2013, Pope Francis, bypassing the traditionally required second miracle, declared John XXIII a saint based on his virtuous lifestyle and because of the good that came from his opening of the Second Vatican Council. He was canonized alongside Pope Saint John Paul II on 27 April 2014. Pope Saint John XXIII today is affectionately known as "the Good Pope" (Italian: il papa buono).

== Early life ==
Angelo Giuseppe Roncalli was born on 25 November 1881 in Sotto il Monte, a small country village in the Bergamo province of the Lombardy region of Italy. He was the eldest son of Giovanni Battista Roncalli and his wife Marianna Giulia Mazzola, and fourth in a family of thirteen.

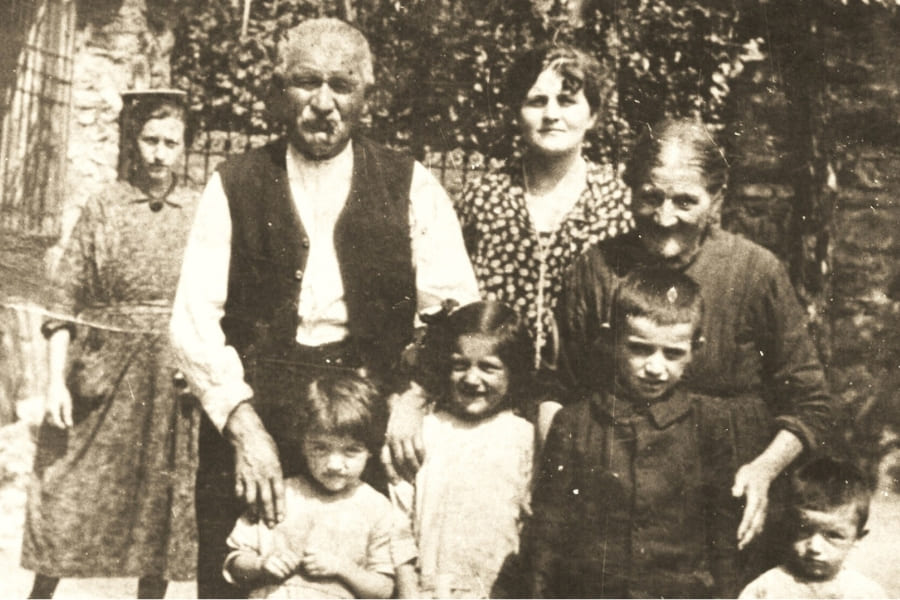
Roncalli's family, c. 1890

His family worked as sharecroppers, as did most of the people of Sotto il Monte – a striking contrast to that of his predecessor, Eugenio Pacelli (Pope Pius XII), who came from a family established in senior roles in the Papal administration. Roncalli was nonetheless a descendant of an Italian noble family, albeit from a secondary and impoverished branch; he "derived from no mean origins but from worthy and respected folk who can be traced right back to the beginning of the fifteenth century." The Roncallis maintained a vineyard and cornfields and kept cattle.

In 1889, Roncalli received both his First Communion and Confirmation at the age of 8.

On 1 March 1896, Luigi Isacchi, the spiritual director of his seminary, enrolled him into the Secular Franciscan Order. He professed his vows as a member of that order on 23 May 1897.

In 1904, Roncalli completed his doctorate in theology and was ordained a priest in the Church of Santa Maria in Montesanto in Piazza del Popolo in Rome on 10 August. Shortly after that, while still in Rome, Roncalli was taken to Saint Peter's Basilica to meet Pope Pius X. After this, he returned to his town to celebrate Mass for feast of the Assumption.

=== Priesthood ===
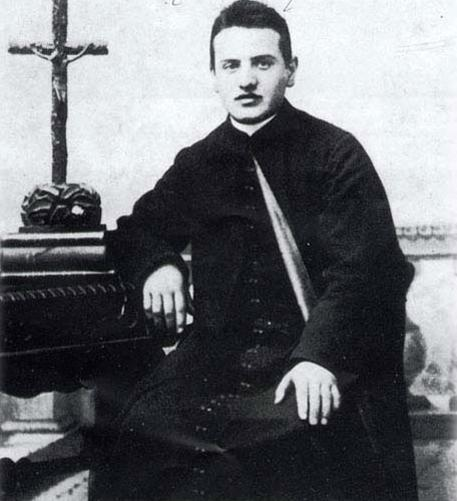
The young priest Roncalli

In 1905, Giacomo Radini-Tedeschi, the new Bishop of Bergamo, appointed Roncalli as his secretary. Roncalli worked for Radini-Tedeschi until the bishop's death on 22 August 1914, two days after the death of Pius X. Radini-Tedeschi's last words to Roncalli were "Angelo, pray for peace". Radini-Tedeschi's death had a deep effect on Roncalli. During this period Roncalli was also a lecturer in the diocesan seminary in Bergamo.

When Italy entered World War I in 1915, Roncalli was drafted into the Royal Italian Army as a sergeant, serving in the medical corps as a stretcher-bearer and as a chaplain. After being honorably discharged from the army in early 1919, he was named spiritual director of the seminary. On 7 May 1921, Roncalli was appointed a Domestic Prelate of His Holiness, which gave him the title of Monsignor. On 6 November, he travelled to Rome, where he met the Pope. After their meeting, Pope Benedict XV appointed him as the Italian president of the Society for the Propagation of the Faith. Roncalli recalled Benedict XV as the most sympathetic of the popes he had met.

== Episcopate ==
In February 1925, the Cardinal Secretary of State Pietro Gasparri summoned him to the Vatican and informed him of Pope Pius XI's decision to appoint him the Apostolic Visitor to Bulgaria (1925–1935). On 3 March, Pius XI also appointed him titular archbishop of Areopolis, Jordan. Roncalli was initially reluctant about a mission to Bulgaria, but he soon relented. His nomination as apostolic visitor was made official on 19 March. Roncalli was consecrated a bishop by Giovanni Tacci Porcelli in the church of San Carlo al Corso in Rome, on 25 March 1925.

On 30 November 1934, he was appointed Apostolic Delegate to Turkey and Greece and titular archbishop of Mesembria, Bulgaria. He became known in Turkey's predominantly Muslim society as "the Turcophile Pope". Roncalli took up this post in 1935 and used his office to help the Jewish underground in saving thousands of refugees in Europe, leading some to consider him to be a Righteous Gentile (see Pope John XXIII and Judaism). In October 1935, he led Bulgarian pilgrims to Rome and introduced them to Pope Pius XI on 14 October.

In February 1939, he received news from his sisters that his mother was dying. On 10 February 1939, Pope Pius XI died. Roncalli was unable to see his mother at the end as the death of a pontiff meant he had to stay at his post until the election of a new pontiff: she died on 20 February 1939, during the nine days of mourning for Pius XI. He was sent a letter by Cardinal Eugenio Pacelli, and Roncalli later recalled that it was probably the last letter Pacelli sent until his election as Pope Pius XII on 2 March 1939. Roncalli expressed happiness that Pacelli was elected and listened to his coronation on the radio.

Roncalli remained in Bulgaria when World War II began, optimistically writing in his journal in April 1939, "I don't believe we will have a war." When the war began, he was in Rome, meeting with Pope Pius XII on 5 September 1939. In 1940, Roncalli was asked by the Vatican to devote more of his time to Greece; therefore, he made several visits in January and May of that year. He maintained close relations with the Jews and also intervened to convince Bulgaria's King Boris III to cancel deportations of Greek Jews during the Nazi occupation of Greece.

=== Efforts during the Holocaust ===
As nuncio, Roncalli made efforts during the Holocaust in World War II to save refugees, mostly Jews, from the Nazis. Among his efforts were:

- Delivery of "immigration certificates" to Palestine through the Nunciature diplomatic courier.
- Rescue of Jews by means of certificates of "baptism of convenience" sent by Bishop Roncalli to priests in Europe.
- Children managed to leave Slovakia due to his interventions.
- Jewish refugees whose names were included on a list submitted by Rabbi Markus of Istanbul to Nuncio Roncalli.
- Jews held at Jasenovac concentration camp, near Stara Gradiška, were liberated as a result of his intervention.
- Bulgarian Jews who left Bulgaria, a result of his request to King Boris III of Bulgaria.
- Romanian Jews from Transnistria left Romania as a result of his intervention.
- Italian Jews helped by the Vatican as a result of his interventions.
- Orphaned children of Transnistria on board a refugee ship that weighed anchor from Constanța to Istanbul, and later arriving in Palestine as a result of his interventions.
- Jews held at the Sereď concentration camp who were spared from being deported to German death camps as a result of his intervention.
- Hungarian Jews who saved themselves through their conversions to Christianity through the baptismal certificates sent by Nuncio Roncalli to the Hungarian Nuncio, Angelo Rota.

In 1965, the Catholic Herald newspaper quoted Pope John XXIII as saying:

We are conscious today that many, many centuries of blindness have cloaked our eyes so that we can no longer see the beauty of Thy chosen people nor recognise in their faces the features of our privileged brethren. We realize that the mark of Cain stands upon our foreheads. Across the centuries our brother Abel has lain in blood which we drew, or shed tears we caused by forgetting Thy love. Forgive us for the curse we falsely attached to their name as Jews. Forgive us for crucifying Thee a second time in their flesh. For we know not what we did.

On 7 September 2000, the International Raoul Wallenberg Foundation launched the International Campaign for the Acknowledgement of the humanitarian actions undertaken by Vatican Nuncio Angelo Giuseppe Roncalli for people, most of whom were Jewish, persecuted by the Nazi regime. The launching took place at the Permanent Observation Mission of the Vatican to the United Nations, in the presence of Vatican State Secretary Cardinal Angelo Sodano.

The International Raoul Wallenberg Foundation has carried out exhaustive historical research related to different events connected with interventions of Nuncio Roncalli in favour of Jewish refugees during the Holocaust. As of September 2000 three reports have been published compiling different studies and materials of historical research about the humanitarian actions carried out by Roncalli when he was nuncio.

In 2011, the International Raoul Wallenberg Foundation submitted a massive file (the Roncalli Dossier) to Yad Vashem, with a strong petition and recommendation to bestow upon him the title of Righteous among the Nations.

=== Relations with Israel ===
After 1944, he played an active role in gaining Catholic Church support for the establishment of the State of Israel. His support for Zionism, and the establishment of Israel was the result of his cultural and religious openness toward other faiths and cultures, and especially concern with the fate of Jews after the war. He was one of the Vatican's most sympathetic diplomats toward Jewish immigration to Palestine, which he saw as a humanitarian issue, not a matter of biblical theology.

=== Nuncio ===
On 22 December 1944, during World War II, Pope Pius XII named Roncalli to be the new Apostolic Nuncio to recently liberated France. In this capacity he had to negotiate the retirement of bishops who had collaborated with the German occupying power.

Roncalli was chosen among several other candidates, one of whom was Archbishop Giuseppe Fietta. Roncalli met with Domenico Tardini to discuss his new appointment, and their conversation suggested that Tardini did not approve of it. One curial prelate referred to Roncalli as an "old fogey" while speaking with a journalist.

Roncalli left Ankara on 27 December 1944 on a series of short-haul flights that took him to several places, such as Beirut, Cairo and Naples. He ventured to Rome on 28 December and met with both Tardini and his friend Giovanni Battista Montini. He left for France the next day to commence his newest role. In November 1948, he went for his yearly retreat to the En-Calcat Abbey in Southern France.

== Cardinal ==
Commander of the Legion of Honour received in 1953

Roncalli received a message from Montini on 14 November 1952 asking him if he would want to become the new Patriarch of Venice in light of the nearing death of Carlo Agostini. Furthermore, Montini told him via letter on 29 November 1952 that Pius XII had decided to raise him to the cardinalate. Roncalli knew that he would be appointed to lead the patriarchy of Venice due to the death of Agostini, who was to have been raised to the rank of cardinal.

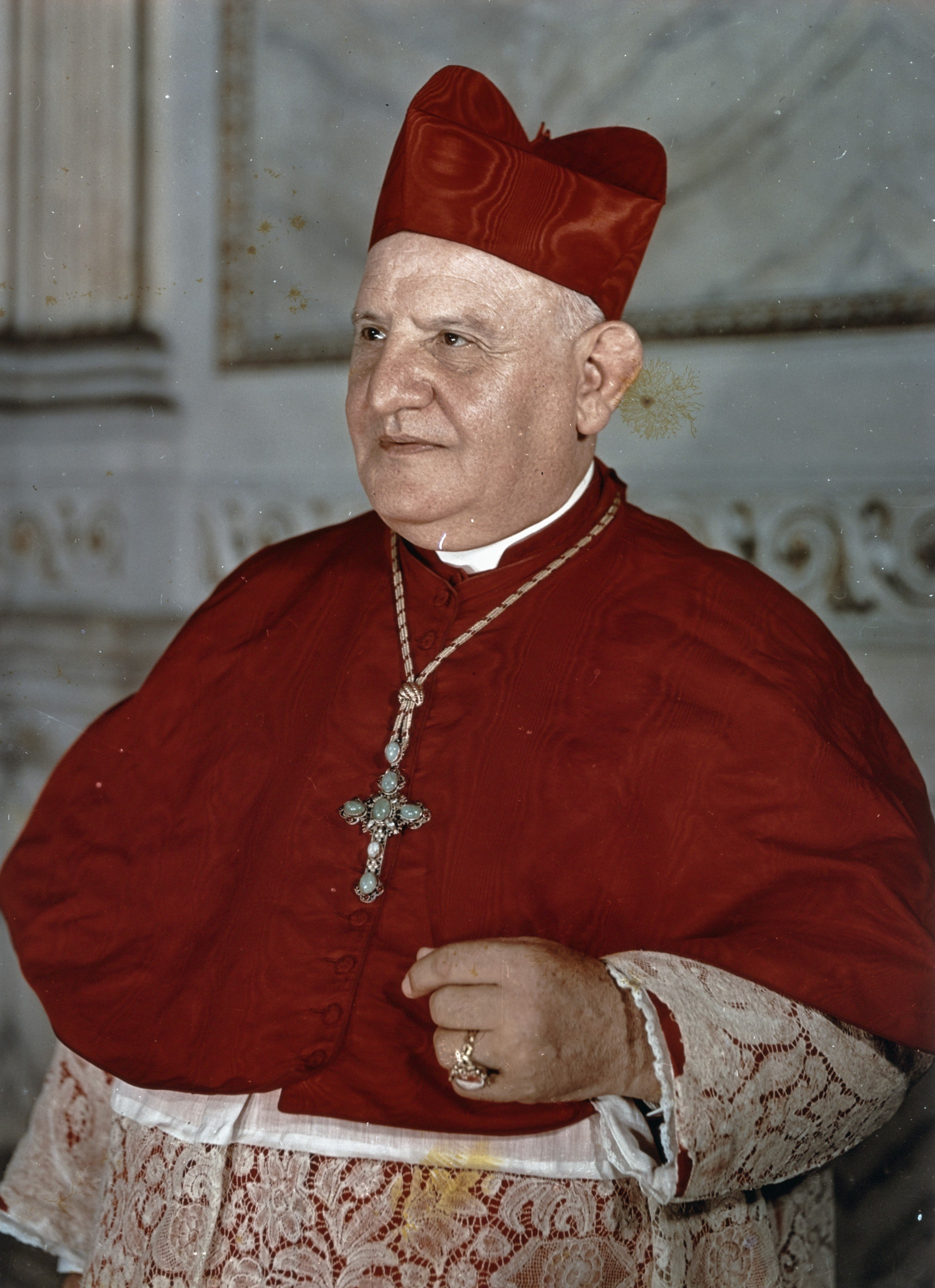
Roncalli as Patriarch of Venice

On 12 January 1953, he was appointed Patriarch of Venice and raised to the rank of Cardinal-Priest of Santa Prisca by Pope Pius XII. Before departing Paris he invited to dinner the eight men who had served as prime minister during Roncalli's term as nuncio. Roncalli left France for Venice on 23 February 1953, stopping briefly in Milan and then to Rome. On 15 March 1953, he took possession of his new diocese in Venice. As a sign of his esteem, the President of France, Vincent Auriol, claimed the ancient privilege possessed by French monarchs and bestowed the red biretta on Roncalli at a ceremony in the Élysée Palace. It was around this time that he, with the aid of Bruno Heim, formed his coat of arms with a lion of Saint Mark on a white ground. Auriol also awarded Roncalli three months later with the award of Commander of the Legion of Honour.

Roncalli decided to live on the second floor of the residence reserved for the patriarch, choosing not to live in the first-floor room once resided in by Giuseppe Melchiorre Sarto, who later became Pope Pius X. On 29 May 1954, the late Pius X was canonized, and Roncalli ensured that the late pontiff's patriarchal room was remodeled into a 1903 (the year of the new saint's papal election) look in his honor. With Pius X's few surviving relatives, Roncalli celebrated a Mass in his honor.

His sister Ancilla was diagnosed with stomach cancer in the early 1950s. In Roncalli's last letter to her, dated 8 November 1953, he promised to visit her within the next week. He could not keep that promise, as Ancilla died on 11 November while he was consecrating a new church in Venice. He attended her funeral in his hometown. In his will around this time, he mentioned that he wished to be buried in the crypt of St Mark's Basilica in Venice with some of his predecessors rather than with the family in Sotto il Monte.

In 1958, Roncalli held his first diocesan synod.

== Papacy ==
=== Papal election ===
Following the death of Pope Pius XII on 9 October 1958, Roncalli watched the live funeral on his last full day in Venice on 11 October. His journal was specifically concerned with the funeral and the abused state of the late pontiff's corpse. Roncalli left Venice for the conclave in Rome well aware that he was papabile, (Note: William Doino is one of the commentators who claim that Roncalli was papabile and argue that "[b]y the time of Pius XII’s death, in 1958, Cardinal Roncalli 'contrary to the idea he came out of nowhere to become pope' was actually one of those favored to be elected. He was well known, well-liked, and trusted.") and after eleven ballots, was elected to succeed the late Pius XII, so it came as no surprise to him, though he had arrived at the Vatican with a return train ticket to Venice.

Many had considered Giovanni Battista Montini, the Archbishop of Milan, a possible candidate, but, although he was the archbishop of one of the most ancient and prominent sees in Italy, he had not yet been made a cardinal. Though his absence from the 1958 conclave did not make him ineligible – under Canon Law any Catholic male who is capable of receiving priestly ordination and episcopal consecration may be elected – the College of Cardinals usually chose the new pontiff from among the Cardinals who attend the papal conclave. At the time, as opposed to modern practice, the participating Cardinals did not have to be below age 80 to vote, there were few Eastern-rite Cardinals, (Note: At the 1958 conclave, the two Eastern Catholic cardinal-electors were Gregorio Pietro Agagianian, Patriarch of Cilicia of the Armenian Catholic Church and Ignatius Gabriel I Tappouni, Patriarch of Antioch of the Syriac Catholic Church) and some Cardinals were just priests at the time of their elevation. (Note: At the 1958 conclave, Nicola Canali the Cardinal protodeacon was only an ordained priest and Alfredo Ottaviani, the Cardinal-Deacon of Santa Maria in Domnica had not yet been consecrated as a bishop.)

Roncalli was summoned to the final ballot of the conclave at 4:00 pm. He was elected pope at 4:30 pm with a total of 38 votes. After the long pontificate of Pope Pius XII, the cardinals chose a man who – it was presumed because of his advanced age – would be a short-term or "stop-gap" pope. Upon his election, Cardinal Eugène Tisserant asked him the ritual questions of whether he would accept and, if so, what name he would take for himself. Roncalli gave the first of his many surprises when he chose "John" as his papal name. Roncalli's exact words were, "I will be called John." This was the first time in over 500 years that this name had been chosen; previous popes had avoided its use since the time of the Antipope John XXIII during the Western Schism several centuries before.

On the choice of his papal name, Pope John XXIII said to the cardinals:

I will be called John. A name sweet to me because it is the name of my father, dear to me because it is the name of the humble parish church where I received baptism, the solemn name of numberless cathedrals scattered throughout the world, including our own basilica [St. John Lateran]. Twenty-two Johns of indisputable legitimacy have [been Pope], and almost all had a brief pontificate. I have preferred to hide the smallness of our name behind this magnificent succession of Roman Pontiffs.

Upon his choosing the name, there was some confusion as to whether he would be known as John XXIII or John XXIV; in response, he declared that he was John XXIII, thus affirming the antipapal status of antipope John XXIII.

Before this antipope, the most recent popes called John had been John XXII (1316–1334) and John XXI (1276–1277). No Pope John XX existed, owing to confusion caused by medieval historians misreading the Liber Pontificalis to refer to another Pope John between John XIV and John XV.

After his election, he confided in Cardinal Maurice Feltin that he had chosen the name "in memory of France and in the memory of John XXII who continued the history of the papacy in France."

After he answered the two ritual questions, the traditional Habemus Papam announcement was delivered by Cardinal Nicola Canali to the people at 6:08 pm, an exact hour after the white smoke appeared. A short while later, he appeared on the balcony and gave his first Urbi et Orbi blessing to the crowds of the faithful below in Saint Peter's Square. That same night, he appointed Domenico Tardini as his Cardinal Secretary of State. Of the three cassocks prepared for whoever the new pope was, even the largest was not enough to fit his obese frame, which had to be let out in certain places and only to be held together with great effort by safety pins. When he first saw himself in the mirror in his new vestments, he said with an appraising and critical look, "This man will be a disaster on television!" while later saying he felt his first appearance before the globe was as if he were a "newborn babe in swaddling clothes."

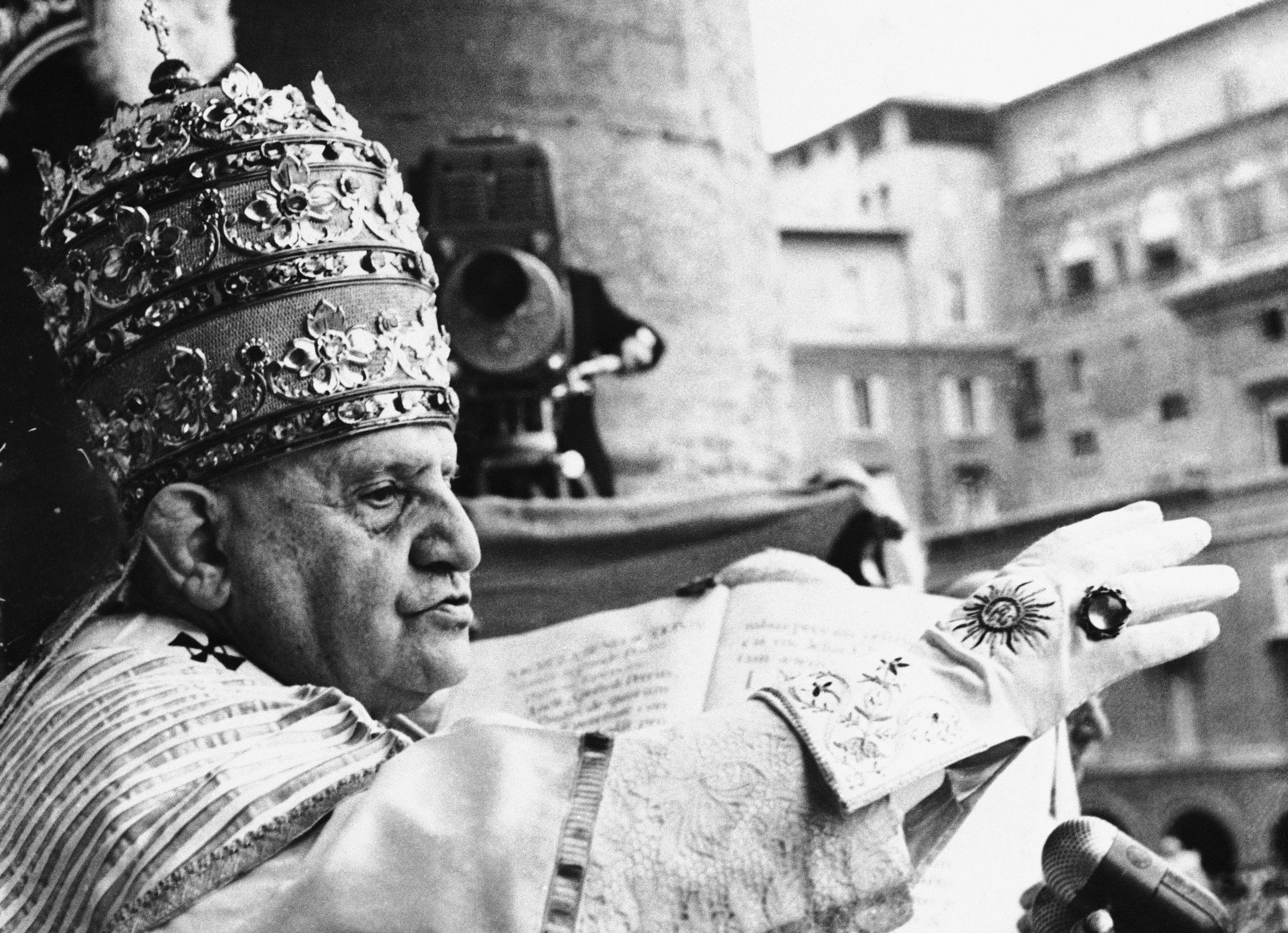
Pope John XXIII's coronation on 4 November 1958. He was crowned wearing the 1877 Palatine Tiara.

His coronation took place on 4 November 1958, on the feast of Saint Charles Borromeo, in the central loggia of the Vatican. He was crowned with the 1877 Palatine Tiara. His coronation lasted the traditional five hours.

In John XXIII's first consistory on 15 December of that same year, Montini was created a cardinal. He succeeded John XXIII in 1963, taking the name Paul VI. That consistory was notable for being the first to expand the Sacred College membership beyond the traditional 70.

Following his election, John XXIII told the tale of how, in his first weeks, he was walking when he heard a woman exclaim in a loud voice: "My God, he's so fat!" The new pope casually remarked: "Madame, the holy conclave isn't exactly a beauty contest!"

=== Visits around Rome ===
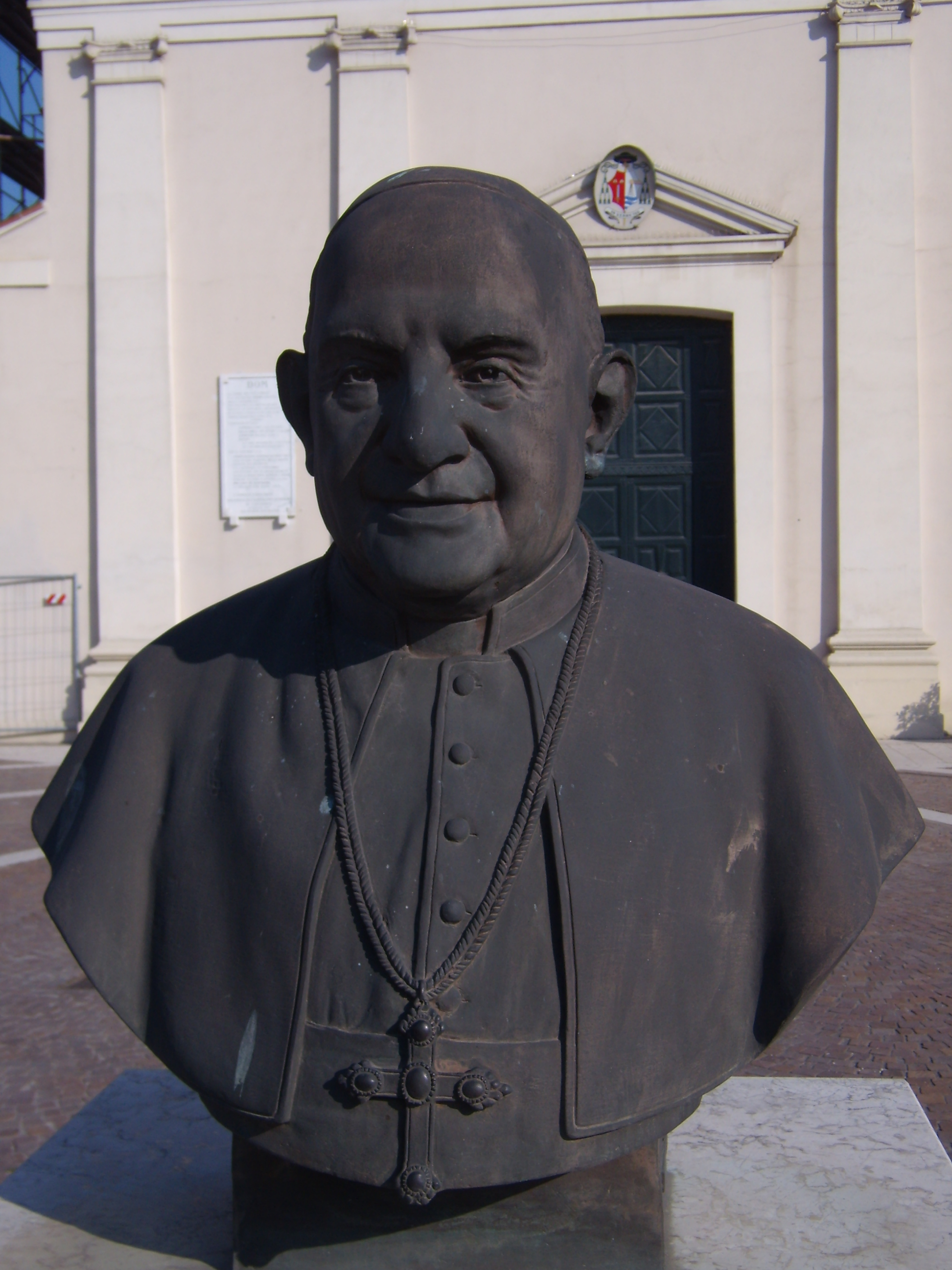
Monument to Pope John XXIII in Porto Viro (Rovigo)

On 25 December 1958, he became the first pope since 1870 to make pastoral visits in his Diocese of Rome, when he visited children infected with polio at the Bambino Gesù Hospital and then visited Santo Spirito Hospital. The following day, he visited Rome's Regina Coeli prison, where he told the inmates: "You could not come to me, so I came to you." These gestures created a sensation, and he wrote in his diary: "great astonishment in the Roman, Italian and international press. I was hemmed in on all sides: authorities, photographers, prisoners, warders".

During these visits, John XXIII put aside the normal papal use of the formal "we" when referring to himself, such as when he visited a reformatory school for juvenile delinquents in Rome, telling them, "I have wanted to come here for some time". The media noticed and reported, "He talked to the youths in their own language."

=== "Ostpolitik" and Eastern Europe ===
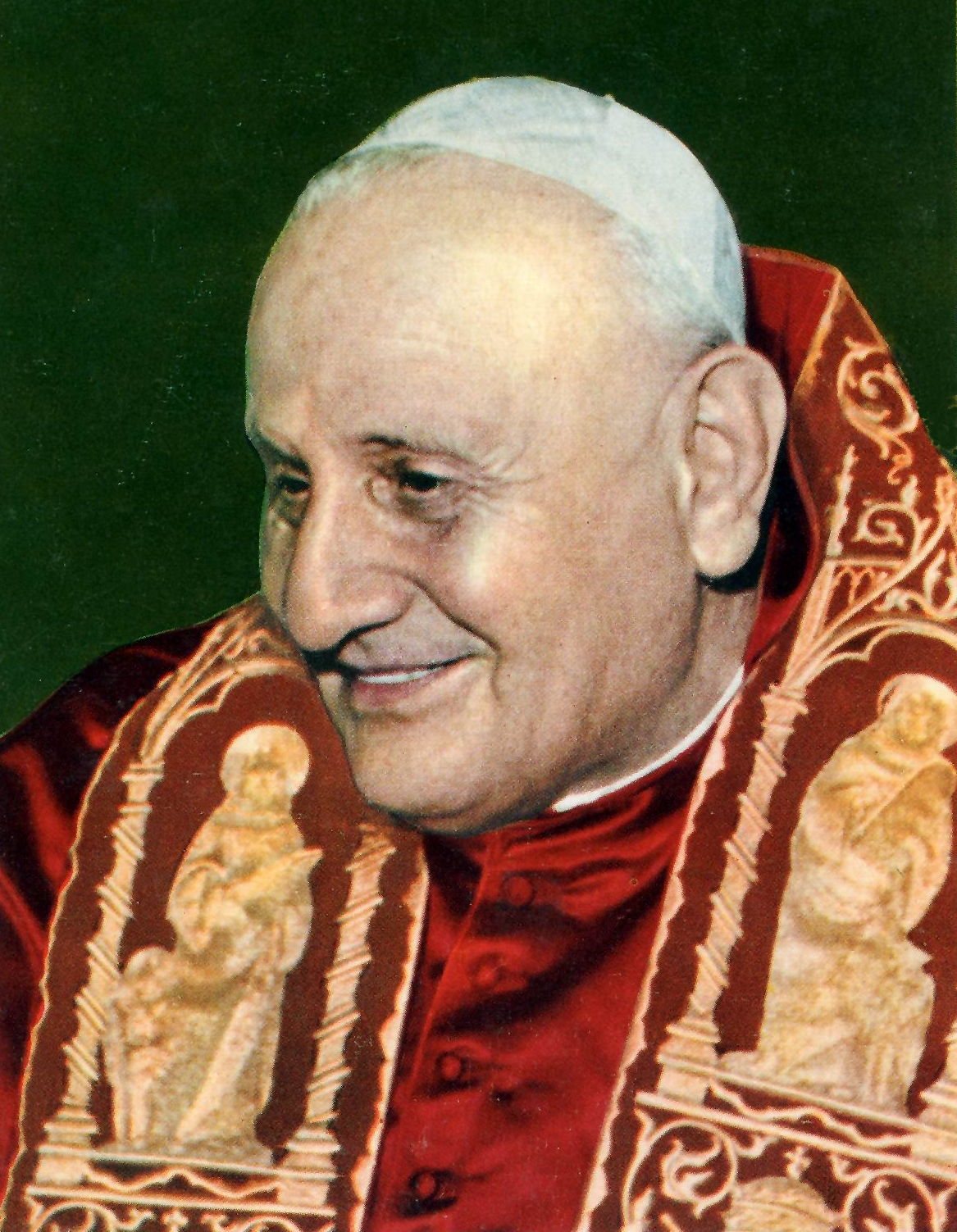
Pope John XXIII in 1959

In international affairs, his "Ostpolitik" ["Eastern policy"] engaged in dialogue with the Communist countries of Eastern Europe. He worked to reconcile the Vatican with the Russian Orthodox Church to settle tensions between the local churches. The Second Vatican Council did not condemn Communism and did not even mention it, in what some have called a secret agreement between the Holy See and the Soviet Union. In Pacem in terris, John XXIII also sought to prevent nuclear war and tried to improve relations between the Soviet Union and the United States. He began a policy of dialogue with Soviet leaders to seek conditions in which Eastern Catholics could find relief from persecution.

=== Relations with Jews ===
Pope John XXIII made several gestures to demonstrate his sympathetic feelings for the Jewish community. He sent a message to the Chief Rabbi of Israel announcing his election, even though the Holy See did not recognize the State of Israel. On 17 October 1960, he met with a delegation of 130 American Jews associated with the United Jewish Appeal. He greeted them with words from the Bible, "I am Joseph your brother," alluding to his birth name and to establish that he and they were starting a new relationship despite what may have passed between Catholics and Jews before, as Joseph reconciled with his brothers in Book of Genesis. On 17 March 1962, he stopped his car when he saw people exiting the synagogue in Rome and blessed them in the morning. A rabbi described the scene: "After a moment of understandable bewilderment, the Jews surrounded him and applauded him enthusiastically. It was in fact the first time in history that a pope had blessed Jews and it was perhaps the first real gesture of reconciliation."

One of the notable acts of Pope John XXIII, in 1960, was to eliminate the description of Jews as perfidius (Latin for "faithless") in the prayer for the conversion of the Jews in the Good Friday liturgy. He interrupted the first Good Friday liturgy in his pontificate to address this issue when he first heard a celebrant refer to the Jews with that word. He also made a confession for the Church for antisemitism through the centuries. Also, in 1960, John XXIII modified the language used in the baptism of adults, removing the warning against returning to one's earlier religious faith, with texts available for a pagan, Muslim, Jew, and heretical Christian. In the case of a Jewish convert the text was: "You should abhor Hebrew perfidy and reject Hebrew superstition." The modification was made because Pope John wanted "to emphasize everything that unites and to remove anything that unduly divides believers in God".

While Vatican II was being held, John XXIII tasked Cardinal Augustin Bea with creating several important documents that pertained to reconciliation with Jewish people. The declaration Nostra aetate is generally thought to have been influenced by Pope John's teachings.

These words and actions endeared him to the Jewish people. The Chief Rabbi of Israel, Yitzhak Nissim, later mourned his death as "A loss that saddens all those who seek peace and human love."

=== Calling the Council ===
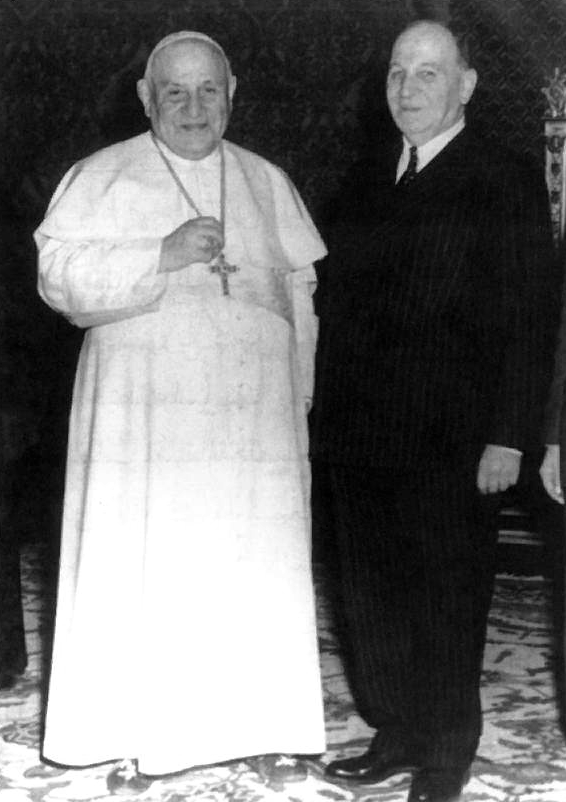
John XXIII with Prime Minister of Lebanon Sami Solh in 1959

Far from being a mere "stopgap" pope, to great excitement, John XXIII called for an ecumenical council fewer than 90 years after the First Vatican Council (Vatican I's predecessor, the Council of Trent, had been held in the 16th century). This decision was announced on 25 January 1959 at the Basilica of Saint Paul Outside the Walls. Cardinal Giovanni Battista Montini, who later became Pope Paul VI, remarked to Giulio Bevilacqua that "this holy old boy doesn't realize what a hornet's nest he's stirring up." From the Second Vatican Council came changes that reshaped the face of Catholicism: a comprehensively revised liturgy, a stronger emphasis on ecumenism, and a new approach to the world.

Prior to the first session of the council, John XXIII visited Assisi and Loreto on 4 October 1962 to pray for the new upcoming council as well as to mark the feast day of Saint Francis of Assisi. He was the first pope to travel outside Rome since Pope Pius IX. Along the way, there were several halts at Orte, Narni, Terni, Spoleto, Foligno, Fabriano, Iesi, Falconara Marittima and Ancona where the crowds greeted him.

=== Moral and doctrinal theology ===
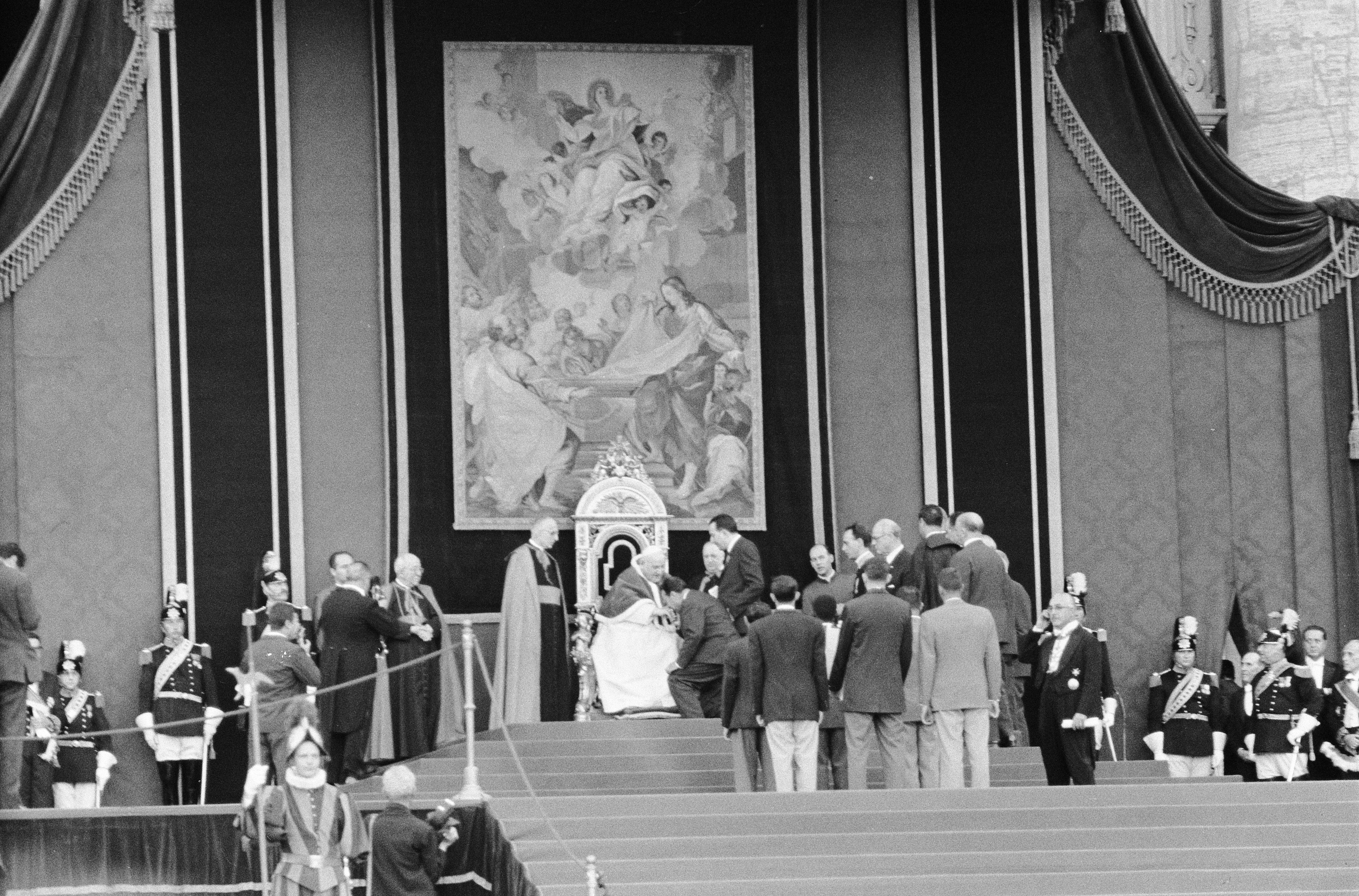
John XXIII greets sportsmen for the 1960 Summer Olympics.

In matters of doctrinal theology, John XXIII has been considered to be a traditionalist. Stravinskas notes his "determination ... to ensure doctrinal fidelity" with past church teaching while ensuring that there was a contemporary tone in how such teaching was communicated.

==== Contraception ====
In 1963, John XXIII established a commission of six non-theologians to investigate questions of birth control.

==== Human rights ====
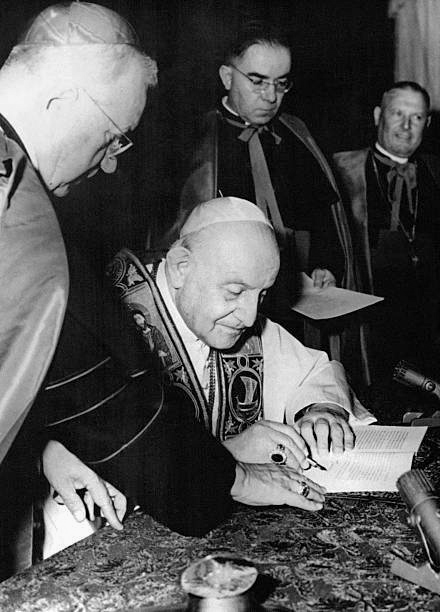
John XXIII signing the encyclical Pacem in terris in 1963

John XXIII was an advocate for human rights, including the rights of the unborn and the elderly. He wrote about human rights in his encyclical Pacem in terris. He wrote, "Man has the right to live. He has the right to bodily integrity and to the means necessary for the proper development of life, particularly food, clothing, shelter, medical care, rest, and, finally, the necessary social services. In consequence, he has the right to be looked after in the event of ill health; disability stemming from his work; widowhood; old age; enforced unemployment; or whenever through no fault of his own he is deprived of the means of livelihood."

==== Divorce ====
John XXIII said that human life is transmitted through the family, which is founded on the sacrament of marriage and is both one and indissoluble as a union in God, therefore, it is against the teachings of the Church for a married couple to divorce.

=== Pope John XXIII and papal ceremonial ===
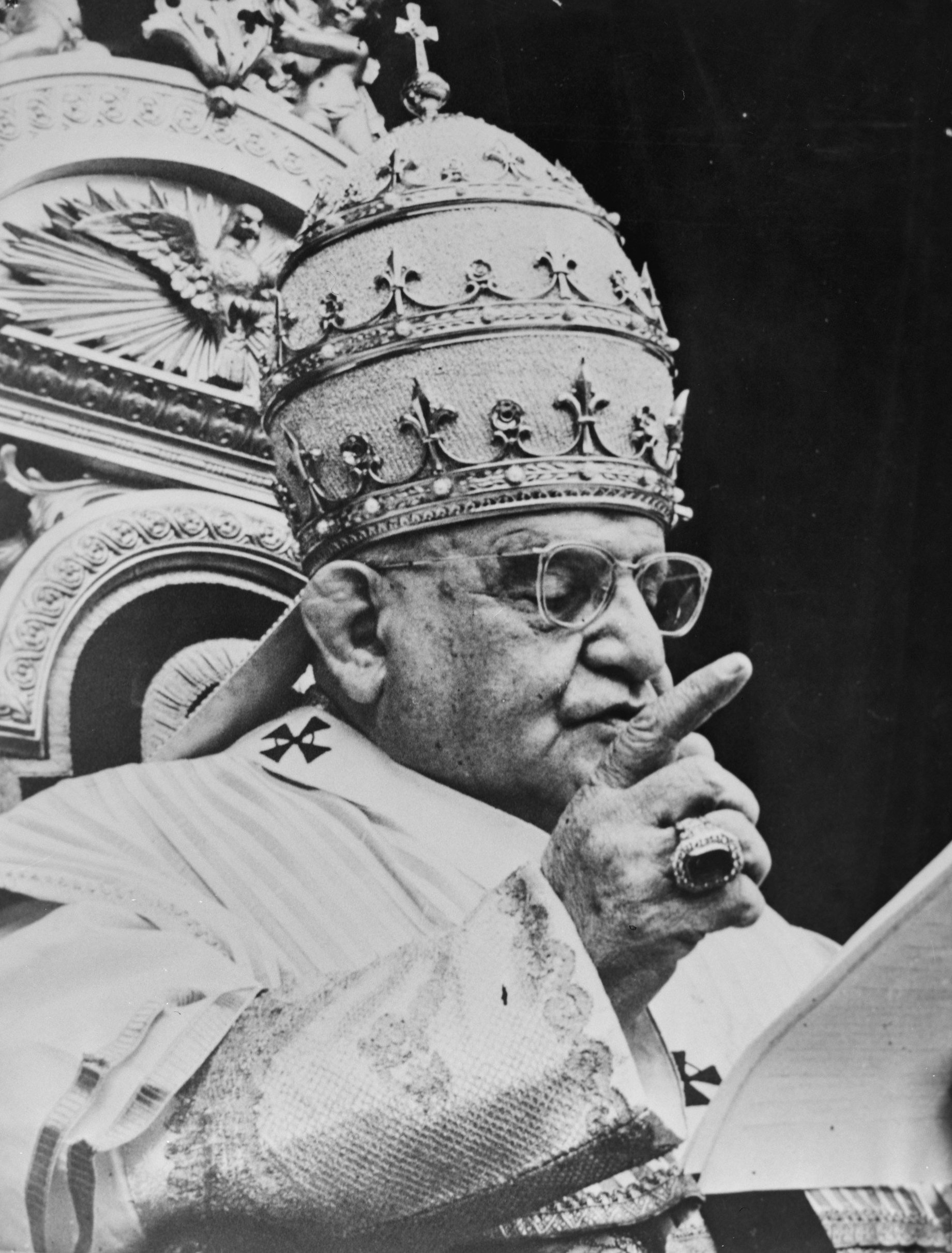
John XXIII with the papal tiara

Pope John XXIII was the last pope to use full papal ceremony, some of which was abolished after Vatican II, while the rest fell into disuse. His papal coronation ran for the traditional five hours (Pope Paul VI, by contrast, opted for a shorter ceremony, while later popes declined to be crowned). Pope John XXIII, like his predecessor Pius XII, chose to have the coronation itself take place on the balcony of St. Peter's Basilica, in view of the crowds assembled in Saint Peter's Square below.

John XXIII wore a number of papal tiaras during his papacy. On the most formal of occasions, he would don the 1877 Palatine tiara he received at his coronation, but on other occasions, he used the 1922 tiara of Pope Pius XI, which was used so often that it was associated with him quite strongly. The people of Bergamo gave him an expensive silver tiara, but he requested that the number of jewels used be halved and that the money be given to the poor.

=== Liturgical reform ===
Maintaining continuity with his predecessors, John XXIII continued the gradual reform of the Roman liturgy and published changes that resulted in the 1962 Roman Missal, the last typical edition containing the Tridentine Mass codified in 1570 by Pope Pius V after the Council of Trent. It inserted into the canon of the Mass the name of Saint Joseph, the first change for centuries in the canon of the Mass. Many traditionalist Catholics, today, continue to use the 1962 Roman Missal, to celebrate Mass in that form.

=== Beatifications and canonization ceremonies ===
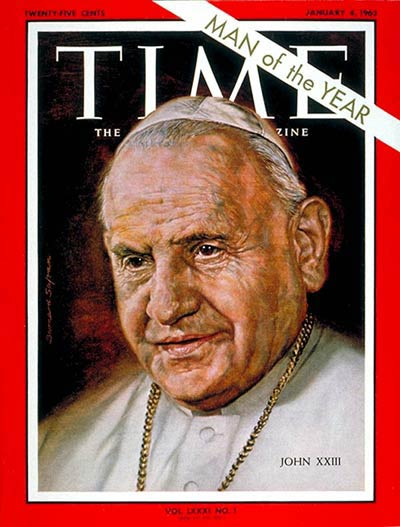
Pope John XXIII on Time magazine cover of 4 January 1963

John XXIII beatified four individuals in his reign: Elena Guerra (26 April 1959), Innocenzo da Berzo (12 November 1961), Elizabeth Ann Seton (17 March 1963) and Luigi Maria Palazzolo (19 March 1963).

He also canonized a small number of individuals: he canonized Charles of Sezze and Joaquina Vedruna de Mas on 12 April 1959, Gregorio Barbarigo on 26 May 1960, Juan de Ribera on 12 June 1960, Maria Bertilla Boscardin on 11 May 1961, Martin de Porres on 6 May 1962, and Antonio Maria Pucci, Francis Mary of Camporosso and Peter Julian Eymard on 9 December 1962. His final canonization was that of Vincent Pallotti on 20 January 1963.

==== Doctor of the Church ====
John XXIII proclaimed Saint Lawrence of Brindisi as a Doctor of the Church on 19 March 1959 and conferred upon him the title "Doctor apostolicus" ("Apostolic Doctor").

==== Relationship with Padre Pio ====
According to the Italian historian Sérgio Luzzatto, the relationship between Pope John XXIII and Pio of Pietrelcina (or "Padre Pio") was controversial and characterized by skepticism and criticism of Padre Pio made by John XXIII. He also accused Padre Pio of being a fraud and a lost soul who had an almost medieval faith and incorrect relationships with several women.

However, another source stated that John XXIII's attitude towards Padre Pio was generally very positive but that, due to the wrong and negative information he received, John XXIII became quite skeptical and critical. However, according to this same source, shortly before his death, the Pope confessed that he had been wrongly informed and recognized the holiness of Padre Pio, and even asked Padre Pio to pray for him.

=== Response to sexual abuse ===
On 17 August 2003, The Guardian, a British newspaper, published a confidential document of the Church, to which it had access, dated 16 March 1962, instructing bishops around the world to cover up cases of sexual abuse by clergy, or they would run the risk of being excommunicated from the Church. The document, bearing the seal of Pope John XXIII, is named Crimen sollicitationis, translated to "On the Manner of Proceeding in Cases of the Crime of Solicitation".

In the 69-page document, victims are asked to take an oath of secrecy when making a complaint to Church officials. It states that the instructions must 'be diligently stored in the secret archives of the [Vatican] Curia as strictly confidential. The theme focuses on sexual abuse initiated as part of the confessional relationship between a priest and a member of his congregation, but also covers aspects related to the "indescribable crime" with young people of both sexes and sex with animals. Bishops are instructed to investigate these cases 'in the most secret way [...] contained by a perpetual silence [...] and all must observe the strictest secret that is commonly considered a secret of the Holy Office, under penalty of excommunication.

The document was valid until 2001, when a new set of procedures was published by the Vatican to investigate and judge particularly serious canonical crimes, including certain sexual crimes committed by members of the clergy.

=== Consistories ===
The pope created 52 cardinals in five consistories, including his successor who would become Pope Paul VI. John XXIII decided to expand the size of the College of Cardinals beyond its limit of seventy that Pope Sixtus V established in 1586. The pope also reserved three additional cardinals "in pectore" in 1960 which meant he secretly named cardinals without revealing their identities. The pope died before he could reveal these names, therefore meaning that these appointments were never legitimized. John XXIII also sought to further internationalize the College of Cardinals like Pius XII attempted, while also naming the first-ever cardinals from countries such as Japan (Peter Doi) and Tanzania (Laurean Rugambwa). Unlike his predecessor, John XXIII held frequent consistories in a marked departure from Pius XII, returning to the frequency seen in the earlier 20th century.

John XXIII also issued a rule in 1962 mandating that all cardinals should be bishops; he himself ordained as bishops the twelve non-bishop cardinals in April 1962.

According to a June 2007 interview, Loris Francesco Capovilla revealed that Francesco Lardone was one of the cardinals that John XXIII had reserved in pectore in 1960. According to Capovilla, Lardone's precarious position in Turkey meant that he would have to abandon his position if he were named to the cardinalate. Lardone was of the opinion that he could assist bishops in the Iron Curtain from his posting which he would be unable to do if he was relocated to accept a position in Rome. In November 1960, in preparation for the next consistory, John XXIII offered the cardinalate to Diego Venini who declined the offer.

=== Vatican II: The first session ===
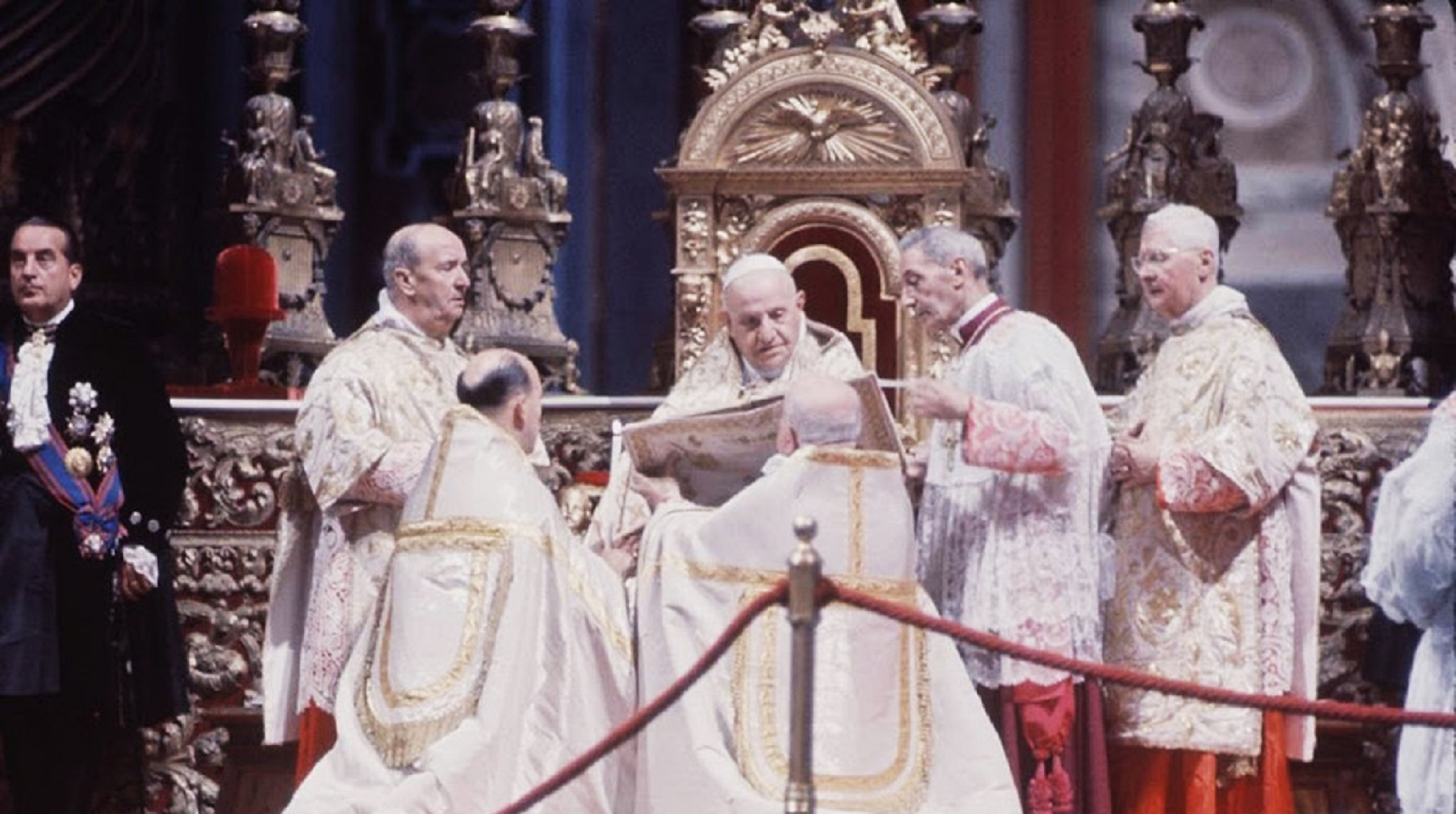
John XXIII presiding the opening Mass of the Second Vatican Council

On 11 October 1962, the first session of the Second Vatican Council was held in the Vatican. He gave the Gaudet Mater Ecclesia speech, which served as the opening address for the council. The day consisted of electing members for several council commissions that would work on the issues presented in the council. On the night following the conclusion of the first session, the people in Saint Peter's Square chanted and yelled with the objective of having John XXIII appear at the window to address them.

Pope John XXIII appeared at the window and delivered a speech to the people below, and told them to return home and hug their children, telling them that the hug came from the pope. This speech would later become known as the so-called 'Speech of the Moon, as John pointed to the moon, saying it was looking down on proceedings.'

The first session ended in a solemn ceremony on 8 December 1962, with the next session scheduled to occur in 1963 from 12 May to 29 June – this was announced on 12 November 1962. John XXIII's closing speech made subtle references to Pope Pius IX, and he had expressed the desire to see Pius IX beatified and eventually canonized. In his journal in 1959, during a spiritual retreat, John XXIII made this remark: "I always think of Pius IX of holy and glorious memory, and by imitating him in his sacrifices, I would like to be worthy to celebrate his canonization."

=== Final months and death ===
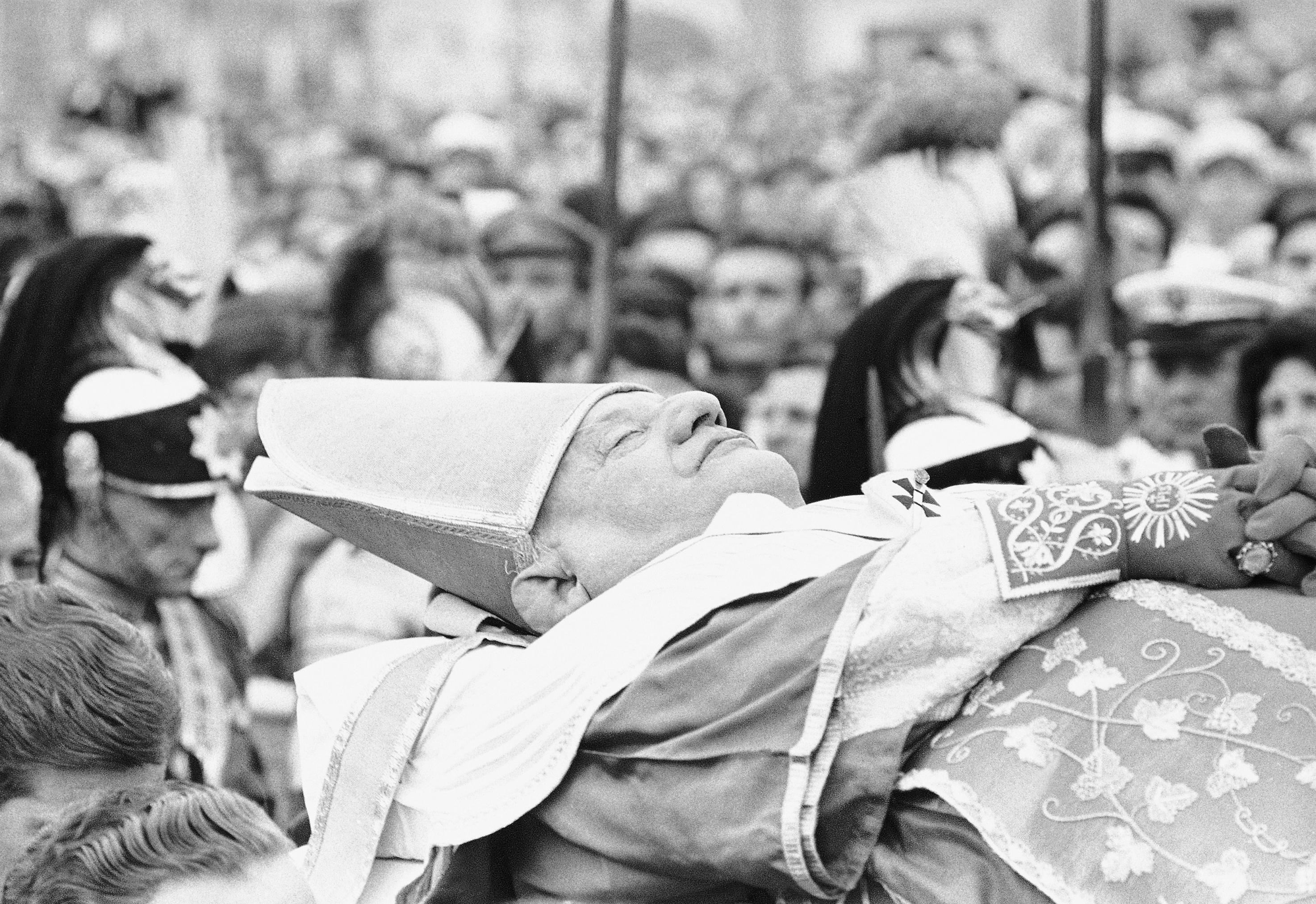
The body of John XXIII carried to St. Peter's Basilica for lying in state

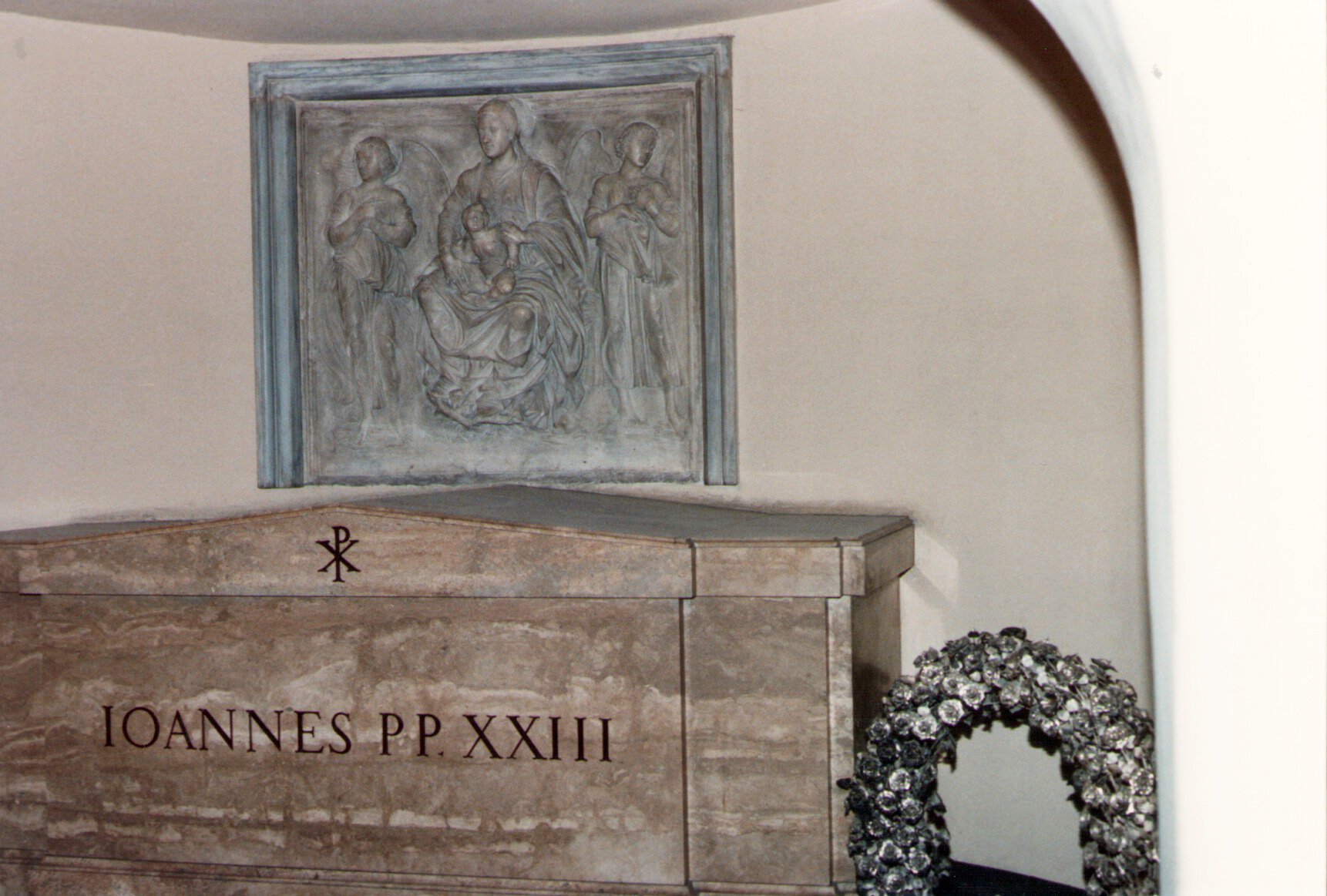
The original tomb of John XXIII (until 2000) in the Vatican necropolis

On 23 September 1962, Pope John XXIII was diagnosed with stomach cancer. The diagnosis, which was kept from the public, followed nearly eight months of occasional stomach hemorrhages and reduced the pontiff's appearances. Looking pale and drawn during these events, he gave a hint to his ultimate fate in April 1963, when he said to visitors, "That which happens to all men perhaps will happen soon to the Pope who speaks to you today."

Pope John XXIII offered to mediate between US President John F. Kennedy and Nikita Khrushchev during the Cuban Missile Crisis in October 1962. Both men applauded the pope for his deep commitment to peace. Khrushchev would later send a message via Norman Cousins and the letter expressed his best wishes for the pontiff's ailing health. John XXIII personally typed and sent a message back to him, thanking him for his letter. Cousins, meanwhile, traveled to New York City and ensured that John would become Time magazine's 'Man of the Year.' John XXIII became the first Pope to receive the title, followed by John Paul II in 1994 and Francis in 2013.

On 10 February 1963, John XXIII officially opened the process of beatification for the late Cardinal Andrea Carlo Ferrari, Archbishop of Milan from 1894 to 1921. This conferred upon him the title of Servant of God.

On 7 March 1963, the feast of the university's patron Saint Thomas Aquinas, Pope John XXIII visited the Pontifical University of Saint Thomas Aquinas Angelicum and with the motu proprio Dominicanus Ordo, raised the Angelicum to the rank of Pontifical University. Thereafter, it would be known as the Pontifical University of Saint Thomas Aquinas in the city.

On 10 May 1963, John XXIII received the Balzan Prize in private at the Vatican but deflected achievements of himself to the five popes of his lifetime, Pope Leo XIII to Pius XII. On 11 May, the Italian President Antonio Segni officially awarded Pope John XXIII with the Balzan Prize for his engagement for peace. While in the car en route to the official ceremony, he suffered great stomach pains but insisted on meeting with Segni to receive the award in the Quirinal Palace, refusing to do so within the Vatican. He stated that it would have been an insult to honor a pontiff on the remains of the crucified Saint Peter. It was the pope's last public appearance.

On 25 May 1963, the pope suffered another hemorrhage and required several blood transfusions, but cancer had perforated the stomach wall, and peritonitis soon set in. The doctors conferred in a decision regarding this matter, and John XXIII's aide Loris F. Capovilla broke the news to him, saying that the cancer had done its work and nothing could be done for him. Around this time, his remaining siblings arrived to be with him. By 31 May, it had become clear that the cancer had overcome the resistance of John XXIII – it had left him confined to his bed.

At 11 am Petrus Canisius van Lierde as Cardinal Secretary of State and Papal Sacristan was at the bedside of the dying pope, ready to anoint him. The pope began to speak for the last time: "I had the great grace to be born into a Christian family, modest and poor, but with the fear of the Lord. My time on Earth is drawing to a close. But Christ lives on and continues his work in the Church. Souls, souls, ut omnes unum sint." (Note: '...that all may be one.') Van Lierde then anointed his eyes, ears, mouth, hands, and feet. Overcome by emotion, van Lierde forgot the right order of anointing. John XXIII gently helped him before bidding those present a last farewell.

— Peter Hebblethwaite, John XXIII, Pope of the Council (1994), page 502

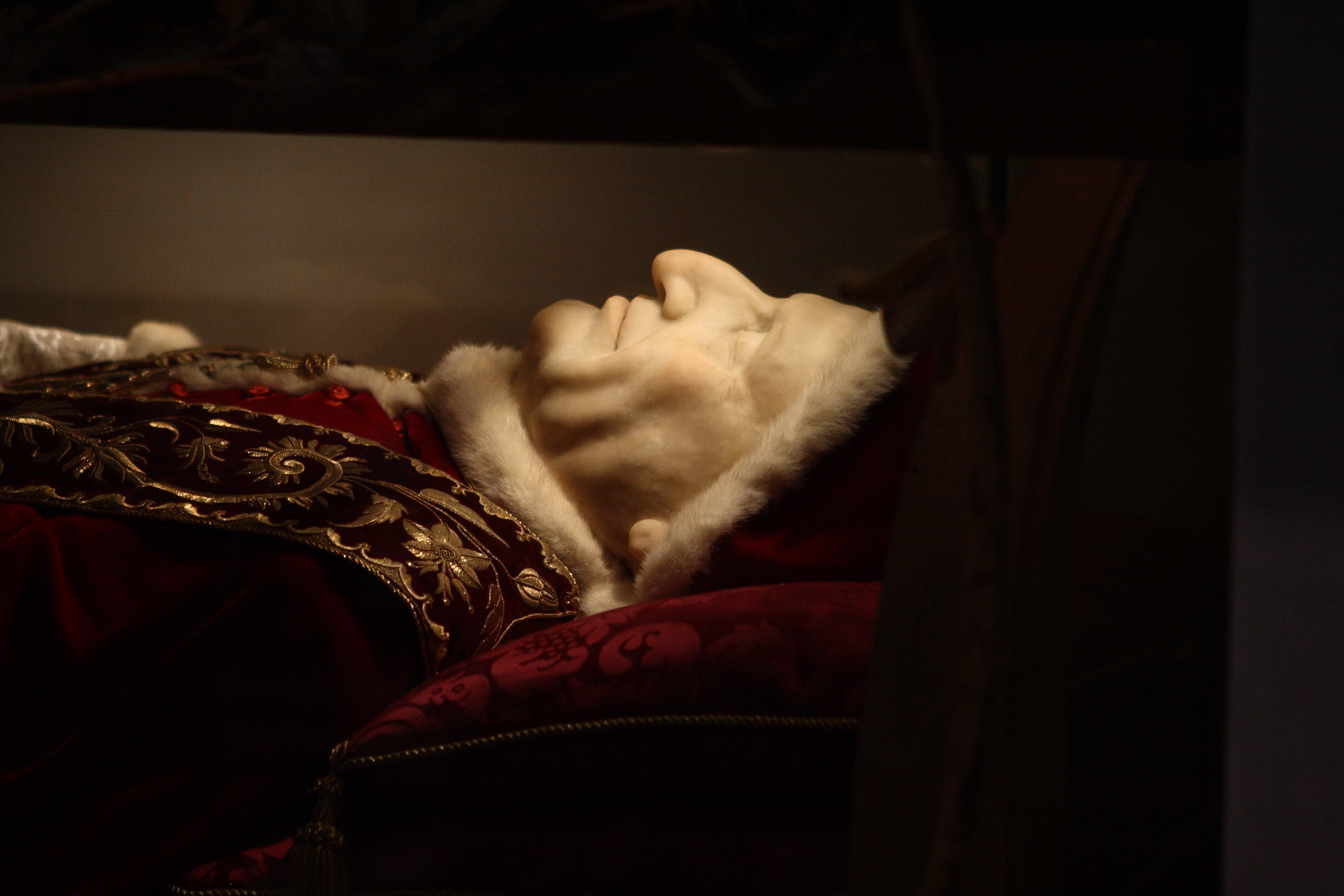
Close up face of John XXIII

John XXIII died of peritonitis caused by a perforated stomach at 19:49 local time on 3 June 1963 at the age of 81, ending a historic pontificate of four years and seven months. He died just as a Mass for him finished in Saint Peter's Square below, celebrated by Luigi Traglia. Then, the room was illuminated, thus informing the people of what had happened. The Italian government announced three days of mourning with flags half-masted and the closure of offices and schools. Spain announced ten days of mourning with flags half-masted; The Philippines announced nine days of mourning with flags half-masted; Brazil declared five days of mourning; Portugal, Paraguay and Guatemala announced three days of mourning; the Republic of the Congo declared one day of mourning. He was buried on 6 June in the Vatican Grottoes. Two wreaths, placed on the two sides of his tomb, were donated by the prisoners of the Regina Coeli prison and the Mantova jail in Verona. On 22 June 1963, one day after his friend and successor Pope Paul VI was elected, the latter prayed at his tomb. John XXIII's tomb is located near the tombs of both Pope Pius X and Pope John Paul II.

== Beatification and canonization ==
Pope Saint John XXIII
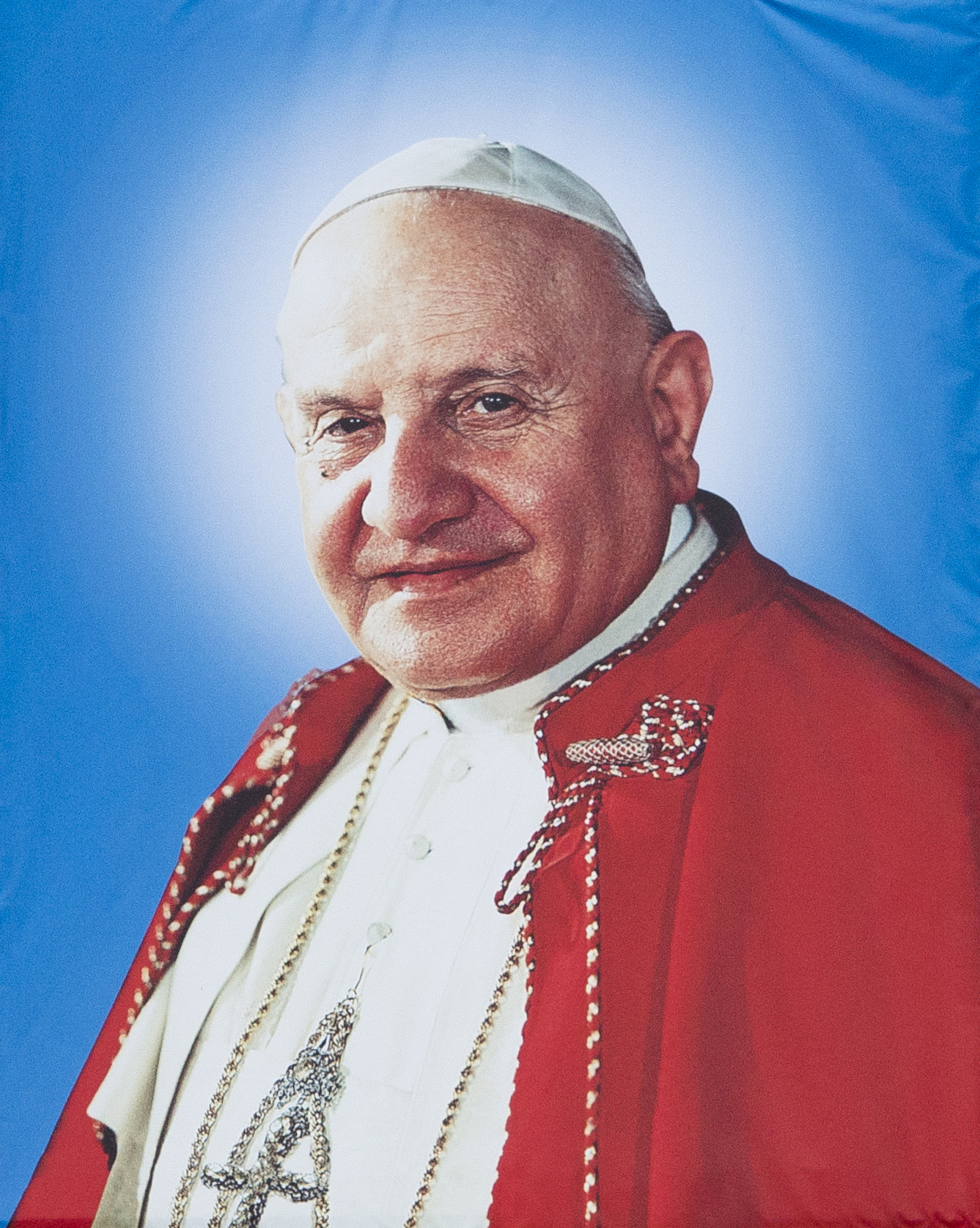

Pope and Confessor
- Venerated in: Catholic Church; Evangelical Lutheran Church in America; Anglicanism
- Beatified: 3 September 2000, St. Peter's Square, Vatican City by Pope John Paul II
- Canonized: 27 April 2014, St. Peter's Square, Vatican City by Pope Francis
- Feast: 11 October
- Attributes: Papal Vestments, Papal Tiara, Camauro
- Patronage: Patriarchy of Venice, Papal Delegates, Second Vatican Council, Christian Unity, Diocese of Bergamo, Sotto il Monte, Valsamoggia, Italian Army

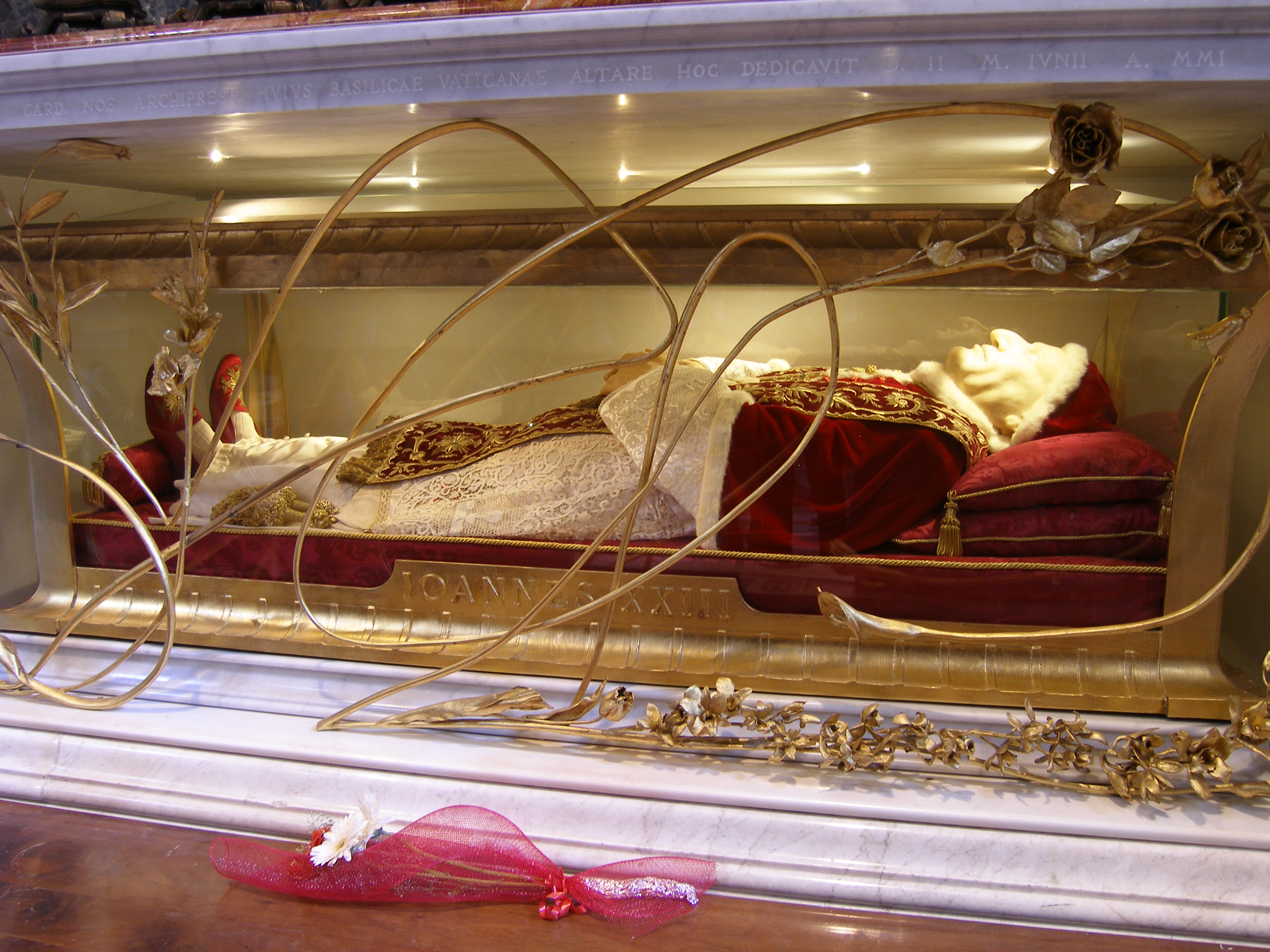
The body of St. John XXIII in the altar of Saint Jerome

Pope Saint John XXIII was known affectionately as the "Good Pope". His cause for canonization was opened under Pope Saint Paul VI during the final session of the Second Vatican Council on 18 November 1965, along with the cause of Pope Pius XII. On 3 September 2000, John XXIII was declared "Blessed" alongside Pope Pius IX by Pope Saint John Paul II, the penultimate step on the road to sainthood, after a miracle of curing an ill woman was discovered. He was the first pope since Pope Pius X to receive this honour. Following his beatification, his body was moved from its original burial place in the grottoes below the Vatican to the altar of St. Jerome and displayed for the veneration of the faithful.

At the time, the body was observed to be extremely well preserved – a condition which the Church ascribes to embalming and the lack of airflow in his sealed triple coffin rather than a miracle. When John XXIII's body was moved in 2001, it was once again treated to prevent deterioration. The original vault above the floor was removed and a new one built beneath the ground; it was here that the body of Pope John Paul II was entombed from 9 April 2005 to April 2011, before being moved for his beatification on 1 May 2011. The tomb was ultimately occupied by Benedict XVI following his death in 2022.

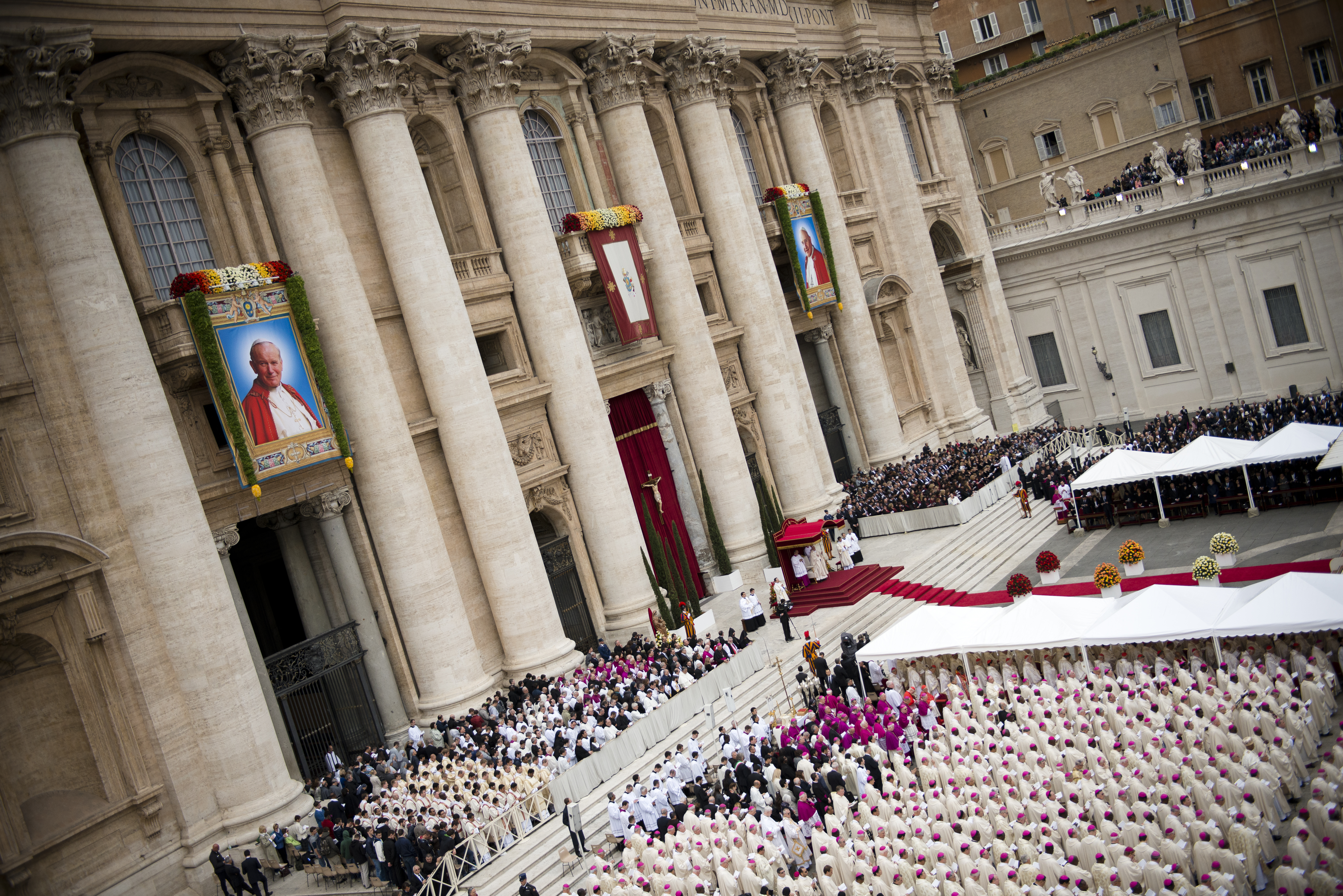
Canonization ceremony of John XXIII and John Paul II

The 50th anniversary of his death was commemorated on 3 June 2013 by Pope Francis, who visited his tomb and prayed there, then addressed the gathered crowd and spoke about the late pope. The people who gathered there at the tomb were from Bergamo, the province where the late pope came from. A month later, on 5 July 2013, Pope Francis approved Pope John XXIII for canonization, along with Pope John Paul II, without the traditional second miracle required. Instead, Francis based this decision on John XXIII's merits for the Second Vatican Council. On Sunday, 27 April 2014, John XXIII and Pope John Paul II were declared saints on Divine Mercy Sunday.

The date assigned for the liturgical celebration of John XXIII is not 3 June, the anniversary of his death, as would be usual (due to the obligatory memorial of saints Charles Lwanga and his companion martyrs), but 11 October, the anniversary of his opening of the Second Vatican Council. He is also commemorated in the Anglican Church of Canada, the Evangelical Lutheran Church in America, and some other organizations with a feast day of 3 June or 4 June.

== Tributes ==
On 3 December 1963, US President Lyndon B. Johnson posthumously awarded him the Presidential Medal of Freedom, the United States' highest civilian award, in recognition of the good relationship between Pope John XXIII and the United States of America. The citation for the medal reads:

His Holiness Pope John XXIII, dedicated servant of God. He brought to all citizens of the planet a heightened sense of the dignity of the individual, of the brotherhood of man, and of the common duty to build an environment of peace for all humankind.

Paul VI wrote in his first encyclical letter, Ecclesiam Suam, that John had "labored with masterly assurance to bring divine truths as far as may be within the reach of the experience and understanding of modern man."

In 1965, Harry Saltzman produced a biography of Pope John XXIII, called A Man Named John, based on the diary he kept between the ages of 14 and 18, documenting his lifelong concern for tolerance, for the underprivileged, and for world peace. His character is played by Rod Steiger.

Raymond Burr played Pope John XXIII in the 1973 ABC TV Movie Portrait: A Man Whose Name Was John, with Don Galloway as Thomas Ryan and David Opatoshu as Isaac Herzog. The film tells the story of how John XXIII saved the lives of hundreds of Jewish children by preventing their transportation to Nazi Germany from neutral Turkey during World War II. The film is told from the perspective of a Jewish journalist who was one of the children he had saved.

== Legacy ==
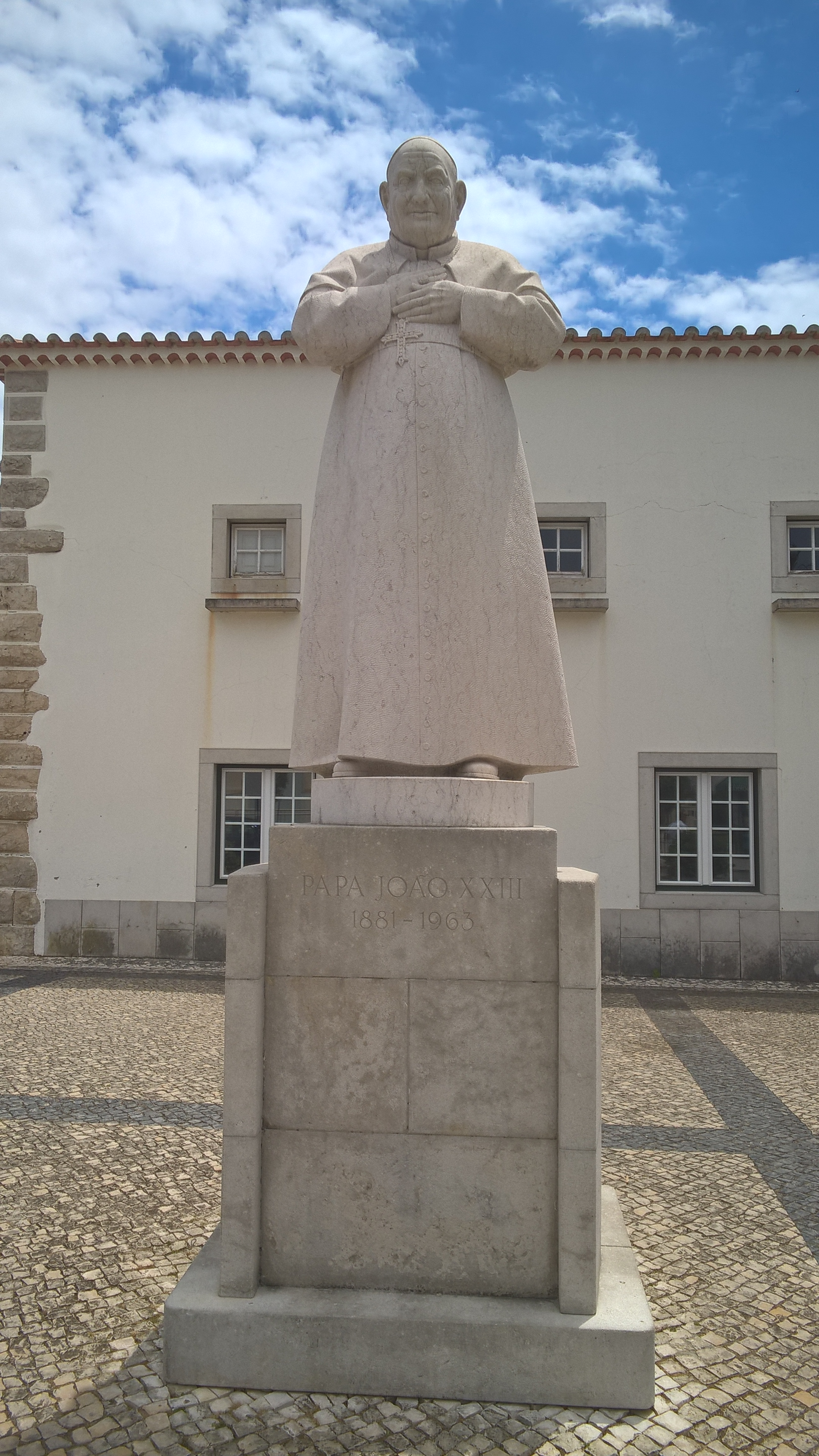
Statue of Saint John XXIII in Lourinhã, Portugal

From his teens, when he entered the seminary, he maintained a diary of spiritual reflections that was subsequently published as the Journal of a Soul. The collection of writings charts Roncalli's goals and his efforts as a young man to "grow in holiness" and continues after his election to the papacy; it remains widely read.

The opening titles of Pier Paolo Pasolini's film The Gospel According to St. Matthew (1964) dedicate the film to the memory of John XXIII.

Institutions named after Pope Saint John XXIII include: John XXIII College (Perth) in Western Australia; Escola Estadual de Ensino Médio Cardeal Roncalli, in Frederico Westphalen, Rio Grande do Sul, Brazil; Pope John Senior High School and Junior Seminary in Koforidua, Ghana; the Catholic Learning Community of John XXIII, a primary school in Sydney; Roncalli College, located in Timaru, New Zealand; Roncalli High Schools in Indianapolis, Indiana, Aberdeen, South Dakota, Manitowoc, Wisconsin, Sparta, New Jersey and Omaha, Nebraska; Saint John XXIII College Preparatory in Katy, Texas; John XXIII School in India; Jean-XXIII High School in Montréal, Québec; St. John XXIII Catholic School in Kingston, Ontario; St. John XXIII Catholic School in Middletown, Ohio; St. John XXIII College Seminary in Pal-ing, Malaybalay City, Bukidnon in the Philippines; and The Diocese of St John XXIII – Reformed Catholic Church.

Parishes named after John XXIII in the US are located in Evanston, Illinois; Fort Collins, Colorado; Fort Myers, Florida; West Seneca, New York; Perrysburg, Ohio; Canal Winchester, Ohio; Knoxville, Tennessee; and Tacoma, Washington. Since 2001, there is a John XXIII parish in Dubrava, Zagreb, in Croatia. There is a statue of Pope John XXIII in Istanbul, Turkey.

During an event held on 6 May 2019 in Sofia (Bulgaria), Pope Francis invoked John XXIII's encyclical Pacem in terris as a "code of conduct" for peace between Catholics and other religions.

== See also ==
- Aggiornamento
- Central Preparatory Commission
- List of Catholic saints
- List of encyclicals of Pope John XXIII
- List of meetings between the pope and the president of the United States
- List of popes

== Notes ==
Diplomatic posts
Position created	Apostolic Delegate to Bulgaria; 16 October 1931 – 12 January 1935	Succeeded by Giuseppe Mazzoli
Preceded by Carlo Margotti	Apostolic Delegate to Greece; 12 January 1935 – 23 December 1944	Nunciature established
Preceded by Carlo Margotti	Apostolic Delegate to Turkey; 12 January 1935 – 23 December 1944	Succeeded by Alcide Giuseppe Marina
Preceded by Valerio Valeri	Apostolic Nuncio to France; 23 December 1944 – 12 January 1953	Succeeded by Paolo Marella
Catholic Church titles
Preceded by Paolo Emio Bergamaschi	— TITULAR — Titular Archbishop of Areopolis; 3 March 1925 – 30 November 1934	Succeeded by Michael Joseph Keyes
Preceded by Carlo Margotti	— TITULAR — Titular Archbishop of Mesembria; 30 November 1934 – 12 January 1953	Succeeded by Silvio Oddi
Preceded by Carlo Margotti	Apostolic Administrator of Constantinople; 12 January 1935 – 23 December 1944	Succeeded by Alcide Marina
Preceded by Carlo Agostini	Patriarch of Venice; 15 January 1953 – 28 October 1958	Succeeded by Giovanni Urbani
Preceded by Adeodato Giovanni Piazza	Cardinal-Priest of Santa Prisca; 29 October 1953 – 28 October 1958	Succeeded by Giovanni Urbani
Preceded by Pius XII	Pope; 28 October 1958 – 3 June 1963	Succeeded by Paul VI
