= Apostolic Nunciature to Turkmenistan =

Diplomatic mission of the Holy See in Central Asia

The Apostolic Nunciature to Turkmenistan is an ecclesiastical office of the Catholic Church in Turkmenistan. It is a diplomatic post of the Holy See, whose representative is called the Apostolic Nuncio with the rank of an ambassador.

The title Apostolic Nuncio to Turkmenistan is held by the prelate appointed Apostolic Nuncio to Turkey; he resides in Turkey.

== List of papal representatives to Turkmenistan ==
Apostolic Nuncios

- Pier Luigi Celata (3 April 1997 - 3 March 1999)
- Luigi Conti (15 May 1999 - 8 August 2001)
- Edmond Farhat (11 December 2001 - 26 July 2005)
- Antonio Lucibello (27 August 2005 - 2015)
- Paul Fitzpatrick Russell (19 March 2016 - 22 October 2021)
- Marek Solczyński (8 September 2022 - present)
