= Antonio Lucibello =

Italian prelate of the Catholic Church (born 1942)

His Excellency, The Most Reverend Antonio Lucibello
- Apostolic Nuncio emeritus to Turkey and Turkmenistan; Titular Archbishop of Thurio
- Appointed: 27 August 2005
- Retired: 19 March 2016
- Predecessor: Edmond Farhat
- Successor: Paul Fitzpatrick Russell
- Other post: Titular Archbishop of Thurio
- Previous posts: Apostolic Nuncio to Paraguay (1999-2005); Apostolic Nuncio to Sierra Leone, Gambia, Guinea and Liberia (1995-1999)

Orders
- Ordination: 23 July 1967
- Consecration: 4 November 1995 by Angelo Sodano, Josip Uhac, and Andrea Cassone

Personal details
- Born: February 25, 1942 (age 84) Spezzano Albanese, Calabria, Italy
- Motto: SERVUS ET APOSTOLUS

Styles of Antonio Lucibello
- Reference style: His Excellency; The Most Reverend
- Spoken style: Your Excellency
- Religious style: Archbishop

Antonio Lucibello (born 25 February 1942) is an Italian prelate of the Catholic Church who worked in the diplomatic service of the Holy See from 1971 to 2016. He has held the rank of archbishop and apostolic nuncio since 1995.

== Biography ==
Antonio Lucibello was born on 25 February 1942 in Spezzano Albanese, Calabria, Italy. He was ordained a priest on 23 July 1967. He studied at the Pontifical Ecclesiastical Academy.

== Diplomatic career ==
He entered the diplomatic service of the Holy See in 1971. He filled positions in the Apostolic Nunciatures in Panama, Ethiopia, Haiti, Argentina, the Democratic Republic of the Congo, Zaire, Yugoslavia, Greece and Ireland. On 8 September 1995, Pope John Paul II appointed him titular archbishop of Thurio and Apostolic Nuncio to Gambia, Guinea and Liberia, as well as Apostolic Delegate to Sierra Leone. (Note: His title in Sierra Leone changed to Apostolic Nuncio on 13 December 1996.)

He received his episcopal consecration from Cardinal Secretary of State Angelo Sodano on 4 November 1995.

On 27 July 1999, John Paul named him Apostolic Nuncio to Paraguay.

Pope Benedict XVI appointed him Apostolic Nuncio to Turkey and Turkmenistan on 27 August 2005. During his service in these posts, a Catholic priest was murdered in Ankara in February 2006, Pope Benedict visited Turkey in December 2006, Bishop Luigi Padovese of the Apostolic Vicariate of Anatolia was murdered in 2010, and in 2015 Turkey recalled its ambassador to the Holy See after Pope Francis used the word "genocide" to describe the deaths of Armenians in the Ottoman Empire.

With the appointment of his successor Paul Fitzpatrick Russell on 19 March 2016, Lucibello ended his active service as nuncio.

== See also ==
- List of heads of the diplomatic missions of the Holy See
