= Paul Fitzpatrick Russell =

American Catholic archbishop (born 1959)

His Excellency, The Most Reverend Paul Fitzpatrick Russell
- Archbishop Auxiliary Bishop of Detroit; Titular Archbishop of Novi
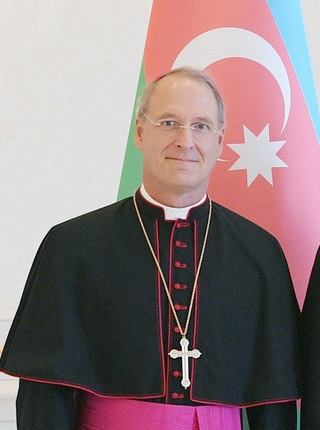
- Archdiocese: Detroit
- Appointed: May 23, 2022
- Installed: July 7, 2022
- Other post: Titular Archbishop of Novi
- Previous posts: Apostolic Nuncio to Türkiye, Turkmenistan and Azerbaijan (2016–2022); Chargé d’affaires to China (2008–2016)

Orders
- Ordination: June 20, 1987 by Cardinal Bernard Law
- Consecration: June 3, 2016 by Sean O'Malley, Allen Vigneron and Leo Cushley

Personal details
- Born: May 2, 1959 (age 67) Greenfield, Massachusetts, U.S.
- Education: Saint John's Seminary; Pontifical Gregorian University; Pontifical Ecclesiastical Academy
- Motto: Cor ad cor loquitur (Heart speaks to heart)

Styles of Paul Fitzpatrick Russell
- Reference style: His Excellency; The Most Reverend
- Spoken style: Your Excellency
- Religious style: Bishop

Paul Fitzpatrick Russell (born May 2, 1959) is an American prelate of the Catholic Church who was appointed auxiliary bishop of the Archdiocese of Detroit in Michigan in 2022. He previously served as the apostolic nuncio to Turkey, Turkmenistan, and Azerbaijan and the head of the diplomatic mission to Taiwan. In accordance with those roles, he has the personal title of archbishop.

== Biography ==
=== Early life ===
Paul Russell was born in Greenfield, Massachusetts on May 2, 1959. to Isabelle Fitzpatrick and Thaddeus Russell. The family lived in Shelburne Falls, Massachusetts, then moved to Malden, Massachusetts and next to Willmington, Massachusetts. In a 2016 interview, Russell said that he first thought of becoming a priest in the first grade.

When Russell was in third grade, his parents divorced; Russell moved with his mother and siblings to Alpena, Michigan. He then attended the parish school of St. Bernard of Clairvaux. Russell graduated from Alpena High School in 1977, and then spent a year in France as an exchange student.

After returning from France, Russell entered at Saint John's Seminary in Boston. Wanting to learn Spanish, he traveled to Peru and Bolivia with the St. James Society, spending a year in South America. Part of his time there was spent in language school, the other part was living with a poor family.

Russell returned to St. John Seminary around 1985 to resume his studies. On January 31, 1987, he was ordained a transitional deacon and was assigned to St. Joseph Parish in Wakefield, Massachusetts.

=== Priesthood ===
On June 20, 1987, Russell was ordained to the priesthood for the Archdiocese of Boston at the Cathedral of the Holy Cross in Boston by Archbishop Bernard Law.

After his 1987 ordination, the archdiocese assigned Russell as an associate pastor to Sacred Heart Parish in West Lynn, Massachusetts. In 1992, shortly after arriving at a new assignment at St. Eulalia Parish in Winchester, Massachusetts, Law asked Russell to become one of his priest-secretaries. In 1993, Law invited Russell to join the Vatican Diplomatic Service.

=== Vatican diplomatic service ===
In 1993, Russell went to Rome to enter the Pontifical Ecclesiastical Academy, the training facility for Vatican diplomats. He earned a Licentiate in Canon Law and a Doctor of Canon Law degree at the Pontifical Gregorian University in Rome.

On July 1, 1997, Russell entered the diplomatic service, serving first for a short while in Rome working with Bishop James Harvey. Later in 1997, Russell was assigned to the Apostolic Nunciature to Ethiopia, Eritrea and Djibouti, stationed in Ethiopia. He worked there for three years. In 2000, the Vatican sent Russell to the Apostolic Nunciature to Turkey and Turkmenistan. In 2002, he was transferred to the Apostolic Nunciature to Switzerland, when he also assumed pastoral duties of an English-language parish. In 2005, Russell went to the Apostolic Nunciature to Nigeria, remaining there three years.

On May 2, 2008, Pope Benedict XVI named Russell as chargé d'affaires of the Apostolic Nunciature to China (located in Taiwan, the Republic of China), making him the head of the diplomatic mission. (Note: The Nunciature to China is located in Taipei, and the Holy See maintains full diplomatic ties with Taiwan, but no nuncio has been named to head that mission since 1971 as the Holy See negotiates its relationship with the People's Republic of China. There is nevertheless extensive diplomatic activity between the Holy See and Taiwan.)

=== Apostolic nuncio/archbishop ===
On March 19, 2016, Pope Francis appointed Russell as apostolic nuncio to Turkey and titular archbishop of Novi. On June 3, 2016, Russell was consecrated in the Cathedral of the Holy Cross in Boston by Cardinal Seán O'Malley, with Archbishops Allen Vigneron and Leo Cushley serving as co-consecrators. The post of apostolic nuncio to Azerbaijan was added to Russell's responsibilities on April 7, 2018. Russell resigned his post as apostolic nuncio on February 2, 2022.

=== Archbishop Auxiliary Bishop of Detroit ===
On May 23, 2022, Pope Francis named Russell as an auxiliary bishop of Detroit, allowing him to keep the personal title of archbishop. On July 7, 2022, he began his role as auxiliary bishop. On the occasion when an archbishop in his own right is appointed bishop of a diocesan see, the archbishop is personally referred to as the "Archbishop Bishop of [See Name]." In Russell's very rare circumstance, as an archbishop in his own right being appointed as an auxiliary bishop, he was to be personally be referred to as an "Archbishop Auxiliary Bishop of Detroit."

On August 1, 2022, a lawsuit was filed in Massachusetts against Archbishop Russell alleging him of sexual misconduct. He denied all allegations against him, but in accordance with Vatican guidelines, he is not exercising public ministry until cleared to do so by the Holy See.

Russell has a devotion to his mother's cousin Michał Piaszczyński, a beatified priest who died in the Sachsenhausen concentration camp during World War II. Russell is fluent in French, Italian, Spanish, and German.

== See also ==
- Catholic Church hierarchy
- Catholic Church in the United States
- Historical list of the Catholic bishops of the United States
- List of Catholic bishops of the United States
- Lists of patriarchs, archbishops, and bishops
- List of heads of the diplomatic missions of the Holy See

== Episcopal succession ==
Catholic Church titles
Preceded by -	Archbishop Auxiliary Bishop of Detroit; 2022-Present	Succeeded by -
Preceded by Marek Solczyński	Apostolic Nuncio to Azerbaijan; 2018-2022	Succeeded by Marek Solczyński
Preceded by Antonio Lucibello	Apostolic Nuncio to Türkiye and Turkmenistan; 2016-2022	Succeeded by Marek Solczyński
Preceded by Ambrose Madtha	Chargé d’affaires to China; 2008-2016	Succeeded by Slađan Ćosić
