= Marek Solczyński =

Polish prelate of the Catholic Church

His Excellency, The Most Reverend Marek Solczyński
- Apostolic Nuncio to Turkey, Azerbaijan and Turkmenistan; Titular Archbishop of Caesarea in Mauretania
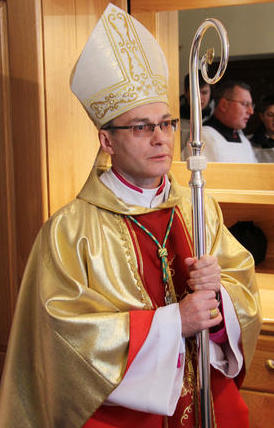
- Appointed: 2 February 2022
- Predecessor: Paul Fitzpatrick Russell
- Other post: Titular Archbishop of Caesarea in Mauretania
- Previous posts: Apostolic Nuncio to Tanzania (2017-2022); Apostolic Nuncio to Georgia, Armenia and Azerbaijan (2011-2017)

Orders
- Ordination: 28 May 1987 by cardinal Józef Glemp
- Consecration: 6 January 2012 by Pope Benedict XVI, Tarcisio Bertone and William Levada

Personal details
- Born: Marek Solczyński; April 7, 1961 (age 65) Stawiszyn, Poland
- Denomination: Roman Catholic
- Occupation: Nuncio
- Motto: Ecce Agnus Dei
- Coat of arms

Styles of Marek Solczyński
- Reference style: His Excellency; The Most Reverend
- Spoken style: Your Excellency
- Religious style: Archbishop

Marek Solczyński is a Polish prelate of the Catholic Church who joined the diplomatic service of the Holy See in 1993 and served as an Apostolic Nuncio since 2011. He has been Nuncio to Turkey and Azerbaijan since February 2022.

== Biography ==
After studying philosophy and theology, Solczyński was ordained a priest on 28 May 1987 by Cardinal Józef Glemp. He then worked as a chaplain in Józefów.

From 1990 to 1992, he completed his postgraduate studies at the Pontifical Ecclesiastical Academy, where he earned a doctorate in canon law.

== Diplomatic career ==
On 1 April 1993, he entered the diplomatic service of the Holy See. His early postings included Russia, the United Nations in New York City, the United States, Turkey, the Czech Republic and Spain.

Pope Benedict XVI appointed him on 26 November 2011 Titular Archbishop of Caesarea in Mauretania and Apostolic Nuncio to Georgia On 15 December he was named Nuncio to Armenia as well. He received his episcopal consecration from Pope Benedict on the 6 January 2012. On 14 April 2012 he was given the responsibilities of the Apostolic Nuncio to Azerbaijan.

On 25 April 2017, Pope Francis appointed him Apostolic Nuncio to Tanzania.

On 2 February 2022, Pope Francis appointed him Apostolic Nuncio to Turkey and, on 14 February 2022, to Azerbaijan also. On 8 September 2022 Pope Francis appointed him Apostolic Nuncio to Turkmenistan as well.

== See also ==
- List of heads of the diplomatic missions of the Holy See
