= Apostolic Nunciature to Azerbaijan =

Diplomatic Mission of the Holy See

The Apostolic Nunciature to Azerbaijan is an ecclesiastical office of the Catholic Church in Azerbaijan. It is headed by the Apostolic Nuncio, a member of the diplomatic service of the Holy See, who represents the interests of the Holy See to Church officials, the government, and civil society in Azerbaijan. It is a diplomatic post with the rank of ambassador.

Azerbaijan and the Holy See established diplomatic relations on 23 May 1992.

The title Apostolic Nuncio to Azerbaijan is held by the prelate appointed Apostolic Nuncio to Turkey; he resides in Turkey.

== Papal representatives to Azerbaijan ==
- Jean-Paul Gobel (15 January 1994 – 6 December 1997)
- Peter Stephan Zurbriggen (13 June 1998 – 25 October 2001)
- Claudio Gugerotti (13 December 2001 – 15 July 2011)
- Marek Solczyński (14 April 2012 – 25 April 2017)
- Paul Fitzpatrick Russell (7 April 2018 – 14 February 2022)
- Marek Solczyński (14 February 2022 – present)
