= Apostolic Nunciature to Turkey =

Diplomatic mission of the Holy See in Western Asia

The Apostolic Nunciature to Turkey is an ecclesiastical office of the Catholic Church in Turkey. It is a diplomatic post of the Holy See, whose representative is called the Apostolic Nuncio with the rank of an ambassador. The Apostolic Nuncio to Turkey is usually also the Apostolic Nuncio to Azerbaijan and Turkmenistan upon his appointment to said nations.

Papal representation in the area that later became Turkey was initiated with the creation of the Apostolic Delegation to Constantinople in 1868, at a time when the Holy See had largely ceded the management of Church affairs in the region to the French Catholic Church. It was renamed the Apostolic Delegation to Turkey in 1930. In anticipation of the establishment of diplomatic relations, Pope John XXIII created the Apostolic Internunciature to Turkey on 29 February 1960. Pope Paul VI raised it to the full status of Apostolic Nunciature on 30 August 1966.

== Representatives of the Holy See ==
Apostolic delegates to Constantinople

- Augusto Bonetti (6 May 1887 - 19 August 1904)
- Giovanni Tacci Porcelli (19 December 1904 – 31 December 1907)
- Vincenzo Sardi di Rivisondoli (6 April 1908 – 1914)
- Angelo Maria Dolci (10 June 1914 – December 1922)
- Ernesto Eugenio Filippi (31 March 1923 - 6 April 1925)
- Angelo Rotta (9 May 1925 – February/March 1930)
- Carlo Margotti (8 March 1930 – 25 July 1934)

Apostolic delegates to Turkey

- Angelo Roncalli (30 November 1934 - 22 December 1944)
- Alcide Marina (18 April 1945 - 22 March 1947)
- Andrea Cassulo (3 June 1947 - 9 January 1952)
- Paolo Bertoli (24 March 1952 - 7 May 1953)
- Giacomo Testa (18 June 1953 - 1959)

Apostolic delegate and internuncio to Turkey

- Francesco Lardone (30 June 1959 - 1966)
  - He became Internuncio with the erection of the Apostolic Internunciature to Turkey on 29 February 1960.

Apostolic pro-nuncios to Turkey

- Saverio Zupi (30 August 1966 - 17 May 1969)
- Salvatore Asta (7 June 1969 - 21 July 1984)

Apostolic nuncios to Turkey

- Sergio Sebastiani (8 January 1985 - 15 November 1994)
- Pier Luigi Celata (6 February 1995 - 3 March 1999)
- Luigi Conti (15 May 1999 - 8 August 2001)
- Edmond Farhat (11 December 2001 - 26 July 2005)
- Antonio Lucibello (27 August 2005 - 2015)
- Paul Fitzpatrick Russell (19 March 2016 - 22 October 2021)
- Marek Solczyński (2 Feb 2022–present)

== See also ==
- Holy See–Turkey relations
- Foreign relations of the Holy See
- List of diplomatic missions of the Holy See
