= Angelo Rotta =

Italian diplomat

- Titular Archbishop of Thebae; Apostolic Nuncio
- Previous posts: Apostolic Internuncio to Central America (1922–1923); Apostolic Internuncio to Panama (1923–1925); Apostolic Delegate to Turkey; (1925–1930); Apostolic Nuncio to Hungary (1930–1945)

Orders
- Ordination: 10 February 1895
- Consecration: 1 November 1922 by Pietro Gasparri

Personal details
- Born: Angelo Rotta; 9 August 1872 Milan, Italy
- Died: February 1, 1965 (aged 92) Vatican
- Occupation: Catholic prelate and diplomat

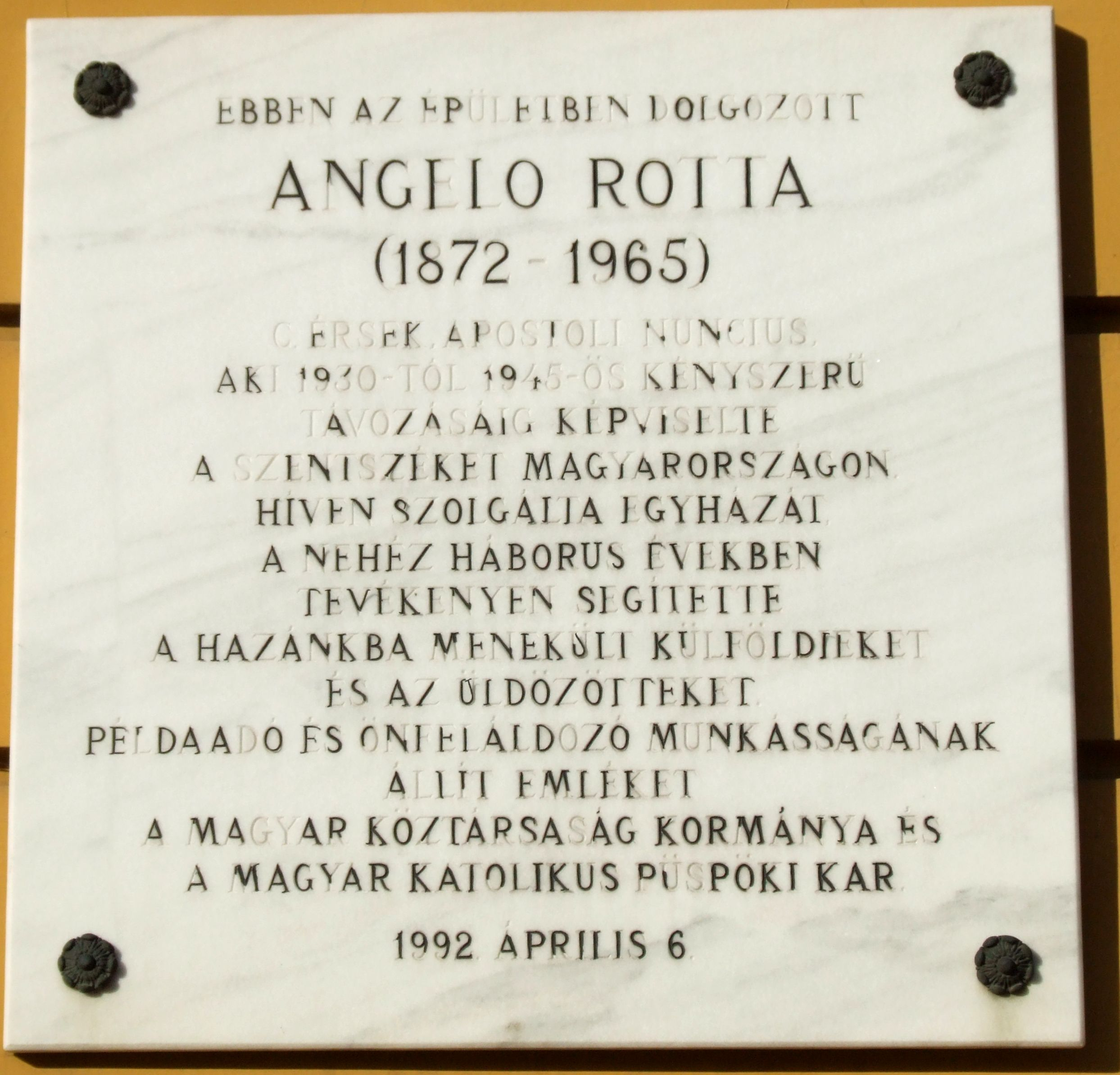
Angelo Rotta commemorative plaque in Budapest District I, Dísz Square No 4–5.

Angelo Rotta (9 August 1872 – 1 February 1965) was an Italian prelate of the Catholic Church. As the Apostolic Nuncio in Budapest at the end of World War II, he was involved in the rescue of the Jews of Budapest from the Nazi Holocaust. He is a significant figure in Catholic resistance to Nazism.

== Early years ==
Rotta was born in Milan, Italy, on 9 August 1872. He was ordained a priest on 10 February 1895.

On 16 October 1922, Pope Pius XI named him titular archbishop of Thebes and Apostolic Internuncio to Central America, which then covered Costa Rica, El Salvador, Honduras, and Nicaragua. He received his episcopal consecration from Cardinal Pietro Gasparri, the Vatican Secretary of State, on 1 November 1922. He was named Apostolic Internuncio to Panama as well on 21 September 1923 even as his responsibilities toward other countries in Central America continued. On 9 May 1925, Pope Pius appointed him Apostolic Delegate to Turkey.

During his diplomatic service in Bulgaria, he saved many Bulgarian Jews by issuing them baptismal certificates and safe conducts for the trip to Palestine.

== Nuncio to Hungary ==
On 20 March 1930, Pope Pius named him Apostolic Nuncio to Hungary, a position he held for fifteen years.

As Papal Nuncio representing Pope Pius XII in Hungary, Rotta actively protested Hungary's mistreatment of the Jews, and helped persuade Pope Pius XII to lobby the Hungarian leader Admiral Horthy to stop their deportation. According to historian of the Holocaust Martin Gilbert, "With Arrow Cross members killing Jews in the streets of Budapest, Angelo Rotta, the senior Vatican representative in Budapest, took a lead in establishing an "International Ghetto", consisting of several dozen modern apartment buildings to which large numbers of Jews - eventually 25,000 - were brought and to which the Swiss, Swedish, Portuguese, and Spanish legations, as well as the Vatican, affixed their emblems."

Rotta also got permission from the Vatican to begin issuing protective passes to Jewish converts - and was eventually able to distribute more than 15,000 such protective passes, while instructing the drafters of the documents not to examine the recipients' credentials too closely. A Red Cross official asked Rotta for pre-signed blank identity papers, to offer to the sick and needy fleeing the Arrow Cross, and was given the documents with Rotta's blessing. Rotta encouraged Hungarian church leaders to help their "Jewish brothers", and directed Fr Tibor Baranszky to go to the forced marches and distribute letters of immunity to as many Jews as he could.

In 1944 - 1945 Rotta contributed greatly to the saving action of the Neutral Powers (Portugal, Spain, Sweden, Switzerland, the Vatican) and the International Red Cross Committee in Budapest (initiated by Carl Lutz, and led, among others, by Giorgio Perlasca, Friedrich Born, Raoul Wallenberg, Angel Sanz Briz). As the Dean of the Diplomatic Corps, he vehemently protested several times to the Hungarian Governments against the Jewish Deportations.

On 15 November 1944, the Hungarian Government established the "Big Ghetto" for 69,000 Jews, while a further 30,000 with protective documents went to the International Ghetto. On 19 November 1944, the Vatican joined the four other neutral powers - Sweden, Spain, Portugal and Switzerland - in a further collective protest to the Hungarian Government calling for the suspension of deportations of the Jews. The government complied, and banned the "death marches" - but Budapest was by that stage near anarchy, and deportations continued from 21 November. The Arrow Cross continued their orgy of violence, raiding the international Ghetto and murdering Jews, as Soviet forces approached the city. Rotta and Wallenberg were among the few diplomats to remain in Budapest. Following the Soviet conquest of the city, Wallenberg was seized by the Russians and taken to Moscow, from where he was never released. Gilbert wrote that of the hundred and fifty thousand Jews who had been in Budapest when the Germans arrived in March 1944, almost 120,000 survived to liberation - 69,000 from the Big Ghetto, 25,000 in the International Ghetto and a further 25,000 hiding out in Christian homes and religious institutes across the city.

== Post-war ==
Rotta retired from diplomacy in 1957.

Pope Paul VI paid him a surprise visit at his Vatican residence on Easter Sunday in March 1964.

He was recognized as Righteous among the Nations by Yad Vashem in 1997.

In 2010 a section of embankment on the Buda side of the river Danube in Budapest (between Margaret Bridge and Batthyány Square) was named Angelo Rotta rakpart ("Angelo Rotta embankment") in his honour.

Catholic Church titles
| Preceded by Giovanni Battista Nasalli Rocca di Corneliano | Titular archbishop of Thebes; 1922–1965 | Vacant |
Diplomatic posts
| Preceded by Giovanni Battista Marenco | Apostolic Internuncio to Central America; 1922–1925 | Succeeded by Giuseppe Fietta |
| Preceded by Ernesto Eugenio Filippi | Apostolic Delegate to Turkey; 1925–1930 | Succeeded by Carlo Margotti |
| Preceded by Cesare Orsenigo | Apostolic Nuncio to Hungary; 1930–1945 | Vacant Title next held by Angelo Acerbi |
