= Giacomo Testa =

Italian prelate

The Most Reverend Giacomo Testa
- President of the Pontifical Ecclesiastical Academy
- Church: Roman Catholic Church
- Appointed: 22 June 1959
- Term ended: 29 September 1962
- Predecessor: Paolo Savino
- Successor: Gino Paro
- Other post: Titular Archbishop of Heraclea in Europa (1953-62)
- Previous posts: Apostolic Administrator of Constantinople (1953-59); Apostolic Delegate to Turkey (1953-59)

Orders
- Ordination: 6 December 1931
- Consecration: 26 August 1953 by Angelo Giuseppe Roncalli

Personal details
- Born: Giacomo Testa; 3 April 1909 Cenate Sotto, Bergamo, Kingdom of Italy
- Died: 29 September 1962 (aged 53) Cenate Sotto, Bergamo, Italy

Giacomo Testa (3 April 1909 – 29 September 1962) was an Italian prelate of the Catholic Church who worked in the diplomatic service of the Holy See and then headed its training program, the Pontifical Ecclesiastical Academy, from 1959 until his death at age 53 in 1962. Early in his diplomatic career, he worked closely with Archbishop Angelo Giuseppe Roncalli, who later as Pope John XXIII gave him his final appointment as President of the Academy.

== Biography ==
Giacomo Testa was born on 3 April 1909 in Cenate Sotto, Italy. He was ordained a priest on 6 December 1931.

As a junior member of the diplomatic service of the Holy See, some of his assignments tracked those of Archbishop Angelo Giuseppe Roncalli (the future Pope John XXIII), during his tenure as papal representative to Bulgaria (1931–1934), Turkey (1934–1944), and France (1944–1952). (Note: Testa was not always alongside Roncalli throughout these years. Roncalli notes Testa's departure from Turkey on 2 November 1939: "My dear secretary, Msgr. Giacomo Testa, left me finally to run his own course. He was a good lad and had been with me for over two years, and I loved him in the Lord. So be it.")

On 19 June 1953, Pope Pius XII named him titular archbishop of Heraclea in Europa and Apostolic Delegate to Turkey. He received his episcopal consecration on 26 August 1953 from Cardinal Angelo Roncalli.

On 22 June 1959, Pope John XXIII named him President of the Pontifical Ecclesiastical Academy. On 16 July he was appointed a consultor to the Congregation for the Oriental Churches and on 31 August a consultor to the Congregation for Religious.

He died on 29 September 1962 at the age of 53 in his home town of Cenate Sotto.
