= Francesco Lardone =

Italian-born prelate

Francesco Lardone (12 January 1887 – 30 January 1980) was an Italian-born prelate of the Catholic Church who became a U.S. citizen in 1937. He taught for 25 years at Catholic University in Washington, D.C., and then served in the diplomatic service of the Holy See as an Apostolic Nuncio and archbishop. He played a key role in arranging for bishops from the Communist-led countries of Eastern Europe to attend the Second Vatican Council.

== Biography ==
Francesco Lardone was born on 12 January 1887 in Moretta, Italy. He was ordained a priest on 29 June 1910. He earned his doctorate in theology at the Pontifical School of Theology, Turin, in 1909, and his doctorate in civil and canon law at the Pontifical School of Canon Law, Turin, in 1912. He also studied paleography and diplomacy at the Royal University of Turin.

He worked in parish ministry and then served as a Red Cross chaplain from 1915 to 1920. He was assistant editor of L'Osservatore Romano, the Vatican newspaper, from 1920 to 1923. He taught at Catholic University in Washington, D.C., from 1924 to 1949. He became an American citizen in 1937.

On 21 May 1949, Pope Pius XII named him titular archbishop of Rhizaeum and Apostolic Nuncio to both Haiti and the Dominican Republic. He received his episcopal consecration on 30 June 1949 from Archbishop Amleto Cicognani, Apostolic Nuncio to the United States, at the Shrine if the Immaculate Conception in Washington, D.C. On 21 November 1953, Pope Pius appointed him Apostolic Nuncio to Peru.

On 30 June 1959, Pope John XXIII named him Apostolic Delegate to Turkey. His title changed to Internuncio with the erection of the Apostolic Internunciature to Turkey on 29 February 1960. Pope John used him as an intermediary, first with the Russian Embassy in Ankara and then with the representatives of the other Eastern European countries there, to win the approval of those governments to allow their Catholic bishops to attend the Second Vatican Council. Pope John also considered making Lardone a cardinal in 1960. (Note: Archbishop Loris Francesco Capovilla, the pope's personal secretary, told an interviewer in June 2007 that Lardone refused the honor because he thought his diplomatic efforts to allow bishops from the Warsaw Pact nations to attend was more important. Pope John may have included Lardone as one of three cardinals named in pectore in 1960, but since the appointment was never announced Lardone remained an archbishop.)

Lardone retired in 1966. (Note: Saverio Zupi was named to succeed him in Turkey on 30 August 1966) He died on 30 January 1980 at his home in Moretta.

== Writings ==
- Una pagina di storia dei cappellani militari (in Italian). 1919.
- Airspace rights in Roman law. 1931.
- The imperial constitutions in the Institutes of Gaius. 1933.
- Il Diritto romano e i concilii (in Italian). 1935.
