= Sotto il Monte Giovanni XXIII =

Sotto il Monte Sóta 'l Mut (Lombard)
- Comune
- Città di Sotto il Monte Giovanni XXIII
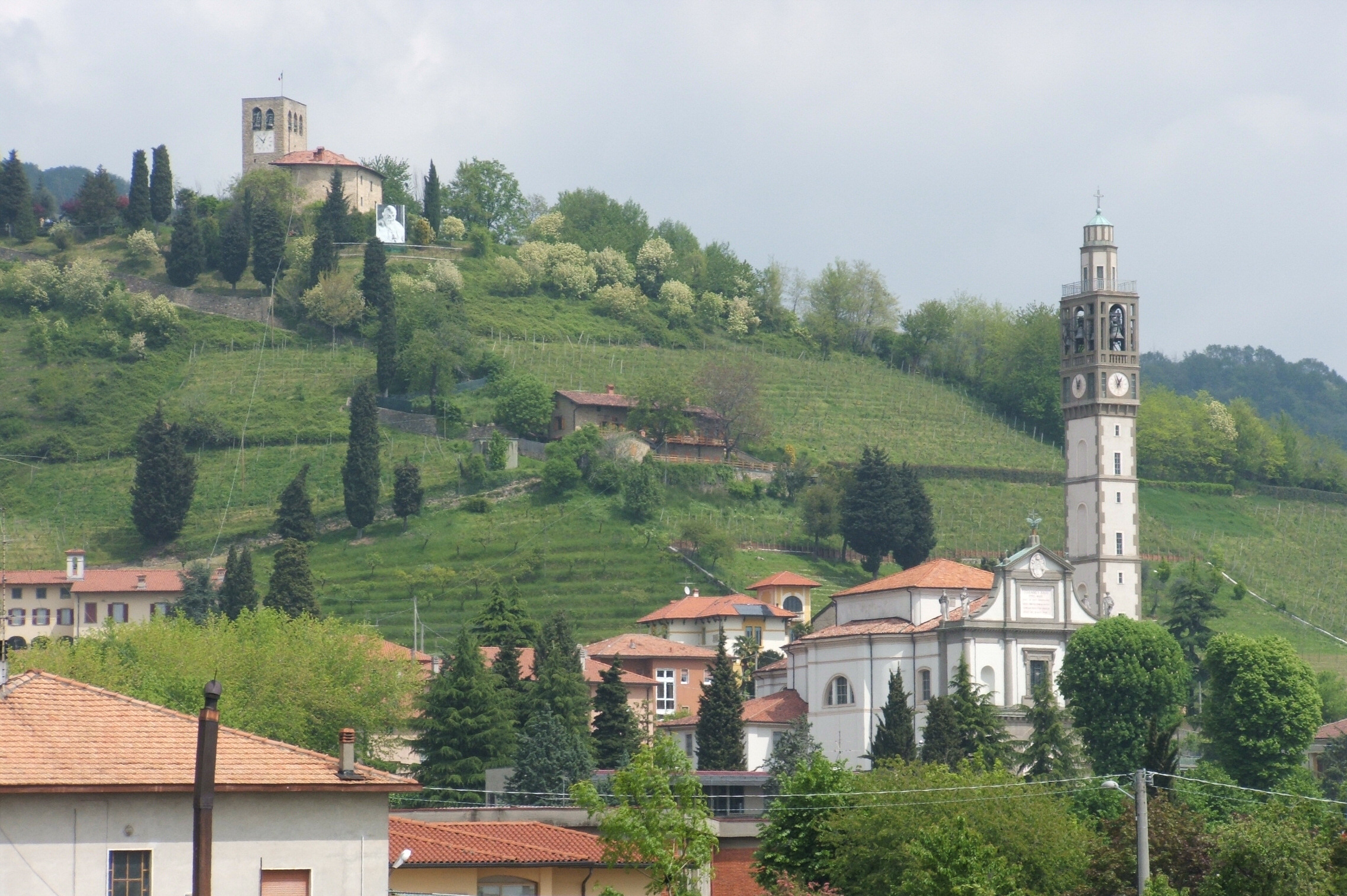
- Sotto il Monte Giovanni XXIII

- Coat of arms

- Location within Italy Location within Lombardy
- Coordinates: 45°42′20″N 9°29′54″E
- Country: Italy
- Region: Lombardy
- Province: Bergamo (BG)
- Frazioni: Botta, Brusicco, Fontanella, Pratolongo

Government
  - Mayor: Denni Chiappa

Area
  - Total: 5.02 km^{2} (1.94 sq mi)
- Elevation: 305 m (1,001 ft)

Population (30 November 2016)
  - Total: 4,498
  - Density: 896/km^{2} (2,320/sq mi)
- Demonym: Sottomontesi
- Time zone: UTC+1 (CET)
  - Summer (DST): UTC+2 (CEST)
- Postal code: 24039
- Dialing code: 035
- Patron saint: John the Baptist
- Saint day: 24 June
- Website: Official website

Sotto il Monte (Bergamasque: Sóta 'l Mut; "Under the Mountain"), officially Sotto il Monte Giovanni XXIII, is a comune in northern Italy. Located in the Province of Bergamo in the Region of Lombardy, the town's official name, much like that of Riese Pio X, commemorates the town's most famous son: Angelo Giuseppe Roncalli, who later became Pope John XXIII (Italian: Giovanni XXIII).

== Twin towns ==
Sotto il Monte Giovanni XXIII is twinned with:

- Marktl, Germany (birthplace of Pope Benedict XVI, 2009)
