= Carlo Margotti =

Italian Roman Catholic Church prelate

- Archbishop of Gorizia and Gradisca
- Church: Catholic Church
- Archdiocese: Archdiocese of Gorizia
- In office: 25 July 1934 – 31 July 1951
- Predecessor: Frančišek Borgia Sedej
- Successor: Giacinto Giovanni Ambrosi
- Previous posts: Apostolic Delegate to Greece (1931-1934); Titular Archbishop of Mesembria (1930-1934); Apostolic Delegate to Turkey (1930-1934)

Orders
- Ordination: 11 May 1915
- Consecration: 25 March 1930 by Luigi Sincero

Personal details
- Born: 22 April 1891 Alfonsine, Province of Ravenna, Kingdom of Italy
- Died: 31 July 1951 (aged 60) Gorizia, Province of Gorizia, Italy

Carlo Margotti (22 April 1891 – 31 July 1951) was an Italian prelate of the Catholic Church who worked in the Roman Curia, served in the diplomatic service of the Holy See, and was Archbishop of Gorizia and Gradisca for seventeen years.

== Biography ==
Carlo Margotti was born on 22 April 1891 in Alfonsine, Italy. He studied at the seminaries in Bologna and Rome and was ordained a priest of the Archdiocese of Bologna on 11 May 1915. From 1915 to 1923 his fulfilled pastoral assignments in Bologna. For part of that time, from October 1915 to September 1919, he also served in the Italian army using his knowledge of Slavic languages to censor mail. He taught at the Bologna seminary for two years and in October 1921 joined the staff of the Congregation for the Oriental Churches as secretary of its Russian section.

On 8 March 1930, Pope Pius XI named him titular archbishop of Mesembria and Apostolic Delegate to Constantinople. (Note: Peter Hebblewaite, in his biography of Pope John XXIII, describes Margotti in Constantinople as "something of a disaster".) He received his episcopal consecration on 25 March 1930 from Cardinal Luigi Sincero. On 12 February 1931, Pope Pius assigned him the additional responsibilities of the Apostolic Delegate to Greece.

On 25 July 1934, Pope Pius appointed him Archbishop of Gorizia. On 27 October 1934, Pope Pius named him a consultor to the Congregation for Oriental Churches.

He was the first Italian to lead the archdiocese after a succession of Slovenes and Austrians. Its territory had only been conjoined to Italy at the end of the First World War. He tried, with limited success, to meet the government's demands for imposing the Italian language against the resistance of his Slovene clergy. He was hampered in this situation by his personal preference for the Italian nationalist point of view. (Note: In a 1936 report he wrote of his vision for the Archdiocese: "one, one, Catholic, apostolic, Roman, strongly Roman and Italian".) He was arrested at gunpoint and expelled from Gorizia by Yugoslav troops in May 1945 during their brief occupation of the city. He returned after the end of World War II to an archdiocese that had lost almost two-thirds of its area with the redrawing of national boundaries.

He died in Gorizia on 31 July 1951 after a long illness at the age of 60.
