= Pier Luigi Celata =

Italian prelate of the Catholic Church

His Excellency, The Most Reverend Pier Luigi Celata
- Church: Roman Catholic Church
- Archdiocese: Doclea
- Appointed: 12 December 1985
- Installed: 6 January 1986
- Previous posts: Secretary of the Pontifical Council for Interreligious Dialogue (2002-2012); Vice-Camerlengo of the Apostolic Camera (2012-2014)

Orders
- Ordination: 8 October 1961
- Consecration: 6 January 1986 by John Paul II
- Rank: Archbishop

Personal details
- Born: 23 January 1937 (age 89) Pitigliano, Kingdom of Italy

Pier Luigi Celata (born 23 January 1937) is an Italian prelate of the Catholic Church who from July 2012 to December 2014 was Vice Camerlengo of the Holy Roman Church. He spent much of his career in the diplomatic service of the Holy See. He became an archbishop in 1986 and from 1986 to 2002 was Apostolic Nuncio to several countries.

== Biography ==
He was born in Pitigliano, in province of Grosseto, on 23 January 1937. On 8 October 1961 he was ordained a priest for Diocese of Pitigliano.

On 12 December 1985 Pope John Paul II named him Titular Archbishop of Doclea and apostolic nuncio to Malta. He received his episcopal consecration on 6 January 1986 from Pope John Paul II. On 7 May 1988 he was also named Nuncio to the Republic of San Marino, and on 26 June 1992 also Nuncio to Slovenia.

On 6 February 1995 he was transferred to the Apostolic Nunciature to Turkey, and on 3 April 1997 he was also appointed Nuncio to Turkmenistan. On 3 March 1999 he became Nuncio to Belgium and Luxembourg.

On 14 November 2002 he was appointed secretary of the Pontifical Council for Interreligious Dialogue, a post he held until he was replaced on 30 June 2012 by Miguel Ayuso Guixot. On 21 December 2002, Pope John Paul II made him a member of the Pontifical Council for the Pastoral Care of Migrants.

On 5 March 2012, Pope Benedict XVI made him a member of the Pontifical Council for Promoting the New Evangelization. On 23 July 2012, Pope Benedict XVI appointed him Vice Camerlengo of the Holy Roman Church and on 28 July he was named a member of the Congregation for Bishops.

On 20 December 2014, he was replaced as Vice Camerlengo by Archbishop Giampiero Gloder and retired a month before his 78th birthday.
