= Edmond Farhat =

Lebanese prelate

- Apostolic Nuncio to Austria
- Native name: إدموند فرحات
- Church: Catholic Church
- In office: 26 July 2005 – 14 January 2009
- Predecessor: Giorgio Zur
- Successor: Peter Stephan Zurbriggen
- Other post: Titular Archbishop of Byblus (1989-2016)
- Previous posts: Apostolic Nuncio to Turkmenistan & Turkey (2001-2005); Apostolic Nuncio to North Macedonia & Slovenia (1995-2001); Apostolic Pro-Nuncio to Tunisia & Algeria (1989-1995); Apostolic Delegate to Libya (1989-1995)

Orders
- Ordination: 28 March 1959 by Émile Blanchet
- Consecration: 20 October 1989 by Pope John Paul II

Personal details
- Born: 20 May 1933 Ain Kfaa (northwest of Bejjeh), Mandatory Republic of Lebanon, French Empire
- Died: 17 December 2016 (aged 83) Rome, Italy

Edmond Farhat (20 May 1933 – 17 December 2016) was a Lebanese prelate of the Catholic Church who spent his career in the diplomatic service of the Holy See.

== Biography ==
Farhat was born in Ain Kfaa, Lebanon, on 20 May 1933. On 28 March 1959, the Maronite Patriarch of Antioch Paul Peter Meouchi ordained him a priest. He earned degrees in theology, philosophy and canon law in Paris and Rome and a doctorate in theology.

From 1967 to 1989 he worked as undersecretary of the Synod of Bishops in Rome and from 1970 to 1989 as Professor of Islamic Law at the University of Sassari.

On 26 August 1989, Pope John Paul II appointed him Apostolic Delegate to Libya, Apostolic Pro-Nuncio to Tunisia and Algeria, and titular archbishop of Byblus. On 20 October 1989 Farhat was consecrated a bishop by Pope John Paul. His co-consecrators were Edward Cassidy and Francesco Colasuonno. On 26 July 1995, he was named Nuncio to Slovenia and Macedonia.

He worked as mediator of diplomatic relations between the Sovereign Military Order of Malta and Macedonia, which thus the Order officially recognized. On 11 December 2001 he was named nuncio to Turkmenistan and Turkey. In Turkey his advocacy for Turkish membership in the European Union resulted in warnings that he was failing to comply with Turkish law limited the role of religion in civic affairs.

On 26 July 2005 he was appointed apostolic nuncio to Austria.

On 14 January 2009, Pope Benedict XVI accepted Farhat's resignation as Apostolic Nuncio to Austria. On 22 December 2009, Pope Benedict named him a member of the Congregation for the Causes of Saints.

He died in Rome on 17 December 2016.

== Honours ==
- Honorary conventual of the Sovereign Military Order of Malta
- Grand Officer of the Order of Merit of the Italian Republic (2008)
- Grand Decoration of Honour in Gold with Sash for Services to the Republic of Austria (2009)

== Works ==
- Gerusalemme nei documenti Pontifici from 1887 to 1984. Libreria Editrice Vaticana, Rome, 1987, ISBN 88-209-1664-9.
