= Santos Abril y Castelló =

Spanish prelate of the Catholic Church (born 1936)

His Eminence Santos Abril y Castelló
- Cardinal; Archpriest emeritus, Basilica di Santa Maria Maggiore
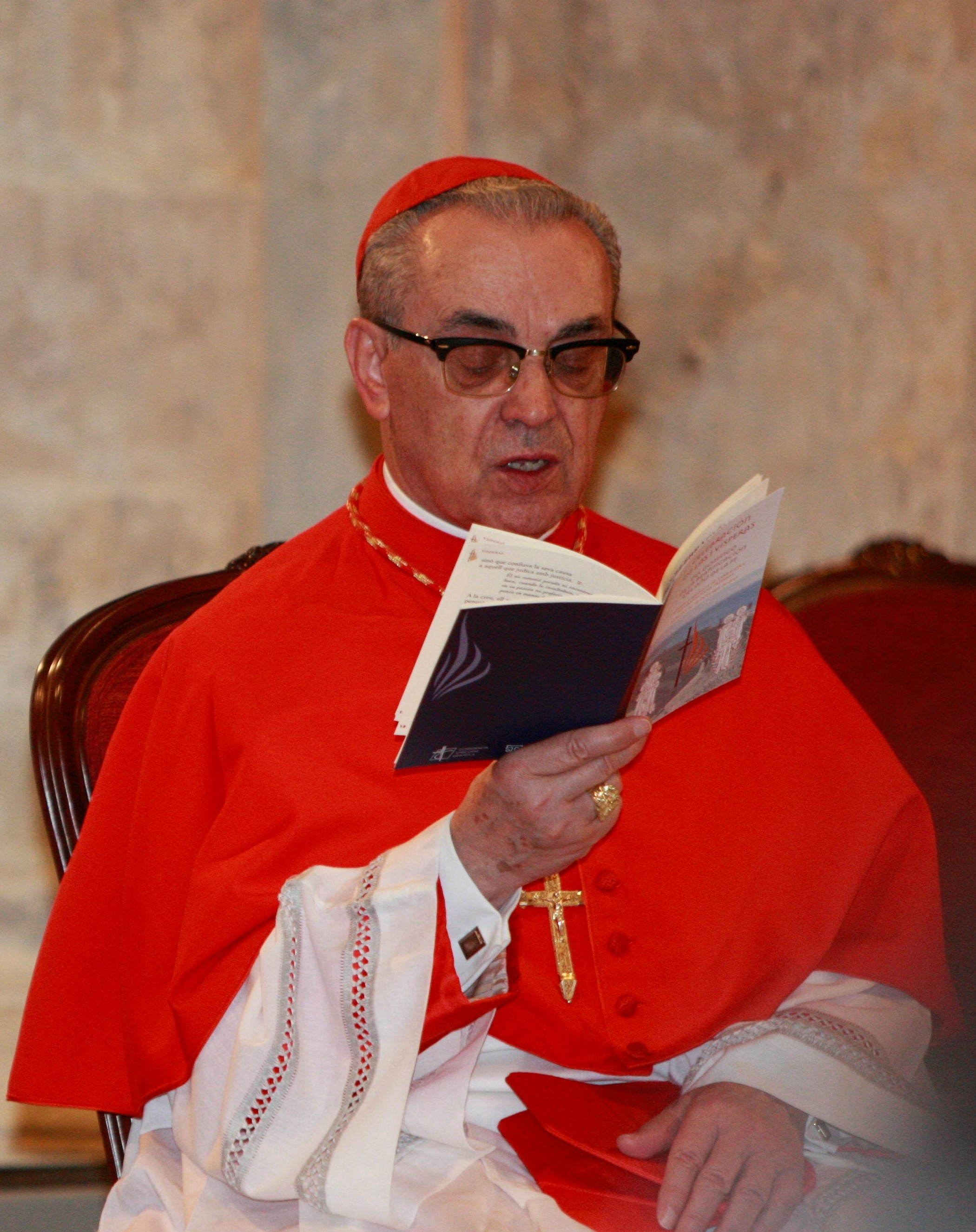
- The cardinal in 2013.
- Church: Roman Catholic Church
- Appointed: 21 November 2011
- Term ended: 28 December 2016
- Predecessor: Bernard Francis Law
- Successor: Stanislaw Rylko
- Other posts: Cardinal priest of San Ponziano, Titular Archbishop of Tamada
- Previous posts: Apostolic Nuncio to Bolivia (1985–1989); Apostolic Pro-Nuncio to Cameroon (1989–1996); Apostolic Pro-Nuncio to Gabon (1989–1996); Apostolic Pro-Nuncio to Equatorial Guinea (1989–1996); Apostolic Nuncio to Yugoslavia (1996–2000); Apostolic Nuncio to Argentina (2000–2003); Apostolic Nuncio to Slovenia (2003–2011); Apostolic Nuncio to Bosnia and Herzegovina (2003–2005); Apostolic Nuncio to Macedonia (2003–2011); Vice Camerlengo of the Apostolic Camera (2011–2012)

Orders
- Ordination: 19 March 1960
- Consecration: 16 June 1985 by Agostino Casaroli
- Created cardinal: 18 February 2012 by Benedict XVI
- Rank: Cardinal deacon (2012–22); Cardinal priest (2022–present)

Personal details
- Born: Santos Abril y Castelló; 21 September 1936 (age 89) Alfambra, Spain
- Denomination: Roman Catholic
- Motto: Pro Ecclesia cum Petro (For the church with Peter)
- Coat of arms

Styles of Santos Abril y Castelló
- Reference style: His Eminence
- Spoken style: Your Eminence
- Informal style: Cardinal

Santos Abril y Castelló (born 21 September 1935) is a Spanish prelate of the Catholic Church. After a career in the diplomatic corps of the Holy See, he held a number of positions in the Roman Curia and from 2011 to 2016 was Archpriest of the Basilica of Santa Maria Maggiore.

== Biography ==
Abril y Castelló was born in Alfambra, Spain, on 21 September 1935. He was ordained a priest for the diocese of Teruel and Albarracín on 19 March 1960. In 1961, he went to Rome to study and obtained a doctorate in social sciences at the Pontifical University of Saint Thomas Aquinas, Angelicum and a doctorate in canon law at the Pontifical Gregorian University. He attended the Pontifical Ecclesiastical Academy in Rome.

Joining he diplomatic service of the Holy See, he worked in Pakistan, Turkey and the Second Section of the Secretariat of State in Rome. On 29 April 1985, Pope John Paul II named him Apostolic Nuncio to Bolivia and Titular Archbishop of Tamada. He received his episcopal consecration on 16 June 1985 from Cardinal Secretary of State Agostino Casaroli. Pope John Paul named him apostolic pro-nuncio to Cameroon, to Gabon, and to Equatorial Guinea on 2 October 1989 and nuncio to Yugoslavia on 24 February 1996. On 4 March 2000 he named him nuncio to Argentina. On 9 April 2003, he named him nuncio to both Slovenia and Bosnia-Herzegovina, to which he added the title nuncio to Macedonia on 12 April.

On 22 January 2011, Pope Benedict named him Vice-Camerlengo of the Apostolic Chamber, the official responsible controlling access to papal conclaves and overseeing their operations.

On 2 April 2011 he was appointed a member of the Congregation for Bishops.

On 21 November 2011 he was named Archpriest of the Basilica of St. Mary Major.

On 18 February 2012 Pope Benedict raised him to the rank of cardinal, making him Cardinal-Deacon of San Ponziano.

On 21 April 2012 he was appointed a member of the Congregation for the Causes of Saints, the Congregation for Bishops and the Congregation for the Evangelization of Peoples.

On 23 July 2012, Pope Benedict XVI named Archbishop Pier Luigi Celata to succeed him as Vice-Camerlengo.

He was one of the cardinal electors who participated in the 2013 papal conclave that elected Pope Francis. The day before the election of Pope Francis, La Stampa named Abril y Costello as a possible candidate for the papacy because he combined experience in both Latin American and the Roman Curia. The newspaper also reported that before the conclave Abril served as a mediator in discussions between factions of cardinals representing Latin America and others looking for a pope from outside the Curia.

On 15 January 2014, he was named to a five-year term as a member of the Commission of Cardinals overseeing the Institute for the Works of Religion (IOR), commonly known as the Vatican Bank, and on 4 March 2014, the members of that Commission elected him as their president.

His curial appointments ended when he reached the age of 80, as did his right to vote in a papal conclave.

On 28 December 2016, Pope Francis accepted his resignation as Archpriest and appointed Cardinal Stanislaw Rylko to succeed him.

On 4 March 2022, he was elevated to the rank of cardinal priest.

Diplomatic posts
Preceded by Alfio Rapisarda	Apostolic Nuncio to Bolivia; 29 April 1985 – 2 October 1989	Succeeded by Giovanni Tonucci
Preceded by Donato Squicciarini	Apostolic Pro-Nuncio to Cameroon; 2 October 1989 – 24 February 1996	Succeeded by Ernesto Gallina
Preceded by Donato Squicciarini	Apostolic Pro-Nuncio to Gabon; 2 October 1989 – 24 February 1996	Succeeded by Luigi Pezzuto
Preceded by Donato Squicciarini	Apostolic Pro-Nuncio to Equatorial Guinea; 2 October 1989 – 24 February 1996	Succeeded by Félix del Blanco Prieto
Preceded by Ettore Felici	Apostolic Nuncio to Yugoslavia; 24 February 1996 – 4 March 2000	Succeeded by Eugenio Sbarbaro
Preceded by Ubaldo Calabresi	Apostolic Nuncio to Argentina; 4 March 2000 – 9 April 2003	Succeeded by Adriano Bernardini
Preceded by Giuseppe Leanza	Apostolic Nuncio to Bosnia and Herzegovina; 9 April 2003 – 21 November 2005	Succeeded by Alessandro D'Errico
Preceded by Giuseppe Leanza	Apostolic Nuncio to Macedonia; 9 April 2003 – 22 January 2011	Succeeded by Janusz Bolonek
Preceded by Giuseppe Leanza	Apostolic Nuncio to Slovenia; 9 April 2003 – 22 January 2011	Succeeded by Janusz Bolonek
Catholic Church titles
Preceded by Antônio Carlos Mesquita	— TITULAR — Titular Archbishop of Tamada; 29 April 1985 – 18 February 2012	Succeeded by Aldo Giordano
Preceded by Paolo Sardi	Vice-Camerlengo of the Apostolic Camera; 22 January 2011 – 23 July 2012	Succeeded by Pier Luigi Celata
Preceded by Bernard Francis Law	Archpriest of the Basilica di Santa Maria Maggiore; 21 November 2011 – 28 December 2016	Succeeded by Stanisław Ryłko
Preceded by Urbano Navarrete Cortés	Cardinal-Deacon of San Ponziano; 18 February 2012 –	Incumbent
Position created	President of the Commission of Cardinals for the Institute for Works of Religion; 4 March 2014 –	Incumbent
