= Hilta =

See St Kilda, Scotland for the island also referred to as Hilta

Hilta was an ancient city and former bishopric in Roman Africa, in the north of modern Tunisia. It is now a Latin Catholic titular see.

== History ==
Hilta was important enough in the Roman province of Africa Proconsularis to become a bishopric but later faded, presumably under the 7th century advent of Islam.

It has had three historically documented bishops :

- Participants in the Council of Carthage in 411, included for Hilta the Catholic Hilarianus and the Donatist heretic Victor, whose schismatic party was firmly condemned.
- Pariator took part in the council of Carthage in 646 against monothelitism.

=== Titular see ===
The diocese was nominally restored in 1933 as a Latin Catholic titular bishopric of Hilta (Latin) / Ilta (Curiate Italian) / Hilten(sis) (Latin adjective).

It has had the following incumbents, so far of the fitting Episcopal (lowest) rank :

- Norberto Forero y García (1951.07.07 – 1956.05.27) as Auxiliary Bishop of Diocese of Nueva Pamplona (Colombia) (1951.07.07 – 1956.05.27); later Bishop of Santa Marta (Colombia) (1956.05.27 – retired 1971.06.02), died 1981
- Napoléon-Alexandre Labrie, Eudists (C.I.M.) (1956.12.07 – resigned 1970.11.23) as emeritate, died 1973; previously Titular Bishop of Limata (1938.03.30 – 1945.12.22) as last Apostolic Vicar of Golfe Saint-Laurent (Canada) (1938.03.30 – 1945.11.24), (see) promoted as first Bishop of Golfe Saint-Laurent (now Diocese of Baie-Comeau) (1945.11.24 – 1956.12.07)
- Józef Kazimierz Kluz (1972.05.12 – death 1982.12.05) as Auxiliary Bishop of Diocese of Gdańsk (Danzig, Poland) (1972.05.12 – 1982.12.05)
- Rafael Eleuterio Rey (1983.04.30 – 1991.12.18) as Auxiliary Bishop of Archdiocese of Mendoza (Argentina) (1983.04.30 – 1991.12.18); later Bishop of Zárate-Campana (Argentina) (1991.12.18 – retired 2006.02.03)
- Thomas Nguyễn Văn Trâm (1992.03.06 – 2005.11.22) as Auxiliary Bishop of Xuân Lộc (Vietnam) (1992.03.06 – 2005.11.22); later first Bishop of daughter see Bà Rịa (Vietnam) (2005.11.22 – retired 2017.05.06)
- Jean-Abdo Arbach, Basilian Chouerite Order of Saint John the Baptist (B.C.) (2006.10.17 – 2006.11.11), as Apostolic Exarch of Argentina of the Greek-Melkites (2006.10.17 – 2012.06.23), as such next Titular Bishop of Palmyra of the Greek-Melkites (2006.11.11 – 2012.06.23), later Metropolitan Archbishop of Homs of the Greek-Melkites (Syria) (2012.06.23 – ...)
- Christophe Zoa (2006.11.30 – 2008.12.04) as Auxiliary Bishop of Archdiocese of Yaoundé (Cameroon) (2006.11.30 – 2008.12.04); later Bishop of Sangmélima (Cameroon) (2008.12.04 – ...)
- Gérald Cyprien Lacroix, Secular Institute Pius X (I.S.P.X.) (2009.04.07 – 2011.02.22) as Auxiliary Bishop of Quebec (Canada) (2009.04.07 – 2011.02.22), later succeeding as Metropolitan Archbishop of Quebec (2011.02.22 – ...), created Cardinal-Priest of S. Giuseppe all’Aurelio (2014.02.22 [2014.06.22] – ...)
- John Sherrington (2011.06.30 – 2025.04.05), as Auxiliary Bishop of Westminster (England, UK) (2011.06.30 – 2025.04.05), later succeeding as Metropolitan Archbishop of Liverpool (2025.04.05 - ...)
- Relwendé Kisito Ouédraogo (2026.01.28 - present), as Apostolic Nuncio

== Sources and external links ==
- GigaCatholic with titular incumbent biography links

Bibliography

- Pius Bonifacius Gams, Series episcoporum Ecclesiae Catholicae, Leipzig 1931, p. 466
- Stefano Antonio Morcelli, Africa christiana, Volume I, Brescia 1816, p. 179
