= The Entity (intelligence service) =

Intelligence service of the Holy See

- L’Entità
- Emblem of the Holy See

Service overview
- Formed: 1566; 460 years ago
- Type: Intelligence service
- Jurisdiction: Holy See
- Headquarters: Vatican City
- Motto: Cum cruce et gladio (Latin: "With the cross and the sword")
- Employees: Pontifical secret
- Annual budget: Pontifical secret
- Parent department: Roman Curia

The Entity, (Note: Italian: L’Entità) also known as the Servizio di Intelligence Vaticano (SIV) is the principal intelligence service of the Holy See, the governing body of the Catholic Church and the Vatican City State.

Founded by Pope Pius V in 1566, the Entity is the oldest intelligence service in the world. It is a component of the Roman Curia tasked with clandestine human intelligence and covert action, mitigating threats to the physical and ideological security of the Church. Its efforts are concerned as much with global conflict and threats against Church leaders, as with schisms, heresy, and mitigating the influences of Communism and Americanism. Across its more than 450-year history, the service is alleged to have engaged in assassinations, coups, terrorism financing, and market manipulation. Before 1930, the organization was known as the Holy Alliance (Italian: Santa Alleanza).

The Entity is the foreign intelligence counterpart to the counterintelligence and security service known as Sodalitium Pianum (SP). Although the Church has never acknowledged the existence of either, their existence is regarded as an open secret among Vatican insiders. In a 2010 issue of Studies in Intelligence, a CIA reviewer stated: "The Holy See denies that either exists. The Vatican archives and other reliable sources...suggest otherwise."

== Mission and structure ==
For the Entity, intelligence requirements are defined by Papal policy objectives: according to journalist Eric Frattini, "Papal policies have always set the objectives; the Holy Alliance has been a powerful instrument for carrying them out."

Little is known of the way the Entity recruits, though the Entity is reported to train the "cream of the crop of the Roman Catholic Church’s priests" who are sent to the organization by their bishops. For those recruited, the Pontifical Ecclesiastical Academy, near Piazza della Minerva in Rome, serves as the Vatican's "softer equivalent to the CIA’s Camp Peary." It is unclear if the Entity trains laity. The Entity reportedly maintains a global network with fixed assignments within the 162 legations where there are Vatican nunciatures (ambassadors).

=== Relationship with Italian intelligence ===
Although the Vatican is an enclave entirely within Italy, the two have not historically collaborated in intelligence efforts. Following the Lateran Treaty in 1929, Italian intelligence services infiltrated agents into the Vatican, advancing efforts to coordinate anticommunist alliances with western powers including the United States and the United Kingdom. For many years, the service was reported to have only occasional exchanges with the Italian intelligence services, though that reportedly reversed in recent years, with the Vatican realizing a greater need to adopt increasingly standardized European norms for security and intelligence capabilities.

== Early history (1566–1900) ==
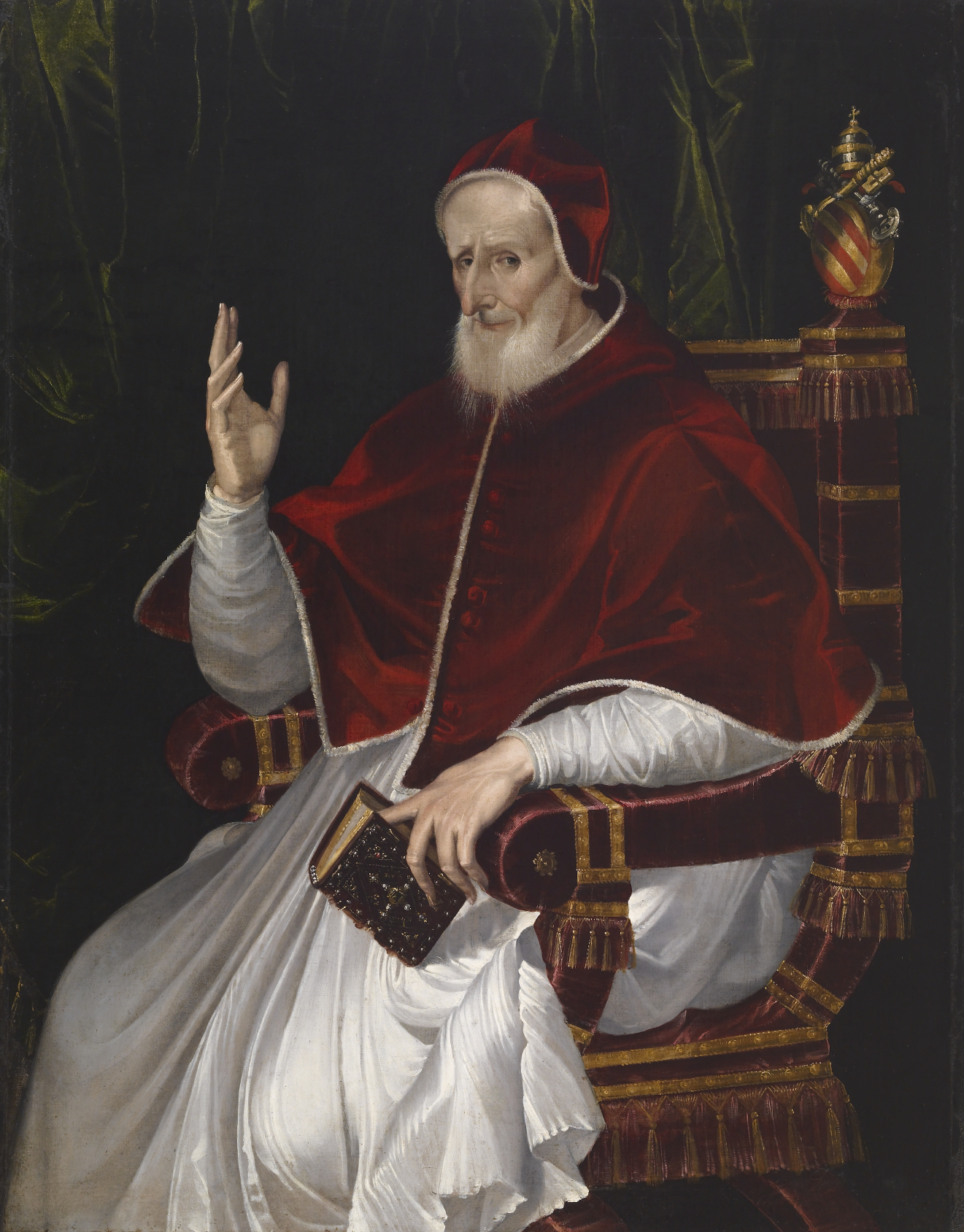
Pope Pius V created the Holy Alliance in 1566 to depose Elizabeth I.

The Entity was founded as the Holy Alliance in 1566 by Pope Pius V, in order to gather intelligence from the court of Elizabeth I, deemed to be a heretic, and overthrow her in favor of Mary, Queen of Scots, a practicing Catholic. Pius selected Cardinal Marcantonio Maffei (1521–1583) to serve as the organization's inaugural director.

Throughout its existence, the Entity has been involved in covert and clandestine operations in defense of Catholicism and the interests of the Vatican: it was reportedly involved in the fight against the French Huguenots; in the assassination of William I of Orange, and interfered on behalf of Catholic interests during the War of the Spanish Succession. It undermined the policies of the Cardinals Richelieu and Mazarin. It was allegedly involved in the attack against King Joseph I of Portugal, in the conspiracies against Napoleon Bonaparte, as well as in the fight against the Carboneria in Italy.

== 20th-century history ==
=== World War II ===
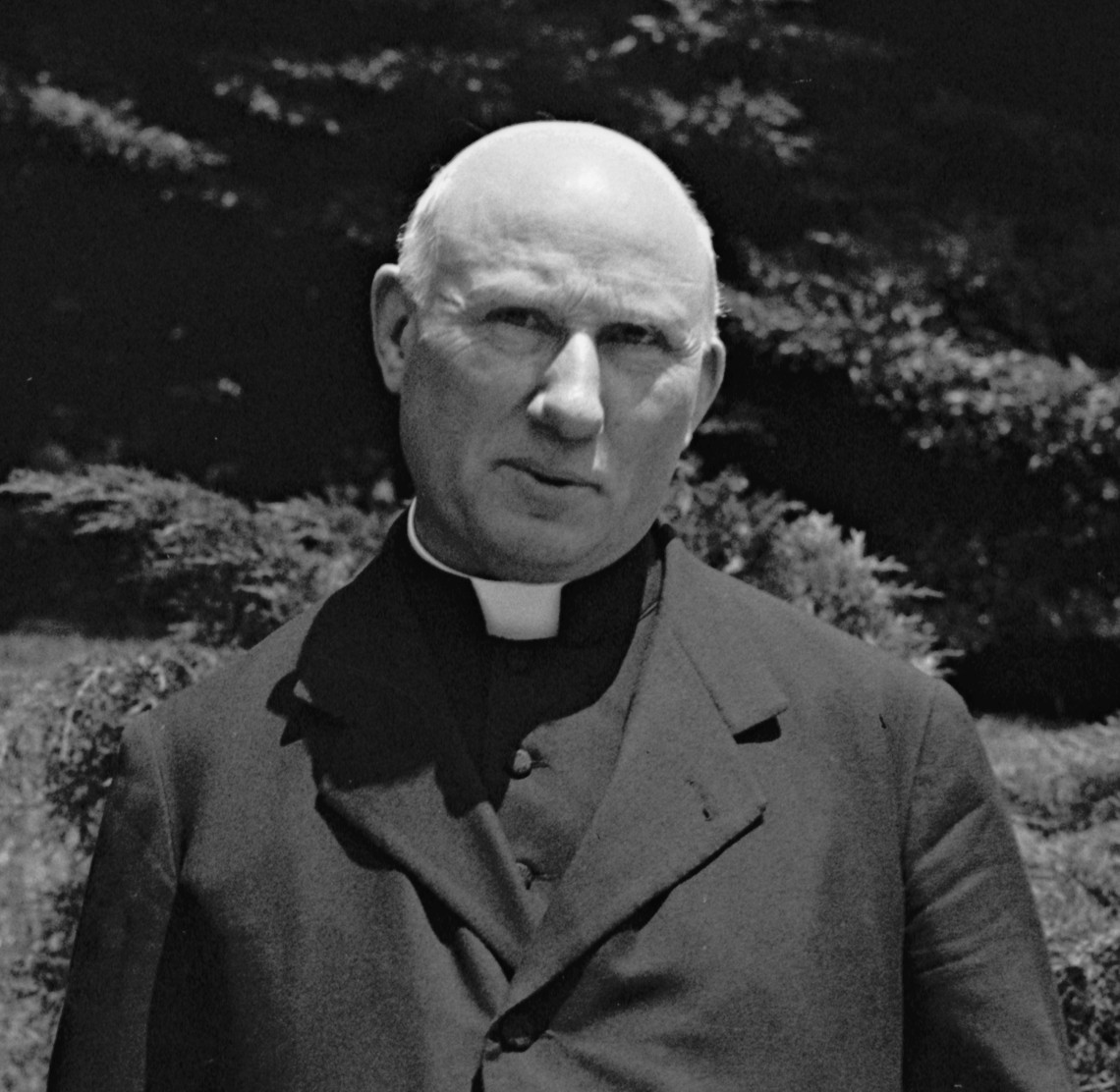
Cardinal Pietro Fumasoni Biondi led the Entity until his death in 1960.

During and after World War II, the Vatican of Pius XII lacked the resources and desire to compete globally for intelligence. The Papacy's access to information during World War II has been compared to that of Mexico or Portugal.

Following the war, the Entity was often connected to the exfiltration of Nazi and Croatian fascist Ustaše leaders into South America following the end of World War II. The Entity's capacity and secrecy led the famed Nazi hunter Simon Wiesenthal to describe it as "the best and most effective espionage service I know in the world."

=== Cold War ===
Under the pontificate of John XXIII (1958–1963), the Entity is believed to have fallen into relative hiatus, as the Pope did not appoint a successor upon the death of Entity director Pietro Fumasoni Biondi in 1960. Despite the reported lull, less than three years later his successor Paul VI (1963–1978) would take over, seeking to greatly expand the Entity's activities.

By the 1970s, Cardinal Luigi Poggi, spymaster under Pope John Paul II, saw the need to modernize the intelligence service for the 20th century. He fostered relationships with the Israeli Mossad and the American CIA, among other services. The Entity played a major role in John Paul II's prioritization of anticommunist efforts. In its collaboration with the U.S., however, the Vatican received more information from the CIA than it provided.

==== 1973: Black September assassination attempt ====
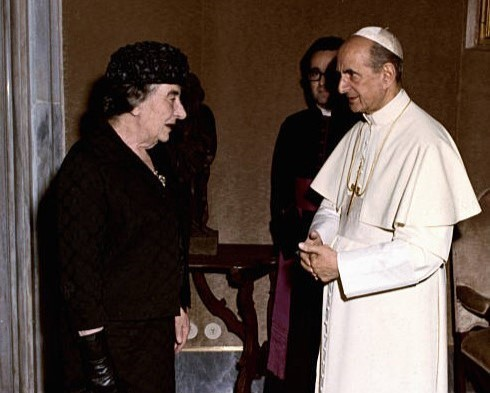
Israeli Prime Minister Golda Meir meeting Pope Paul VI following an assassination attempt in Rome.

On January 1, 1973, the Black September Organization attempted an attack on the Prime Minister of Israel during a visit to Italy. The plot involved operatives of the Soviet-backed Black September group, led by Ali Hassan Salameh, shipping Russian-built Strela-2 MANPADS by fishing boat down the Adriatic from Dubrovnik to the Italian city of Bari. From there, they were trucked to Fiumicino Airport in Rome, mounted in a station wagon, intended to assassinate prime minister Golda Meir before her meeting with Pope Paul VI. Through cooperation between The Entity and the Mossad, in particular Mossad director Zvi Zamir and CIA-trained papal intelligence officer Father Carlo Jacobini, the plot was disrupted when the pair rammed the station wagon fitted with the missiles. The terrorists in the vehicle were detained, and turned over to the Divisione Investigazioni Generali e Operazioni Speciali (DIGOS), the Italian counterterrorism police.

The service has reportedly made repeated entreaties to resolve the Israeli–Palestinian conflict.

==== 1970's: China ====
The Entity reportedly played a role in mediating between China and the United States during the Sino-Soviet split in the 1970s.

==== 1980s: Covert operations in Poland ====
In November 1981, Colonel Ryszard Kuklinski (cryptonym QT/GULL), a NATO spy in the General Staff of the Polish People's Army, warned of plans by Polish leader Wojciech Jaruzelski to impose martial law. When revelations about the planned repression emerged prior to its imposition on December 12, Kuklinski fell under suspicion and had to be extracted. Father Kazimierz Przydatek, an Entity agent, in concert with the Canadian Catholic curia and the CIA, secreted Kuklinski and his family into the Canadian Embassy in Warsaw, before they were ultimately resettled in the West.

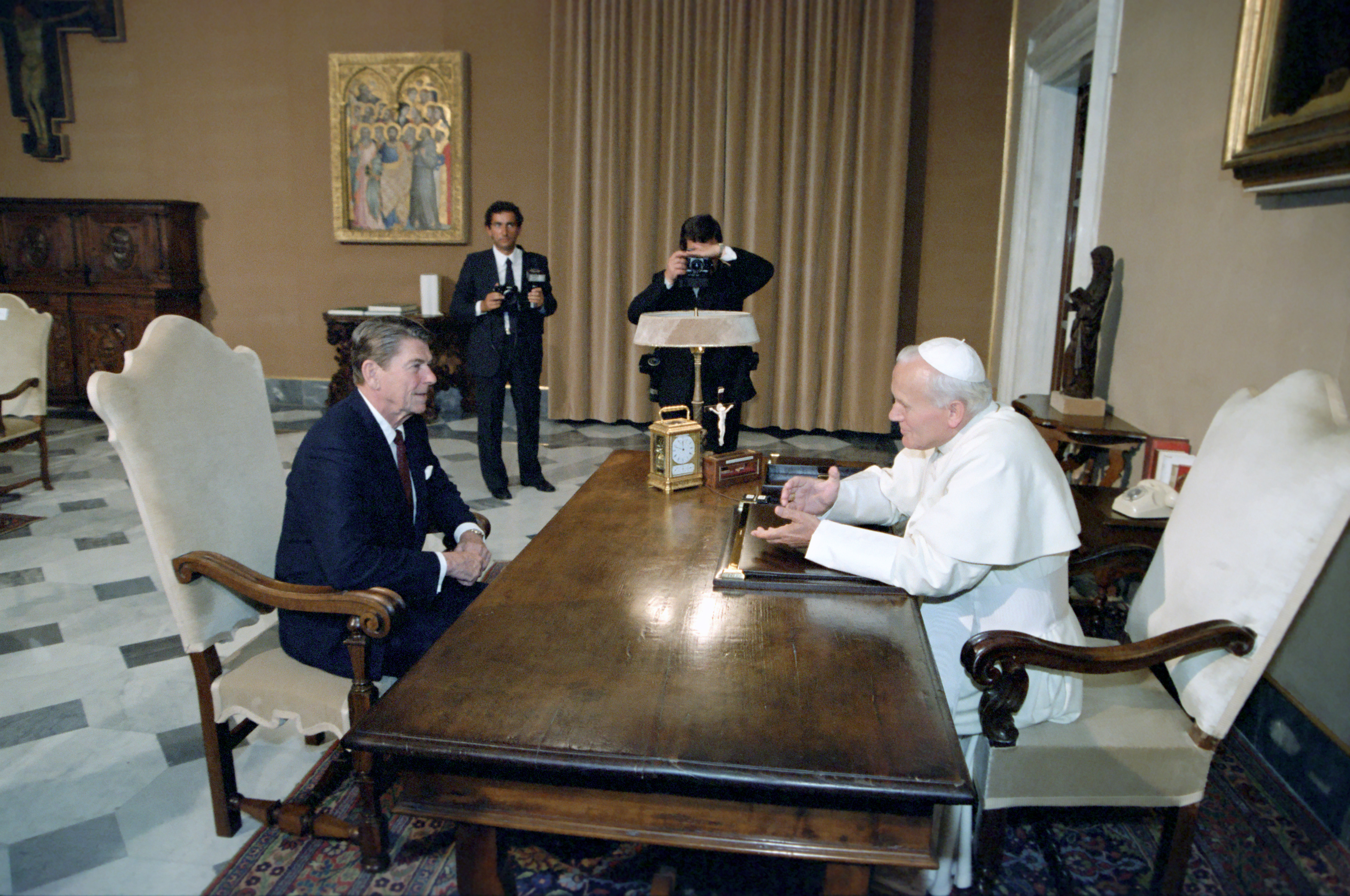
Pope John Paul II and U.S. President Ronald Reagan during the 1982 meeting where they agreed to covert support of Solidarity.

==== Carlos the Jackal ====
The Entity was reportedly one among a long list of western intelligence services seeking to capture or kill Carlos the Jackal, who was eventually located by Billy Waugh of the CIA in Khartoum, Sudan, where he was captured by the French DGSE.

==== 1995: Algerian Civil War ====
In 1995, the Entity was involved in an attempt to end the Algerian Civil War during the Sant'Egidio Platform, which successfully brought the military regime, the political opposition, and various Islamist opposition groups to the table, but ultimately failed to secure a peace deal.

== Modern activities ==
Pope Francis is understood to have chosen a member of the Argentinian laity, José Luis Uboldi to lead the Entity. Uboldi was a trusted confidant of the late Rubén Héctor di Monte, Archbishop of the Mercedes-Luján in Buenos Aires, with whom the Pope shared a close friendship. Uboldi is an enigmatic figure sometimes described as an eminence grise to Francis. He is rumored to be a former intelligence officer of the Argentine intelligence services and a veteran of the Falklands War. According to one source, Pope Francis assigned Uboldi and the Entity to support two priority policy objectives for Latin American affairs: thawing relations between the U.S. and Cuba and ending the FARC insurgency in Colombia.

=== Peace negotiations in Colombia ===
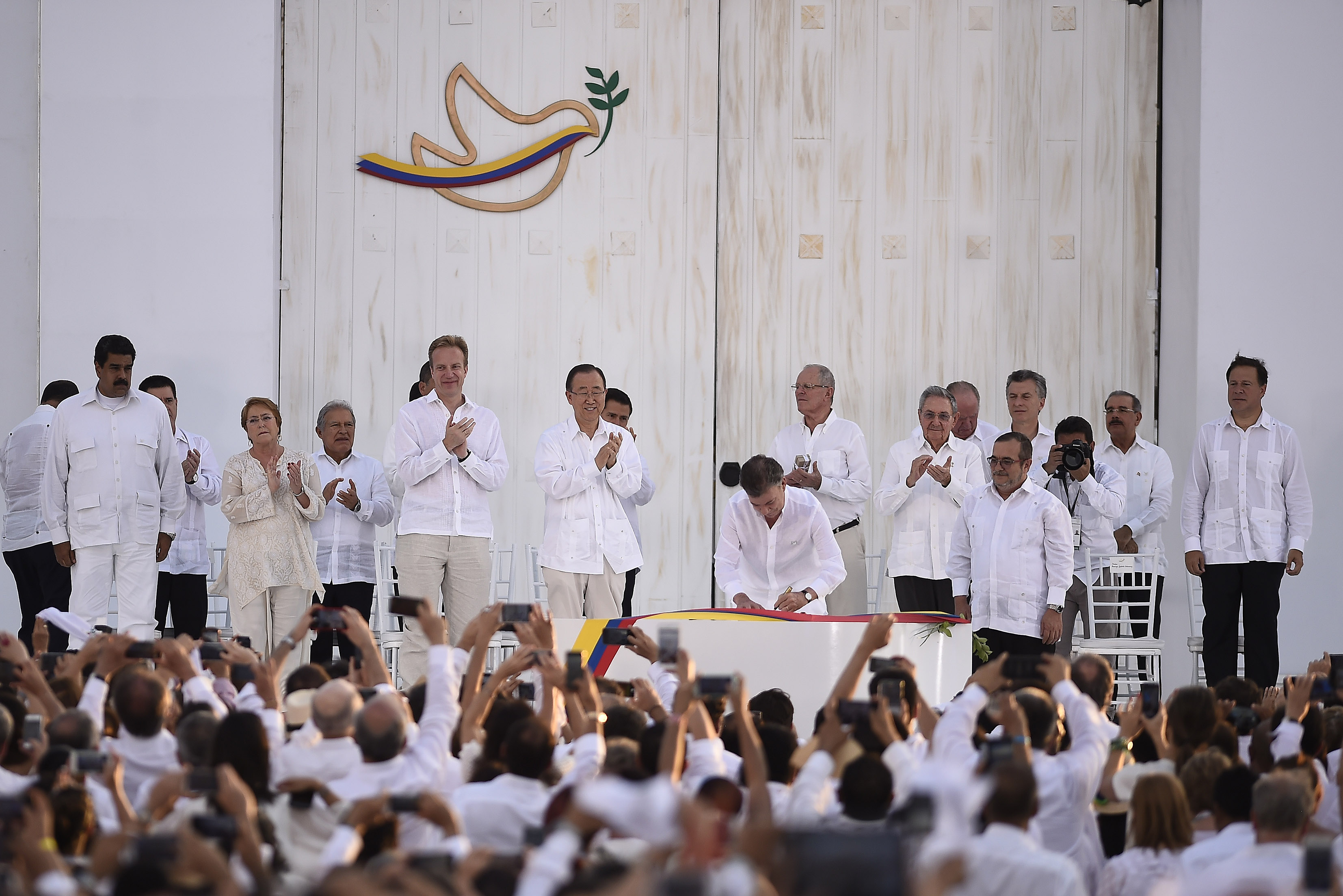
Columbian officials and FARC representatives sign the peace accord, 2016.

The Vatican, and the Entity in particular, is said to have played a key role in the Colombian peace process which led to the four-way operation between President Juan Manuel Santos, Raúl Castro, Pope Francis and FARC leader Rodrigo Londoño Echeverri. The Entity's agents, some activists in Latin America's "liberation movements," moved discreetly between the capitals of the involved nations - Havana, Washington, Rome and Bogotá - to endorse the peace negotiations. The Vatican reportedly leveraged its influence within the National Liberation Army (ELN), where a large portion of the leading cadres are followers of Father Camilo Torres Restrepo, a Catholic Communist revolutionary guerrilla leader killed in combat in Santander in 1966.

== List of directors of the Entity ==
Image	Name	Birth date	Death date
	Ludovico Ludovisi	22 or 27 October 1595	18 November 1632
	Lorenzo Magalotti	1 January 1584	19 September 1637
	Olimpia Maidalchini	26 May 1591	27 September 1657
	Sforza Pallavicino	28 November 1607	4 June 1667
	Paluzzo Paluzzi	8 June 1623	29 June 1698
	Bartolomeo Pacca	27 December 1756	19 April 1844
	Giovanni Battista Caprara	29 May 1733	21 June 1810
	Annibale Albani	15 August 1682	21 September 1751
	Pietro Fumasoni Biondi	4 September 1872	12 July 1960
	Luigi Poggi	25 November 1917	4 May 2010
	José Luis Uboldi	1955	Unknown

== See also ==
Throughout history the Entity has had competitors or offshoots, among them the Black Order and Sodalitium Pianum.

- The Black Order was a seventeenth century counterintelligence group created under the papacy of Innocent X (1644–1655) by Olimpia Maidalchini. The task of the institution was to neutralize the spies infiltrated in the Vatican, especially those in the pay of Cardinal Mazarin.
- Sodalitium Pianum was a network of counter-espionage, propaganda and disinformation organized by Monsignor Umberto Benigni since 1909. The institution was created to address the struggle against the dangers of modernism, especially within the Church. Sodalitium Pianum was formally dissolved in 1922 by Pope Benedict XV but understood to have continued into the early years of World War II.
