= Rino Passigato =

Italian prelate and Vatican diplomat

His Excellency, The Most Reverend Rino Passigato GCC GCSE
- Apostolic Nuncio
- Appointed: 8 November 2008 (Nuncio to Portugal)
- Retired: 4 July 2019
- Predecessor: Alfio Rapisarda
- Successor: Ivo Scapolo
- Other post: Titular Archbishop of Nova Caesaris
- Previous posts: Apostolic Pro-Nuncio of Burundi (1991-1996); Apostolic Nuncio of Bolivia (1996-1999); Apostolic Nuncio of Peru (1999-2008)

Orders
- Ordination: 29 June 1968
- Consecration: 6 January 1992 by Pope John Paul II, Giovanni Battista Re, and Josip Uhac

Personal details
- Born: March 29, 1944 (age 82) Bovolone, Italy

Styles of Rino Passigato
- Reference style: His Excellency; The Most Reverend
- Spoken style: Your Excellency
- Religious style: Archbishop

Rino Passigato (born 29 March 1944) is an Italian prelate of the Catholic Church, who was the Apostolic Nuncio to Portugal from 2008 to 2019. He joined the diplomatic service of the Holy See in 1973. He has been an archbishop since 1992 and served as an apostolic nuncio in Burundi, Bolivia, and Peru.

== Biography ==
Rino Passigato was born in Bovolone, Italy, on 29 March 1944. He was ordained a priest for the Diocese of Verona on 29 June 1968. He entered the Pontifical Ecclesiastical Academy, the Vatican school for diplomats, in 1969.

He entered the diplomatic service of the Holy See in 1973. His early assignments included postings in Cameroon, Australia, Egypt, Great Britain, (Note: While based in London, Passigato provided the Congregation for Bishops with information that discredited a critic of Opus Dei.) and the United States. In 1982 he earned a doctorate in canon law at the Pontifical Gregorian University with a dissertation titled "The regime of religious freedom and the relations between the political community and the Catholic Church in Vatican II".

On 16 December 1991, Pope John Paul II appointed titular archbishop of Nova Caesaris and Apostolic Pro-Nuncio to Burundi. He received his episcopal consecration on 6 January 1992 from Pope John Paul. In Burundi he witnessed the beginnings of genocidal violence between Hutus and Tutsis, and sheltered hundreds of refugees in the garden of the nunciature in Bujumbura.

On 18 March 1996, he was named Apostolic Nuncio to Bolivia.

On 17 July 1999, he was named Apostolic Nuncio to Peru.

On 8 November 2008, Pope Benedict XVI appointed him Apostolic Nuncio to Portugal. He presented his credentials to Aníbal Cavaco Silva, President of Portugal]], on 11 November.

In October 2017, the weekly newspaperExpresso published a lengthy attack on Passigato citing mostly anonymous priests and bishops accusing him of incompetence and lack of consideration for personal circumstances in episcopal appointments. He declined to comment.

Celebrating the fiftieth anniversary of his priestly ordination in July 2018, the Salesians of Portugal praised his:

...enlightened vision of the world and the intricate problems that power generates and confronts... wisdom more biblical and prophetic than diplomatic and worldly, that makes him a master of the spirit capable of traversing the opacity and contradictions of each moment with ... lucidity and humility.

Pope Francis accepted his resignation on 4 July 2019, a few months after he turned 75.

== Honours ==
- Grand Cross of the Order of Christ of the Portuguese Republic (11 March 2010).
- Grand Cross of the Order of Saint James of the Sword of the Portuguese Republic (6 June 2009).
- Medal of the Cross of Saint George (June 2019).

== Notes ==
Diplomatic posts
Preceded by Pietro Sambi	Apostolic Pro-Nuncio to Burundi; 16 December 1991 – 18 March 1996	Succeeded by Emil Paul Tscherrig
Preceded by Giovanni Tonucci	Apostolic Nuncio to Bolivia; 18 March 1996 – 17 July 1999	Succeeded by Józef Wesołowski
Preceded by Fortunato Baldelli	Apostolic Nuncio to Peru; 17 July 1999 – 8 November 2008	Succeeded by Bruno Musarò
Preceded by Alfio Rapisarda	Apostolic Nuncio to Portugal; 8 November 2008 – 4 July 2019	Succeeded by Ivo Scapolo
