= José Avelino Bettencourt =

Portuguese-Canadian Catholic archbishop

His Excellency, The Most Reverend José Avelino Bettencourt ComC, OMRI
- Apostolic Nuncio to Cameroon and Equatorial Guinea; Titular Archbishop of Aemona
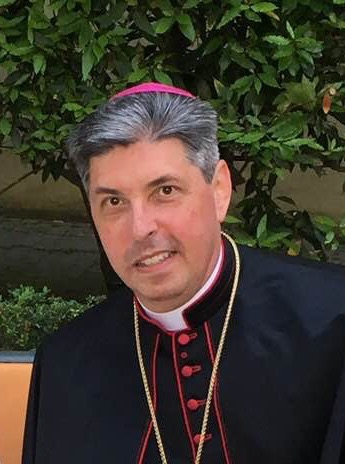
- Appointed: 26 February 2018
- Predecessor: Julio Murat
- Other post: Titular Archbishop of Aemona
- Previous posts: Apostolic Nuncio to Armenia and Georgia (2018-2023); Head of Protocol of Secretariat of State of the Holy See (2012-2018)

Orders
- Ordination: 29 May 1993 by Marcel André J. Gervais
- Consecration: 19 March 2018 by Pope Francis

Personal details
- Born: 23 May 1962 (age 64) Velas, Azores, Portugal
- Denomination: Roman Catholic
- Residence: Tbilisi
- Education: University of Ottawa, St. Paul University, Pontifical Gregorian University, Pontifical Ecclesiastical Academy
- Motto: FIDES SPES CHARITAS (Corinthians 13:13)
- Coat of arms

Styles of José Avelino Bettencourt
- Reference style: His Excellency; The Most Reverend
- Spoken style: Your Excellency
- Religious style: Archbishop

José Avelino Bettencourt ComC, OMRI (born 23 May 1962) is a Portuguese-Canadian prelate of the Catholic Church who works in the diplomatic service of the Holy See.

== Biography ==
Born in Velas, Azores, on 23 May 1962, he settled at a young age in Canada with his family. Bettencourt was ordained a priest in 1993 in the Archdiocese of Ottawa and graduated with degrees in literature and theology from the University of Ottawa.

== Diplomatic career ==
He entered the diplomatic service of the Holy See in 1999 and obtained a doctorate in canon law at Pontifical Gregorian University. He worked at the apostolic nunciature to the Democratic Republic of the Congo and then moved to the Secretariat of State of the Holy See.

On 14 November 2012, Pope Benedict XVI appointed him head of the protocol of the Secretariat of State. He was also responsible for contacts with the embassies accredited to the Holy See and to the central Vatican authority.

On 26 February 2018, Pope Francis gave him the title apostolic nuncio and appointed him Titular Archbishop of Aemona. He was named nuncio to Armenia on 1 March and to Georgia as well on 8 March. He received his episcopal ordination from Pope Francis on 19 March.

On 30 August 2023, Pope Francis appointed him as nuncio to Cameroon and Equatorial Guinea

== Honours and Arms ==
=== Honours ===
Commander of Order of Christ, Palácio Nacional de Belém, 29 April 2013

Grand Officer of Order of Merit of the Italian Republic, Rome, 18 April 2015

=== Coat of Arms ===
Bettencourt was granted coat of arms by the Canadian Heraldic Authority through a Grant of Arms, on 15 August 2019.

Coat of arms of José Avelino Bettencourt
Granted 2019 Escutcheon Gules on a chevron Argent three concentric stars of eight points Sable voided Argent between two lions passant Sable. Motto FIDES • SPES • CHARITAS (these Latin words meaning “Faith, hope, love” are taken from 1 Corinthians 13:13: “Now faith, hope and love abide; and the greatest of these is love.”) Symbolism The red symbolizes love, strength and faithful service. The chevron alludes to a carpenter’s square, the attribute of St. Joseph, Patron of the Universal Church, of Canada, and of the Archdiocese of Ottawa, as well as Archbishop Bettencourt’s namesake, José being Portuguese for Joseph. The Holy Trinity is represented by the three iterations of the star, Jesus Christ by its cross form, and the Blessed Virgin Mary by the star itself. The lions refer to Portuguese Bettencourt coats of arms, which feature a rampant black lion on white. The two of them indicate that Archbishop Bettencourt’s parents came from different branches of the Bettencourt family

== See also ==
- List of heads of the diplomatic missions of the Holy See

Diplomatic posts
Preceded by Fortunatus Nwachukwu	Head of Protocol of Secretariat of State of the Holy See; 14 November 2012 – 26 February 2018	Succeeded by Joseph Murphy
Preceded by Marek Solczyński	Apostolic Nuncio to Armenia; 1 March 2018 – 30 August 2023	Succeeded by vacant
Preceded by Marek Solczyński	Apostolic Nuncio to Georgia; 8 March 2018 – 30 August 2023	Succeeded by vacant
Preceded by Julio Murat	Apostolic Nuncio to Cameroon; 30 August 2023 – present	Incumbent
Preceded by Julio Murat	Apostolic Nuncio to Equatorial Guinea; 30 August 2023 – present	Incumbent
