= Sodalitium =

Sodalitium is Latin for fellowship or community and may refer to:

- Sodalitium Christianae Vitae
- Sodalitium Pianum
