= Jan Romeo Pawłowski =

Polish Catholic prelate

His Excellency, The Most Reverend Jan Romeo Pawłowski
- Apostolic Nuncio to Ireland; Titular Archbishop of Sejny
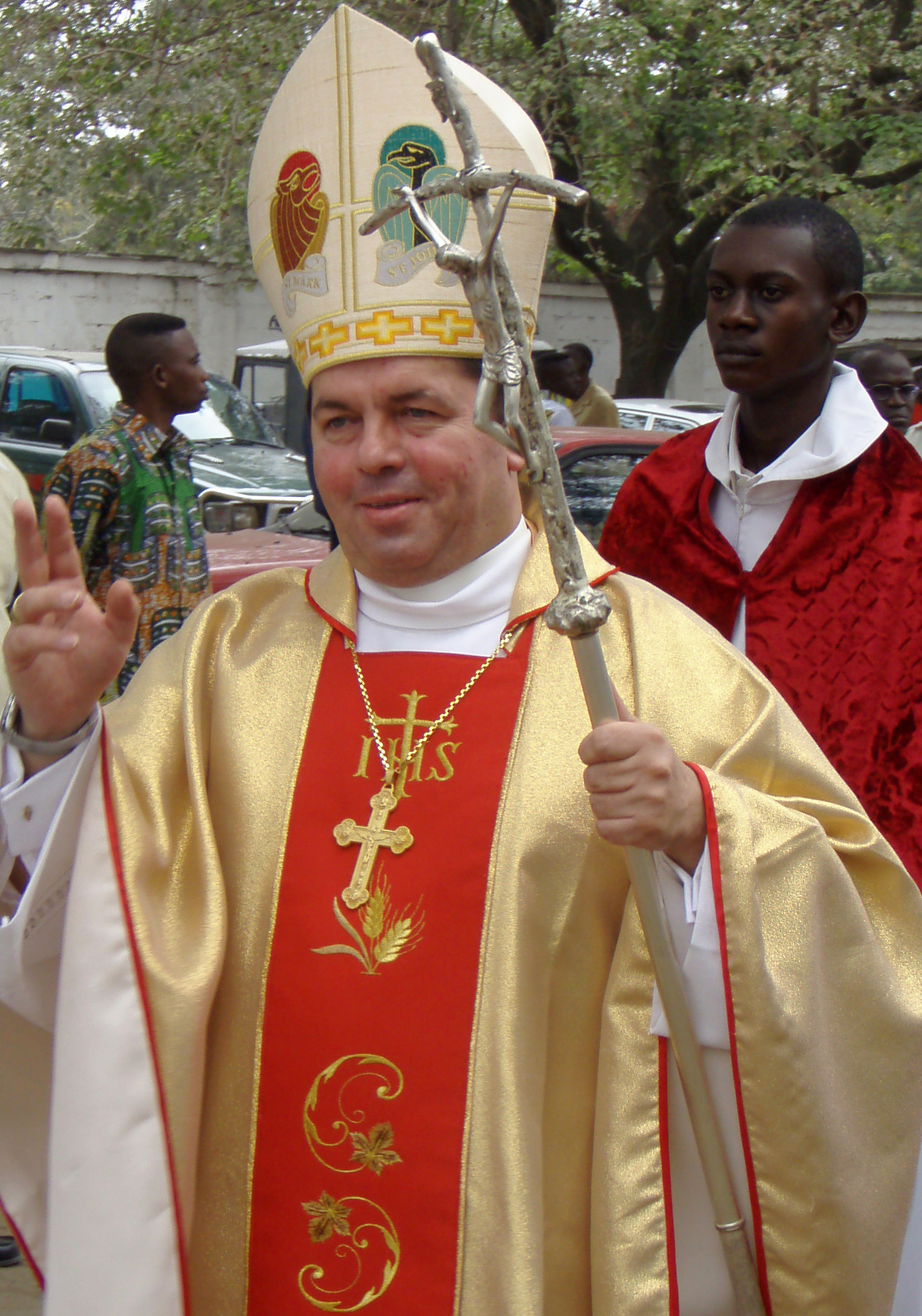
- Archbishop Pawłowski in Brazzaville in 2009.
- Church: Roman Catholic Church
- Appointed: 7 October 2026
- Predecessor: Luis Mariano Montemayor
- Other post: Titular Archbishop of Sejny
- Previous posts: Apostolic Nuncio to Greece (2022-2026); Delegate for Pontifical Representations of the Secretariat of State (2015-2022); Apostolic Nuncio to the Republic of Congo and Gabon (2009-15)

Orders
- Ordination: 1 June 1985 by Józef Glemp
- Consecration: 30 April 2009 by Tarcisio Bertone

Personal details
- Born: Jan Romeo Pawłowski; 23 November 1960 (age 65) Biskupiec, Poland
- Education: Pontifical Ecclesiastical Academy; Pontifical Gregorian University
- Motto: Oportet Christum crescere
- Coat of arms

Styles of Jan Romeo Pawłowski
- Reference style: His Excellency; The Most Reverend
- Spoken style: Your Excellency
- Religious style: Archbishop

Jan Romeo Pawłowski (born November 1960) is a Polish prelate of the Catholic Church who works in the diplomatic service of the Holy See.

== Biography ==
Pawlowski was born on 23 November 1960 Biskupiec, Poland, and became an ordained priest in June 1985, before becoming incardinated in 2004. In 1987–1991, he studied at the Pontifical University, obtaining a doctorate in canon law.

== Diplomatic career ==
Pawlowski later studied to join the Holy See's diplomatic service. On 18 March 2009 he was made an archbishop and named the Apostolic Nuncio to the Republic of Congo and Gabon.

On 7 December 2015, Pawlowski was appointed an official of the Secretariat of State. In 2017, Pope Francis named him the head of the newly created third section of that Secretariat, the Section for Diplomatic Staff.

On 1 December 2022, Pope Francis appointed him as nuncio to Greece.

On 7 October 2026, Pope Leo XIV appointed him as nuncio to Ireland

== Honours ==
- Portugal: Grand Cross of the Order of Merit (23 April 2016)

== See also ==
- List of heads of the diplomatic missions of the Holy See

Diplomatic posts
Preceded by Luis Mariano Montemayor	Apostolic Nuncio to Ireland; 2026-present	Succeeded by Incumbent
Preceded by Savio Hon Tai-Fai	Apostolic Nuncio to Greece; 2022-2026	Succeeded by Vacant
Preceded by	Delegate for Pontifical Representations of the Secretariat of State; 2015–2022	Succeeded by Luciano Russo
Preceded by Andrés Carrascosa Coso	Apostolic Nuncio to the Republic of Congo and Gabon; 2009–2015	Succeeded by Francisco Escalante Molina
