= Alfio Rapisarda =

Italian prelate of the Catholic Church (1933–2026)

His Excellency, The Most Reverend Alfio Rapisarda
- Apostolic Nuncio Emeritus of Portugal; Titular Archbishop of Cannae
- Appointed: 12 October 2002
- Retired: 8 November 2008
- Predecessor: Edoardo Rovida
- Successor: Rino Passigato
- Other post: Titular Archbishop of Cannae (1979–2026)
- Previous posts: Apostolic Nuncio of Brazil (1992–2002); Apostolic Pro-Nuncio of Zaire (1985–1992); Apostolic Nuncio of Bolivia (1979–1985)

Orders
- Ordination: 14 July 1957 by Guido Luigi Bentivoglio
- Consecration: 27 May 1979 by Pope John Paul II, Duraisamy Simon Lourdusamy, and Eduardo Martínez Somalo

Personal details
- Born: 3 September 1933 Zafferana Etnea, Catania, Italy
- Died: 11 February 2026 (aged 92) Aci Sant'Antonio, Catania, Italy
- Motto: Super Omnia Charitas

Styles of Alfio Rapisarda
- Reference style: His Excellency; The Most Reverend
- Spoken style: Your Excellency
- Religious style: Archbishop

Alfio Rapisarda (3 September 1933 – 11 February 2026) was an Italian prelate of the Catholic Church who worked in the diplomatic service of the Holy See from 1962 to 2008, with the title of apostolic nuncio from 1979.

== Early life ==
Alfio Rapisarda was born on 3 September 1933 in Zafferana Etnea, Province of Catania, Italy. He was ordained a priest on 14 July 1957. He earned a doctorate in canon law.

== Diplomatic career ==
Rapisarda entered the diplomatic service of the Holy See in 1962. He completed the course of studies at the Pontifical Ecclesiastical Academy in 1960. His early assignments included stints in Honduras, Brazil, France, Yugoslavia, and Lebanon.

On 22 April 1979, Pope John Paul II appointed him Titular Archbishop of Cannae and Apostolic Nuncio to Bolivia and consecrated him a bishop on 27 May.

On 29 January 1985, John Paul named him Apostolic Nuncio to Zaire (now the Democratic Republic of the Congo), Apostolic Nuncio to Brazil on 2 June 1992, and Apostolic Nuncio to Portugal on 12 October 2002. In 2004 Portugal and the Holy See signed a new concordat, replacing an outdated one from 1940.

Pope Benedict XVI accepted his resignation on 8 November 2008.

== Death ==
Rapisarda died in Aci Sant'Antonio on 11 February 2026, at the age of 92.

== See also ==
- Apostolic Nunciature
- Apostolic Nuncio
- Catholic Church in Africa
- List of diplomatic missions of the Holy See
- List of heads of the diplomatic missions of the Holy See
- Giovanni D'Aniello
- Pontifical Ecclesiastical Academy

Catholic Church titles
Preceded by Edoardo Rovida	Apostolic Nuncio to Portugal; 2002–2008	Succeeded by Rino Passigato
Preceded by Carlo Furno	Apostolic Nuncio to Brazil; 1992–2002	Succeeded by Lorenzo Baldisseri
Preceded by Josip Uhač	Apostolic Pro-Nuncio of Zaire; 1985–1992	Succeeded by Faustino Sainz Muñoz
Preceded by Giuseppe Laigueglia	Apostolic Nuncio to Bolivia; 1979–1985	Succeeded by Santos Abril y Castelló
Preceded by Joseph Marie Louis Duval	Titular Archbishop of Cannae; 1979–2026	Succeeded by Vacant
