= Edoardo Rovida =

Italian Roman Catholic prelate (1927–2026)

His Excellency, The Most Reverend Edoardo Rovida
- Apostolic Nuncio emeritus of Portugal; Titular Archbishop of Tauromenium
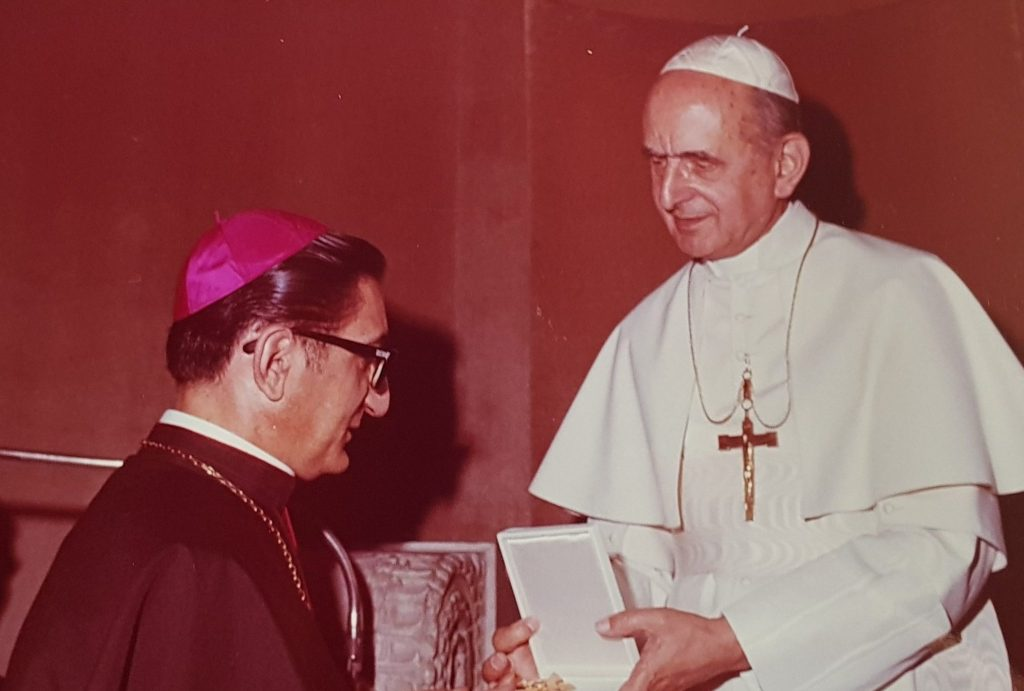
- Rovida and Pope Paul VI in 1975
- Appointed: 15 March 1993
- Retired: 12 October 2002
- Predecessor: Luciano Angeloni
- Successor: Alfio Rapisarda
- Other post: Titular Archbishop of Tauromenium (1971–2026)
- Previous posts: Apostolic nuncio to Portugal (1993–2002); Apostolic nuncio to Liechtenstein (1987–1993); Apostolic nuncio to Switzerland (1985–1993); Permanent Observer of the Holy See to the United Nations in Geneva (1981–1985); Apostolic pro-nuncio to the Zaire (1977–1981); Apostolic nuncio to Panama (1971–1977)

Orders
- Ordination: 29 June 1950 by Giuseppe Pietro Gagnor
- Consecration: 10 October 1971 by Jean-Marie Villot, Giovanni Benelli and Giuseppe Almici

Personal details
- Born: 26 August 1927 Alessandria, Italy
- Died: 26 May 2026 (aged 98) Asti, Italy
- Motto: Veniet auxilium mihi

Styles of Edoardo Rovida
- Reference style: His Excellency; The Most Reverend
- Spoken style: Your Excellency
- Religious style: Archbishop

Edoardo Rovida (26 August 1927 – 26 May 2026) was an Italian prelate of the Catholic Church who worked in the diplomatic service of the Holy See from 1953 to 2002.

== Early years and priesthood ==
Edoardo Rovida was born on 26 August 1927 in Alessandria, Italy, and was ordained a priest on 29 June 1950.

== Diplomatic career ==
Rovida completed the course of studies at the Pontifical Ecclesiastical Academy in 1953.

He became known as a beneficiary of the patronage of Giovanni Benelli, who as substitute of the Secretariat of State, dominated the department from 1967 to 1977. His early assignments in the diplomatic service of the Holy See included a stint in Cuba during the early years of the Cuban Revolution. (Note: His role as secretary of the nunciature in Havana is documented in 1958 and 1960.)

On 31 July 1971, Pope Paul VI appointed Rovida as titular archbishop of Tauromenium and apostolic nuncio to Panama. He received his episcopal consecration on 10 October from Cardinal Jean-Marie Villot, the Secretary of State.

On 13 August 1977, Rovida was appointed Apostolic Pro-Nuncio to Zaire and on 7 March 1981 was named Permanent Observer of the Holy See to the United Nations in Geneva.

On 26 January 1985, Rovida was appointed Apostolic Nuncio to Switzerland and on 7 March 1987 Apostolic Nuncio to Liechtenstein.

On 15 March 1993, Rovida was appointed apostolic nuncio to Portugal.

Rovida's service as nuncio to Portugal ended with the appointment of his successor, Alfio Rapisarda, on 12 October 2002, but maintained the title nuncio.

== Death ==
Rovida died in Asti on 26 May 2026, at the age of 98.

== See also ==
- List of heads of the diplomatic missions of the Holy See

== Notes ==
Catholic Church titles
Preceded by Luciano Angeloni	Apostolic Nuncio to Portugal; 1993–2002	Succeeded by Alfio Rapisarda
Preceded by Position established	Apostolic Nuncio to Liechtenstein; 1987–1993	Succeeded by Karl-Josef Rauber
Preceded by Ambrogio Marchioni	Apostolic Nuncio to Switzerland; 1985–1993	Succeeded by Karl-Josef Rauber
Preceded by Jean Rupp	Permanent Observer of the Holy See to the United Nations in Geneva; 1981–1985	Succeeded by Justo Mullor García
Preceded by Lorenzo Antonetti	Apostolic Pro-Nuncio to Zaire; 1977–1981	Succeeded by Josip Uhač
Preceded by Antonino Pinci	Apostolic Nuncio to Panama; 1971–1977	Succeeded by Blasco Francisco Collaço
Preceded by Robert Emmet Lucey	Titular Bishop of Tauromenium; 1971–2026	Succeeded by Vacant
