= Apostolic Nunciature to the Republic of the Congo =

Diplomatic post of the Holy See

The Apostolic Nunciature to the Republic of the Congo is an ecclesiastical office of the Catholic Church in the Republic of the Congo. It is a diplomatic post of the Holy See, whose representative is called the Apostolic Nuncio with the rank of an ambassador. Its offices are in Brazzaville, the capital city.

The Holy See established its Delegation to the Republic of the Congo in 1970. It raised it to the rank of Nunciature in 1978.

== List of papal representatives to the Republic of the Congo ==
Apostolic Delegates

- Mario Tagliaferri (5 March 1970 - 25 June 1975)
- Oriano Quilici (15 November 1975 - 26 June 1981)

Apostolic Nuncios

- John Bulaitis (21 November 1981 - 11 July 1987)
- Beniamino Stella (21 August 1987 - 15 December 1992)
- Diego Causero (1 February 1993 - 1995)
- Luigi Pezzuto (7 December 1996 - 22 May 1999)
- Mario Roberto Cassari (3 August 1999 - 31 July 2004)
- Andrés Carrascosa Coso (31 July 2004 - 12 January 2009)
- Jan Romeo Pawłowski (18 March 2009 - 7 December 2015)
- Francisco Escalante Molina (19 March 2016 – 4 June 2021)
- Javier Herrera Corona (5 February 2022 – 22 November 2025)
- Relwendé Kisito Ouédraogo (28 January 2026 – present)
