= Eliseo Antonio Ariotti =

Italian prelate of the Catholic Church

His Excellency, The Most Reverend Eliseo Antonio Ariotti
- Apostolic Nuncio Emeritus to Paraguay; Titular Archbishop of Vibiana
- Installed: 5 November 2009
- Retired: 29 December 2023
- Predecessor: Orlando Antonini
- Successor: Vincenzo Turturro
- Other post: Titular Archbishop of Vibiana
- Previous post: Apostolic Nuncio to Cameroon and Equatorial Guinea (2008-2009)

Orders
- Ordination: 7 May 1975 by Giuseppe Amari
- Consecration: 5 October 2003 by Angelo Sodano

Personal details
- Born: 17 November 1948 (age 77) Vailate, Italy
- Motto: Misericordia et pax (Mercy and peace)
- Coat of arms

Styles of Full Name
- Reference style: His Excellency; The Most Reverend
- Spoken style: Your Excellency
- Religious style: Archbishop

Eliseo Antonio Ariotti (born 17 November 1948) is an Italian prelate of the Catholic Church who works in the diplomatic service of the Holy See. He was Apostolic Nuncio to Paraguay from 2009 until December 2023.

== Biography ==
Eliseo Antonio Ariotti was born on 17 November 1948 in Vailate, Province of Cremona, Italy. He was ordained a priest of the Diocese of Cremona on 7 May 1975.

== Diplomatic career ==
He entered the Vatican’s diplomatic service on 10 May 1984 and served in Uganda, Syria, Malta, the United States, and in Rome in the offices of the Secretariat of State, followed by an assignment in Spain and three years in France.

On 17 July 2003, Pope John Paul II appointed him Titular Archbishop of Vibiana and Apostolic Nuncio to Cameroon. On 5 August 2003, John Paul named him Apostolic Nuncio to Equatorial Guinea as well. He received his episcopal consecration from Cardinal Angelo Sodano on 5 October on the Cathedral of Cremona.

On 5 November 2009, Pope Benedict XVI appointed him Apostolic Nuncio to Paraguay.

On 29 December 2023, Pope Francis accepted his resignation after reaching the retirement age of 75.

== See also ==
- List of heads of the diplomatic missions of the Holy See
