= Joseph Murphy (priest) =

Joseph Murphy (born 16 August 1968) has served as under-secretary of the Section for Diplomatic Staff since September 2023. Previously he was Head of Protocol at the Holy See's Secretariat of State.

== Biography ==
Murphy was born in Donoughmore, Cork, Ireland. He was ordained a priest on 11 July 1993 for the Diocese of Cloyne.

He studied at the Pontifical Irish College and Pontifical French Seminary, and the Pontifical Gregorian University in Rome, where he earned his doctorate in Sacred Theology.

He began his service in the service of the Holy See's Section for General Affairs on 1 October 1997. In 2002 he was appointed private secretary to Cardinal Angelo Sodano, then Vatican secretary of state.

He was transferred to the Section for Relations with States on 15 September 2006.

On 22 March 2018 he was appointed Head of Protocol at the Secretariat of State replacing José Avelino Bettencourt.

As Head of Protocol Murphy addresses the procedures concerning the granting of the agrément for new Ambassadors, their reception when they arrive in Rome, their first protocol visits to the Substitute for General Affairs for the presentation of copies of their credential letters and to the Secretary for Relations with States, the official communication of the solemn Audience for the presentation of credential letters to the Pope and all the formalities relating to diplomatic personnel accredited to the Holy. It also deals with official requests for audiences with the Pope and the sending of temporary Pontifical Missions and envoys.

In September 2023 he was appointed under-secretary of the Section for Diplomatic Staff.

Diplomatic posts
Preceded by José Avelino Bettencourt	Head of Protocol of Secretariat of State of the Holy See; 22 March 2018 – 14 September 2023	Succeeded by Javier Domingo Fernández González
Preceded by Mauricio Rueda Beltz	Undersecretary for Diplomatic Personnel; 14 September 2023 – present	Succeeded by incumbent
