= San Ponziano, Rome =

San Ponziano
- Church of Saint Pontian
- San Ponziano a Monte Sacro
- Chiesa di San Ponziano di Roma
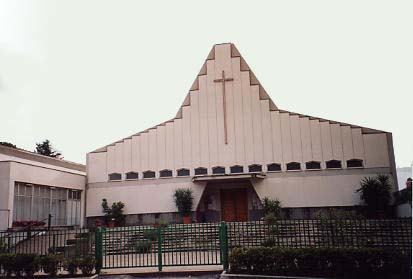

- Location within Rome
- 41°56′51″N 12°32′41″E
- Location: Via Nicola Festa 50, Monte Sacro Alto, Rome
- Country: Italy
- Language: Italian
- Denomination: Catholic
- Tradition: Roman Rite
- Website: sanponziano.net

History
- Status: titular church
- Dedication: Pope Pontian
- Consecrated: 1974

Architecture
- Functional status: active
- Architect: Giuseppe Russo Rocca
- Architectural type: Modern
- Groundbreaking: 1970
- Completed: 1974

Administration
- Diocese: Rome

San Ponziano [sam ponˈtsjaːno] is a 20th-century parochial church and titular church in the northern suburbs of Rome, dedicated to Pope Pontian (d. AD 235).

== History ==
San Ponziano was built in 1970–74. Pope John Paul II visited in 1982.

On 24 November 2007, it was made a titular church to be held by a cardinal-deacon.

Cardinal-Protectors

- Urbano Navarrete Cortés (2007–2010)
- Santos Abril y Castelló (2012–present)
