= Apostolic Nunciature to Cameroon =

Diplomatic mission of the Holy See in Cameroon

- Location: Yaoundé, Cameroun.
- Address: Rue du Vatican, B.P. 210, Yaoundé, Cameroun.
- Coordinates: 3°54′52.9″N 11°29′35.3″E
- Apostolic Nuncio: Archbishop Julio Murat

The Apostolic Nunciature to Cameroon the diplomatic mission of the Holy See to Cameroon. It is located in Yaoundé. The current Apostolic Nuncio is Archbishop Julio Murat, who was named to the position by Pope Francis on 24 March 2018.

The Apostolic Nunciature to the Republic of Cameroon is an ecclesiastical office of the Catholic Church in Cameroon, with the rank of an embassy. The nuncio serves both as the ambassador of the Holy See to the President of Cameroon, and as delegate and point-of-contact between the Catholic hierarchy in Cameroon and the Pope.

The Apostolic Nuncio to Cameroon is usually also the Apostolic Nuncio to Equatorial Guinea upon his appointment to said nation.

== List of papal representatives ==
Apostolic Pro-Nuncios

- Luigi Poggi (31 October 1966 – 21 May 1969)

Apostolic Nuncios

- Ernesto Gallina (16 July 1969 - 13 March 1971)
- Jean Jadot (15 May 1971 - 23 May 1973)
- Luciano Storero (30 June 1973 - 14 July 1976)
- Giuseppe Uhac (7 October 1976 - 3 June 1981)
- Donato Squicciarini (16 September 1981 - 1 July 1989)
- Santos Abril y Castelló (2 October 1989 - 24 February 1996)
- Félix del Blanco Prieto (5 May 1996 - 5 June 2003)
- Eliseo Antonio Ariotti (17 July 2003 - 5 November 2009)
- Piero Pioppo (25 January 2010 - 8 September 2017)
- Julio Murat (24 March 2018 - 9 Noverber 2022)
- José Avelino Bettencourt (30 August 2023 - present)
