= Apostolic Nunciature to Equatorial Guinea =

Diplomatic post of the Holy See

The Apostolic Nunciature to Equatorial Guinea is an ecclesiastical office of the Catholic Church. It is a diplomatic post of the Holy See, whose representative is called the Apostolic Delegate.The title Apostolic Nuncio to Equatorial Guinea is held by the prelate appointed Apostolic Nuncio to Cameroon; he resides in Yaounde.

Pope Paul VI established the Apostolic Delegation to Equatorial Guinea in 1971 and Pope John Paul II created the Apostolic Nunciature to Equatorial Guinea on 28 December 1981.

== Papal representatives to Equatorial Guinea ==
Apostolic Delegates

- Jean Jadot (15 May 1971 - 23 May 1973)
- Luciano Storero (30 June 1973 - 14 July 1976)
- Giuseppe Uhac (7 October 1976 - 3 June 1981)

Apostolic Pro-Nuncios

- Donato Squicciarini (16 September 1981 - 1 July 1989)
- Santos Abril y Castelló (2 October 1989 - 24 February 1996)

Apostolic Nuncios

- Félix del Blanco Prieto (28 June 1996 - 5 June 2003)
- Eliseo Antonio Ariotti (5 August 2003 - 5 November 2009)
- Piero Pioppo (25 January 2010 - 8 September 2017)
- Julio Murat (29 March 2018 - 9 November 2022)
- José Avelino Bettencourt (30 August 2023 - present)
