= Camarena de la Sierra =

- municipality
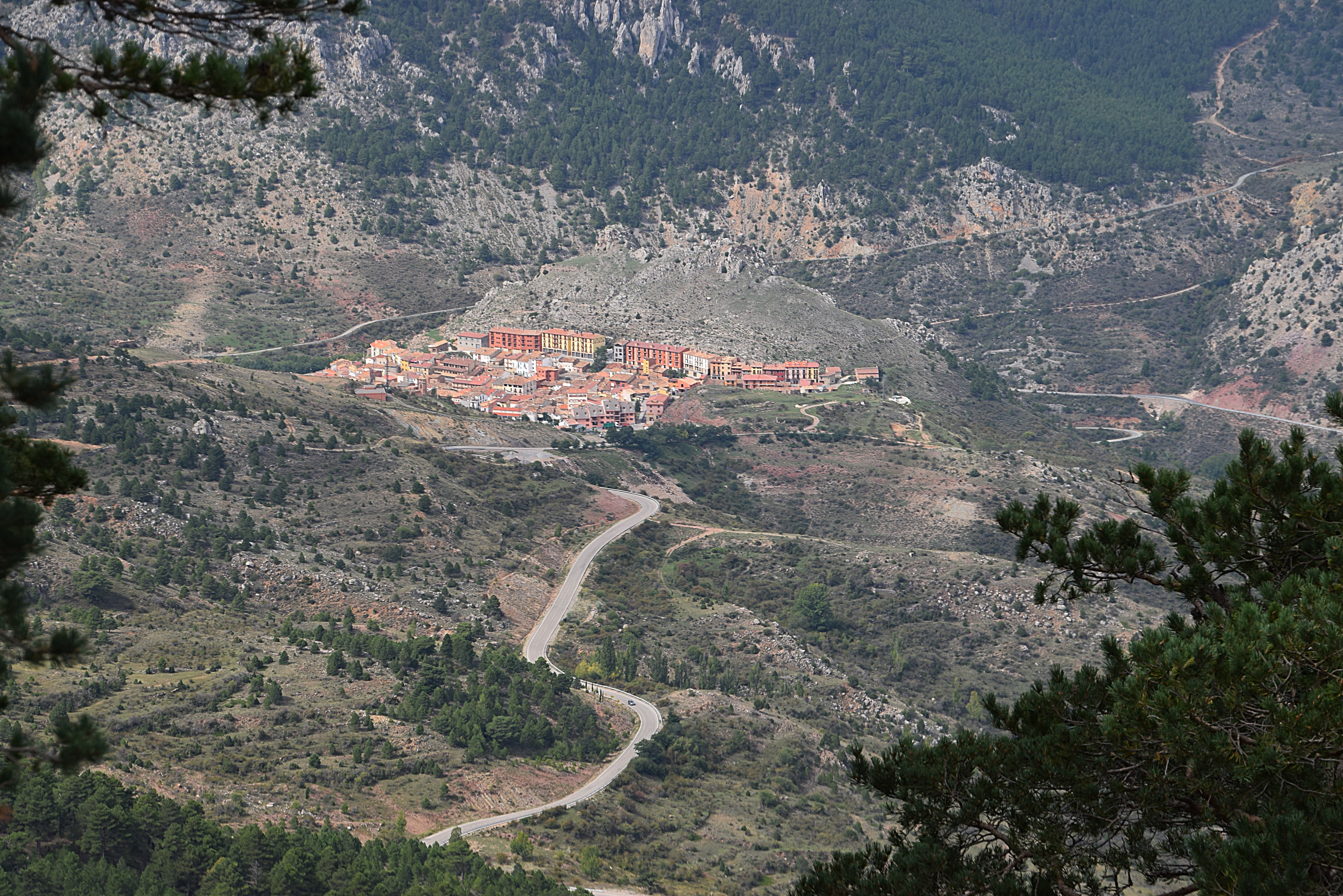

- Location within Spain
- Coordinates: 40°9′N 1°2′W
- Country: Spain
- Autonomous community: Aragon
- Province: Teruel

Area
  - Total: 79.54 km^{2} (30.71 sq mi)
- Elevation: 1,294 m (4,245 ft)

Population (2025-01-01)
  - Total: 137
  - Density: 1.72/km^{2} (4.46/sq mi)
- Time zone: UTC+1 (CET)
  - Summer (DST): UTC+2 (CEST)

Camarena de la Sierra is a municipality located in the province of Teruel, Aragon, Spain. According to the 2004 census (INE), the municipality had a population of 166 inhabitants.

This town is located at the feet of the Sierra de Javalambre, Sistema Ibérico.

It is the birthplace of Cardinal Urbano Navarrete Cortés, S.J.

== See also ==
- List of municipalities in Teruel
