= Relwendé Kisito Ouédraogo =

Burkinabé prelate of the Catholic Church

His Excellency, The Most Reverend Relwendé Kisito Ouédraogo
- Apostolic Nuncio to the Republic of the Congo and Gabon; Titular Archbishop of Hilta
- Appointed: 28 January 2026
- Predecessor: Javier Herrera Corona
- Other post: Titular Archbishop of Hilta

Orders
- Ordination: 13 December 2000
- Consecration: 7 March 2026 by Pietro Parolin, Philippe Ouédraogo and Justin Kientega

Personal details
- Born: 9 April 1972 (age 54) Gourcy, Burkina Faso
- Motto: Quodcumque Dixerit Vobis Facite (Do whatever he tells you)

Styles of Relwendé Kisito Ouédraogo
- Reference style: His Excellency; The Most Reverend
- Spoken style: Your Excellency
- Religious style: Archbishop

Relwendé Kisito Ouédraogo (born 9 April 1972) is a Burkinabé prelate of the Catholic Church who works in the diplomatic service of the Holy See.

== Biography ==
Relwendé Kisito Ouédraogo was born in Gourcy, Burkina Faso. He was ordained a priest for the Diocese of Ouahigouya on 13 December 2000.

== Diplomatic career ==
On 11 January 2010, he began his service for the Holy See working as an official in the Section for General Affairs of the Secretariat of State.

From 2013 until his appointment as Apostolic Nuncio, he served as the private secretary to Cardinal Parolin, Secretary of State.

On 28 January 2026, Pope Leo XIV appointed him Titular Archbishop of Hilta and Apostolic Nuncio to the Republic of the Congo. He was consecrated as an archbishop on 7 March 2026.

On 10 February 2026, he was assigned the additional responsibilities for Gabon.

== See also ==
- List of heads of the diplomatic missions of the Holy See
