= Luigi Poggi =

Italian Catholic prelate and spymaster (1917–2010)

His Eminence Luigi Poggi
- Cardinal; Archivist of the Vatican Secret Archive
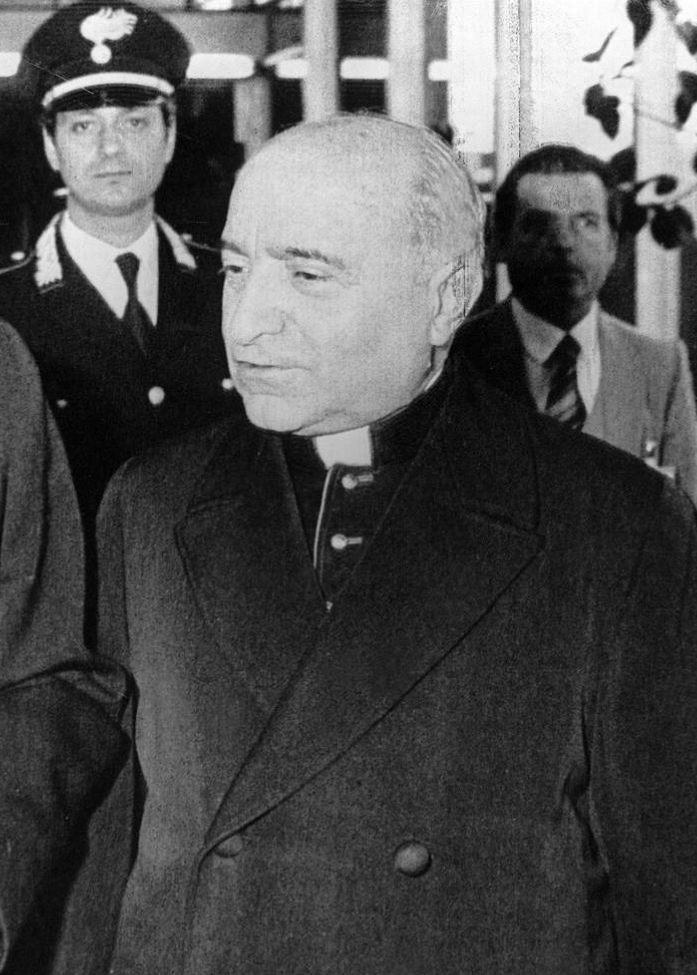
- Poggi in Rome, 1981
- Church: Catholic
- Appointed: 29 November 1994
- Term ended: 7 March 1998
- Predecessor: Antonio María Javierre Ortas
- Successor: Jorge María Mejía
- Other post: Cardinal-Priest of San Lorenzo in Lucina (2005‍–‍2010)
- Previous posts: Apostolic Delegate to Central Africa (1965‍–‍1969); Titular Archbishop of Forontoniana (1965‍–‍1994); Apostolic Pro-Nuncio to Cameroon (1966‍–‍1969); Apostolic Pro-Nuncio to Gabon (1967‍–‍1969); Apostolic Pro-Nuncio to the Central African Republic (1967‍–‍1969); Apostolic Nuncio to Peru (1969‍–‍1973); Delegation Chief to Poland (1975‍–‍1986); Apostolic Nuncio to Italy (1986‍–‍1992); Librarian of the Vatican Apostolic Library (1992‍–‍1994); Archivist Emeritus of the Vatican Secret Archive (1994‍–‍2010); Cardinal-Deacon of Santa Maria in Domnica (1994‍–‍2005); Cardinal Protodeacon (2002‍–‍2005)

Orders
- Ordination: 28 July 1940
- Consecration: 9 May 1965 by Amleto Giovanni Cicognani
- Created cardinal: 26 November 1994 by Pope John Paul II
- Rank: Cardinal-deacon (1994‍–‍2005); Cardinal-priest (2005‍–‍2010)

Personal details
- Born: Luigi Poggi; 25 November 1917 Piacenza, Kingdom of Italy
- Died: 4 May 2010 (aged 92) Rome
- Buried: Basilica di Sant'Antonino, Piacenza, Italy
- Education: Collegio Alberoni; Pontifical Ecclesiastical Academy
- Motto: In fide et caritate (Latin for 'In faith and love')
- Coat of arms

Luigi Poggi (25 November 1917 – 4 May 2010) was an Italian Catholic prelate, nuncio, and spymaster who led The Entity, the foreign intelligence service of the Holy See.

Made titular bishop of Forontoniana in 1965 upon assignment as nuncio, Poggi officially served as papal representative to several African nations before being reassigned to Europe to advance Paul VI's Ostpolitik policy of rapprochement to the Eastern Bloc. At the height of the Cold War he served as the Vatican's principal emissary to several Warsaw Pact countries, as Popes Paul VI and John Paul II sought renewed engagement with the Soviet Union. Named chief of the apostolic delegation to Poland during the 1980s, he led a partnership with the U.S. Central Intelligence Agency to back the Solidarity movement which eventually led to the end of Communist rule in the country. Poggi was elevated to cardinal in 1994 and ended his career in Rome, as nuncio to Italy and finally as head of the Vatican Library and Secret Archive.

== Early life ==
Born in Piacenza, Poggi studied at Collegio Alberoni prior to priestly ordination in that city. He entered the Pontifical Ecclesiastical Academy in 1944 to begin a career in the diplomatic service of the Holy See. Poggi then joined the Secretariat of State. Poggi headed a mission to investigate the legal status of titular churches in Tunisia in 1963 and 1964.

== Papal nuncio ==
On 3 April 1965, Pope Paul VI named him a titular archbishop and Apostolic Delegate to Central Africa, the region that later became the modern states of Cameroon, Chad, Congo-Brazzaville, Gabon, and the Central African Republic. He received his episcopal consecration from Cardinal Amleto Cicognani on 9 May 1965. As the Vatican established relationships with governments in the region, he was given additional titles: Apostolic Pro-Nuncio to Cameroon on 31 October 1966 Apostolic Pro-Nuncio to Gabon on 31 October 1967, and Apostolic Pro-Nuncio to the Central African Republic on 4 November 1967.

On 21 May 1969, he was named Apostolic Nuncio to Peru.

=== Ostpolitik ===
Pope Paul VI used Poggi in his "Ostpolitik", which aimed to improve Vatican relations with the Communist-ruled nations of the Warsaw Pact. On 1 August 1973, Pope Paul assigned him a special role as a nuncio responsible for improving relations with Poland, Hungary, Czechoslovakia, Rumania and Bulgaria. Early in the pontificate of Pope John Paul II, Poggi, an expert in Polish politics, was sent first to Warsaw and then to Moscow. He later visited Prague.

On 7 February 1975, Pope Paul named him to lead a special delegation to Poland.

== Director of The Entity ==
Poggi served as director of The Entity (Italian: L’Entità), the foreign intelligence service of the Holy See.

== Later years and death ==
Poggi's final assignment in the diplomatic service was as Apostolic Nuncio to Italy on 19 April 1986.

In 1992, Poggi became Archivist and Librarian of the Holy Roman Church, positions he resigned as required when he turned eighty.

He was made Cardinal-Deacon of Santa Maria in Domnica on 26 November 1994. On 26 February 2002, he became Cardinal Protodeacon, the most senior cardinal of the rank deacon, a role with ceremonial duties during a papal conclave and inauguration. After ten years as a cardinal deacon, he took the option to be elevated to Cardinal-Priest of San Lorenzo in Lucina on 24 February 2005, just weeks before the death of Pope John Paul.

Poggi died in Rome on 4 May 2010. His funeral was presided over by Dean of the College of Cardinals Angelo Sodano, with a homily by Pope Benedict XVI, whose letter to Poggi's surviving family spoke of the prelate's "many years of solicitous collaboration with the Holy See."

Catholic Church titles
Preceded by Romolo Carboni	Apostolic Nuncio to Italy and San Marino; 19 April 1986 – 9 April 1992	Succeeded by Carlo Furno
Preceded by Antonio María Javierre Ortas	Librarian of the Holy Roman Church; 9 April 1992 – 7 March 1998	Succeeded by Jorge María Mejía
Preceded by Antonio María Javierre Ortas	Archivist of the Holy Roman Church; 9 April 1992 – 7 March 1998	Succeeded by Jorge María Mejía
Preceded by Pio Laghi	Cardinal Protodeacon; 26 February 2002 – 24 February 2005	Succeeded by Jorge Medina Estévez
