= Luciano Storero =

Italian prelate

- Apostolic Nuncio to Ireland
- Church: Catholic Church
- In office: 15 November 1995 – 1 October 2000
- Predecessor: Emanuele Gerada
- Successor: Giuseppe Lazzarotto
- Other post: Titular Archbishop of Tigimma (1969-2000)
- Previous posts: Apostolic Pro-Nuncio to Greece (1990-1995); Apostolic Nuncio to Venezuela (1981-1990); Apostolic Pro-Nuncio to India (1976-1981); Apostolic Delegate to Equatorial Guinea (1973-1976); Apostolic Pro-Nuncio to Cameroon & Gabon (1973-1976); Apostolic Delegate to Puerto Rico (1970-1973); Apostolic Nuncio to the Dominican Republic (1970-1973); Apostolic Delegate to Ceylon (1969-1970)

Orders
- Ordination: 29 June 1949
- Consecration: 1 February 1970 by Jean-Marie Villot

Personal details
- Born: 26 September 1926 Pinasca, Province of Turin, Kingdom of Italy
- Died: 1 October 2000 (aged 74) Dublin, Republic of Ireland

Styles of Luciano Storero
- Reference style: The Most Reverend
- Spoken style: Your Excellency
- Religious style: Monsignor

Luciano Storero (26 September 1926 – 1 October 2000) was an Italian prelate of the Catholic Church who worked in the diplomatic service of the Holy See.

== Biography ==
Luciano Storero was born in Pinasca, Italy, on 26 September 1926. He was ordained a priest on 29 June 1949.

To prepare for a diplomatic career he entered the Pontifical Ecclesiastical Academy in 1951. He joined the diplomatic service in 1953 and his early assignments took him to Egypt, Japan, and Ireland.

On 25 November 1969, Pope Paul VI appointed him Titular Archbishop of Tigimma and Apostolic Delegate to Ceylon. He received his episcopal consecration on 1 February 1970 from Cardinal Jean-Marie Villot.

On 24 December 1970, Storero was appointed Apostolic Nuncio to the Dominican Republic. (Note: The Nuncio to the Dominican Republic is also responsible for Puerto Rico.)

He was named Pro-Nuncio to Gabon and to Cameroon and Apostolic Delegate to Equatorial Guinea on 30 June 1973.

He was appointed Apostolic Pro-Nuncio to India on 14 July 1976.

He was named Apostolic Nuncio to Venezuela on 2 February 1981.

Pope John Paul II appointed him Apostolic Pro-Nuncio to Greece on 28 June 1990.

On 15 November 1995, he was appointed the tenth Apostolic Nuncio to Ireland. After the Irish bishops devised a mandatory reporting policy in 1996 that bishops could adopt for use in their diocese, Storero warned them in 1997 that Vatican's Congregation for the Clergy opposed implementing a policy that included mandatory reporting to civil authorities. (Note: Vatican norms for cases of clergy accused of sexual abuse were overhauled in 2001 and became the responsibility of the Congregation for the Doctrine of the Faith.) In 1999, he was sued in civil court along with Brendan Comiskey, Bishop of Ferns, by a man who said he had been sexually abused by a priest and that the nunciature had taken no action when informed in the mid-1980s.

After fighting cancer for years, Storero arranged to retire before turning 75. He was planning his return to his native village when he died in a Dublin hospital on 1 October 2000 while still in his post.

== Notes ==
Diplomatic posts
Preceded by John Gordon	Apostolic Pro-Nuncio to India; 1976–1981	Succeeded by Agostino Cacciavillan
