= Francisco Escalante Molina =

Venezuelan archbishop and diplomat

His Excellency, The Most Reverend Francisco Escalante Molina
- Apostolic Nuncio of Japan; Titular Archbishop of Gratiana
- Appointed: 25 January 2024
- Predecessor: Leo Boccardi
- Other post: Titular Archbishop of Gratiana
- Previous posts: Apostolic Nuncio to Haiti (2021-2024); Apostolic Nuncio to Republic of Congo and Gabon (2016-2021)

Orders
- Ordination: 26 August 1989
- Consecration: 28 May 2016 by Aldo Giordano, Mario del Valle Moronta Rodríguez and José Trinidad Fernández Angulo

Personal details
- Born: January 29, 1965 (age 61) La Grita, Venezuela
- Motto: Maior Autem Caritas

Styles of Francisco Escalante Molina
- Reference style: His Excellency; The Most Reverend
- Spoken style: Your Excellency
- Religious style: Archbishop

Francisco Escalante Molina (born 29 January 1965) is a Venezuelan archbishop and diplomat of the Holy See.

== Biography ==
Born in La Grita, Venezuela, on 29 January 1965, Molina was ordained a priest on 26 August 1989.

== Diplomatic career ==
He joined the diplomatic service of the Holy See on 13 June 1998. His early assignments included stints in Sudan, Ghana, Malta, Nicaragua, Japan and Slovenia.

On 19 March 2016, he was appointed an archbishop and named apostolic nuncio to the Republic of the Congo. He was given additional responsibilities as apostolic nuncio to Gabon on 21 May.

On 4 June 2021, Pope Francis named him Apostolic Nuncio to Haiti.

On 25 January 2024, Pope Francis named him Apostolic Nuncio to Japan.

== See also ==
- List of heads of the diplomatic missions of the Holy See

Diplomatic posts
Preceded by Leo Boccardi	Apostolic Nuncio to Japan; 2024–present	Succeeded by Incumbent
Preceded by Eugene Nugent	Apostolic Nuncio to Haiti; 2021–2024	Succeeded by Vacant
Preceded by Jan Romeo Pawlowski	Apostolic Nuncio to the Republic of the Congo; 2016–2021	Succeeded by Javier Herrera Corona
Preceded by Jan Romeo Pawlowski	Apostolic Nuncio to Gabon; 2016–2021	Succeeded by Javier Herrera Corona
