= Gratiana, Africa =

Africa Proconsularis (125 AD)

Gratiana was an ancient city and bishopric in Roman Africa, which remains a latin catholic titular see.

Today Gratiana survives as a titular bishopric and the current archbishop, personal title, is Francisco Escalante Molina, apostolic nuncio to the Republic of the Congo and Gabon.

== History ==
Gratiana, in modern Tunisia, was among the many towns of sufficient importance in the Roman province of Byzacena to become a suffragan of Carthage, but would completely fade, plausibly at the 7th century advent of Islam.

During the Roman Empire the bishopric was centered on a town (now lost to history) in the Roman province of Byzacena. Three of its bishops are historically documented:

- The Donatist bishop who attended the 411 Council of Carthage. On that occasion the seat had no Catholic bishops.
- Bishop Boniface took part in the synod assembled in Carthage in 484 by the Vandal king Huneric, after which Boniface was exiled like most Catholic bishops.
- Bishop Gennarus participated in the anti-monotheistic Council of Carthage (641).

== Titular see ==
The diocese was nominally restored in 1933 as a titular bishopric of Gratiana (Latin) / Graziana (Curiate Italian) / Gratianen(sis) (Latin adjective)

It has had the following incumbents, albeit so far none of the fitting Episcopal (lowest) rank but all archiepiscopal:

- Titular Archbishop Felice Pirozzi (Italian) (1961.10.28 – death 1975.07.25) as papal diplomat : Apostolic Delegate to Madagascar (1960.09.23 – 1967.01.09), Apostolic Nuncio (ambassador) to Venezuela (1967.01.09 – 1970.10.17) and as President of Pontifical Ecclesiastical Academy (1970.10.17 – 1975.07.25)
- Titular Archbishop Luigi Conti (Italian) (1975.08.01 – 2015.12.05) also as papal diplomat : Apostolic Delegate to Antilles (1975.08.01 – 1980.02.09), Apostolic Nuncio to Haiti (1975.08.01 – 1983.11.19), Apostolic Pro-Nuncio to Iraq (1983.11.19 – 1987.01.17), Apostolic Pro-Nuncio to Kuwait (1983.11.19 – 1987.01.17), Apostolic Nuncio to Ecuador (1987.01.17 – 1991.04.12), Apostolic Nuncio to Honduras (1991.04.12 – 1999.05.15), Apostolic Nuncio to Turkey (1999.05.15 – 2001.08.08), Apostolic Nuncio to Turkmenistan (1999.05.15 – 2001.08.08), Apostolic Nuncio to Libya (2001.08.08 – 2003.06.05) and Apostolic Nuncio to Malta (2001.08.08 – 2003.06.05)
- Titular Archbishop Francisco Escalante Molina (Venezuelan) (2016.03.19 – ...) again as papal diplomat : Apostolic Nuncio to Republic of Congo(-Brazzaville) (2016.03.19 – ...) and Apostolic Nuncio to Gabon (2016.05.21 – ...).

== See also ==
- List of Catholic dioceses in Tunisia
- Gratianopolis (disambiguation) name-related cities, including fellow (titular) sees
