= Apostolic Nunciature to Gabon =

Diplomatic post of the Holy See

The Apostolic Nunciature to Gabon is an ecclesiastical office of the Catholic Church in Gabon. It is a diplomatic post of the Holy See, whose representative is called the Apostolic Nuncio with the rank of an ambassador.

== List of papal representatives ==
Apostolic Pro-Nuncios

- Luigi Poggi (31 October 1967 – 21 May 1969)
- Ernesto Gallina (16 July 1969 - 13 March 1971)
- Jean Jadot (15 May 1971 - 23 May 1973)
- Luciano Storero (30 June 1973 - 14 July 1976)
- Giuseppe Uhac (15 January 1977 - 3 June 1981)
- Donato Squicciarini (16 September 1981 - 1 July 1989)
- Santos Abril y Castelló (2 October 1989 - 24 February 1996)

Apostolic Nuncios

- Luigi Pezzuto (7 December 1996 - 22 May 1999)
- Mario Roberto Cassari (3 August 1999 - 31 July 2004)
- Andrés Carrascosa Coso (26 August 2004 - 12 January 2009)
- Jan Romeo Pawłowski (18 March 2009 - 7 December 2015)
- Francisco Escalante Molina (21 May 2016 – 4 June 2021)
- Javier Herrera Corona (5 February 2022 – 22 November 2025)
- Relwendé Kisito Ouédraogo (10 February 2026 – present)
