= Ivo Scapolo =

Italian prelate of the Catholic Church (born 1953)

His Excellency, The Most Reverend Ivo Scapolo
- Apostolic Nuncio
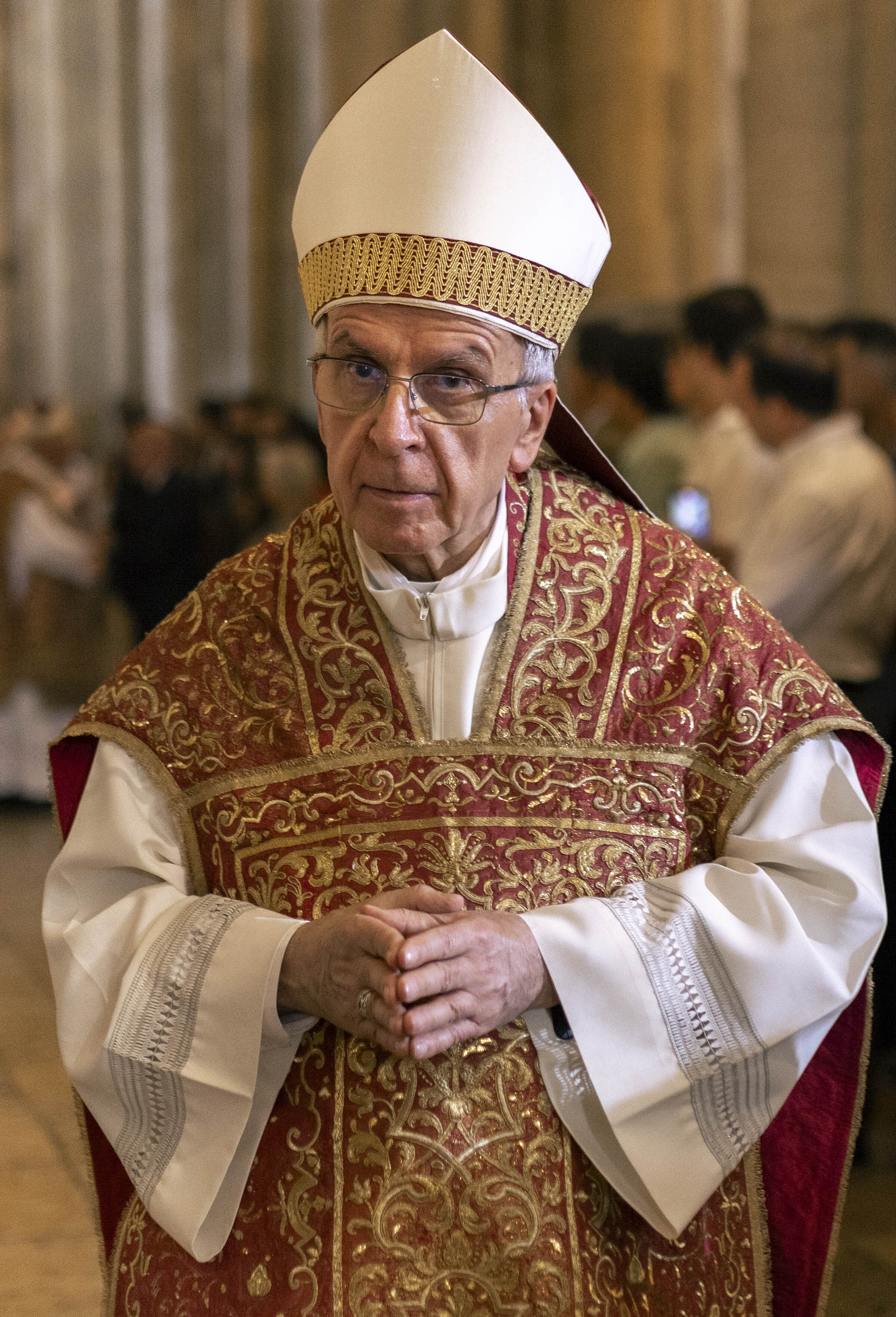
- Church: Roman Catholic Church
- Appointed: 29 August 2019
- Retired: 23 May 2025
- Predecessor: Rino Passigato
- Successor: Andrés Carrascosa Coso
- Other post: Titular Archbishop of Thagaste
- Previous posts: Apostolic Nuncio to Chile (2011-2019); Apostolic Nuncio to Rwanda (2008-2011); Apostolic Nuncio to Bolivia (2002-2008)

Orders
- Ordination: 4 June 1978 by Girolamo Bartolomeo Bortignon
- Consecration: 12 May 2002 by Angelo Sodano, Antonio Mattiazzo and Oscar Rizzato

Personal details
- Born: Ivo Scapolo; 24 July 1953 (age 72) Terrassa Padovana, Padua, Italy
- Motto: Ante omnia caritas

Styles of Ivo Scapolo
- Reference style: His Excellency; The Most Reverend
- Spoken style: Your Excellency
- Religious style: Archbishop

Ivo Scapolo (born 24 July 1953) is an Italian prelate of the Catholic Church who has worked in the diplomatic service of the Holy See since 1984, and served as nuncio in Bolivia, Rwanda, Chile and Portugal. He has been an archbishop since 2002.

== Early years ==
Ivo Scapolo was born 24 July 1953 in Terrassa Padovana, Province of Padua. He was ordained a priest on 4 June 1978 in Padua.

== Diplomatic career ==
After earning a doctorate in canon law, he entered the diplomatic service of the Holy See on 1 May 1984. He filled positions in the offices representing the Holy See in Angola, Portugal, and the United States, and worked in Rome in the Section for Relations with States of the Secretariat of State.

On 26 March 2002, Pope John Paul II named him Apostolic Nuncio to Bolivia and titular archbishop of Tagaste. He received his episcopal consecration on 12 May from Cardinal Angelo Sodano.

On 17 January 2008, Pope Benedict XVI named him Apostolic Nuncio to Rwanda,

On 15 July 2011, Pope Benedict named him Apostolic Nuncio to Chile.

=== Chile ===
Scapolo played a little role in resolving the clerical abuse crisis that brought intense Vatican scrutiny to Chile and the early retirement of several bishops. Several victims of clerical sexual abuse claimed he had long participated in preventing their claims from being heard. One of them, Juan Carlos Cruz, complained that Scapolo never met with victims of abuse and described him as "a blind guy, who does not hear the victims or have an interest in them".

Scapolo defended his role in the 2015 appointment of Juan Barros Madrid to be Bishop of Osorno, saying no information had been withheld from Vatican authorities. Nevertheless, Father Sergio Perez de Arce, whom Pope Francis named Apostolic Administrator of San Bartolome de Chillán as part of his reform of the Chilean hierarchy, said Scapolo "has not been and will not be the person with the sensitivity and skills needed to support a church in crisis like the Chilean one".

When Chile inaugurated its president in March 2018, the Holy See was represented by both Scapolo and Nicola Girasoli, the Apostolic Nuncio to Peru, which, according to La Tercera, church observers read as a sign that Scapolo was out of favour with the Vatican.

He received criticism in Chile for his link to controversial episcopal appointments, including that of Juan Barros Madrid, who was criticised for his connection to Fr. Fernando Karadima, who had been accused by multiple people of sexual misconduct. Some alleged victims claimed that Barros was present during Karadima's sexual acts, with one even saying that he participated in them.

==== Sexual abuse scandal ====
Regarding the sexual abuse scandals in Chile, Scapolo stated that it was "painful to see a reality of abuses in the Church" and that "we should all feel anger, pain and shame if someone commits an abuse, even more if it is against a minor, and moreover if it is committed by a person who, like the priest, has a special responsibility."

After the Pope's visit to Chile Scapolo admitted that he faced "an avalanche of denunciations, petitions and complaints" and that he thinks he has "done what is humanly possible to face it. I tried to act in accordance with the truth, justice and charity."

=== Portugal ===
Pope Francis named him Apostolic Nuncio to Portugal on 29 August 2019.

His appointment to the diplomatic post in Portugal was well received by the Portuguese Episcopal Conference who welcomed the appointment and wished Scapolo “a fruitful pastoral ministry as representative of the Holy See to the Church in Portugal and in diplomatic relations with the Portuguese State”. In a note sent to the Portuguese catholic news agency, ECCLESIA, the Portuguese Episcopal Conference also expressed hope that Bishop Scapolo exercised his duties as a "Man of God, of the Church, of apostolic zeal, of reconciliation, of the Pope, of initiative, obedience, prayer, active charity, humility."

In an October 2019 interview, he said that the role of women in the Church should be reviewed, citing his experience in Chile, where he saw the significance of women's contribution to Christian communities. He said he expected their role and responsibility expand.

On 23 May 2025, Pope Leo XIV accepted his resignation.

== See also ==
- List of heads of the diplomatic missions of the Holy See
