= Joseph Lê Văn Ấn =

Vietnamese Roman Catholic bishop

- Bishop of Xuân Lộc
- Native name: Giuse Lê Văn Ấn
- Church: Catholic Church
- Diocese: Diocese of Xuân Lộc
- In office: 14 October 1965 – 17 June 1974
- Predecessor: Diocese erected
- Successor: Dominique Nguyễn Văn Lãng

Orders
- Ordination: 19 March 1944
- Consecration: 9 January 1966 by Angelo Palmas

Personal details
- Born: 10 September 1916 Bồng Sơn, Bình Định province, Protectorate of Annam, Indochinese Union, French Empire
- Died: 17 June 1974 (aged 57)

Joseph Lê Văn Ấn (10 September 1916 − 17 June 1974) was a Vietnamese Roman Catholic bishop.

Ordained to the priesthood in 1944, Lê Văn Ấn was named bishop of the Roman Catholic Diocese of Xuân Lộc, Vietnam and ordained to the episcopate on 9 January 1966. He died in 1974 while still in office.
