= Apostolic Nunciature to Portugal =

Diplomatic post of the Holy See

The Apostolic Nunciature to the Republic of Portugal is an ecclesiastical office of the Catholic Church in Portugal. It is a diplomatic post of the Holy See, whose representative is called the Apostolic Nuncio with the rank of an ambassador. For much of the nineteenth and twentieth Centuries the holders of the office have gone on to hold positions in the Roman Curia that customarily been held by cardinals. This custom has now ceased, though is still in use in France.

== Apostolic nuncios to Portugal ==
- Antonio Pucci (1513 - 1515)
- Manuel de Noronha (1518)
- Martinho de Portugal (1527 - 1529)
- Marco Quinto Vigerio della Rovere (1532 - 1536)
- Girolamo Capodiferro (1536 - 1539)
- Ferdinando Vasconcellos de Menezes (20 December 1538 - 1542 ?)
- Luigi Lippomano (21 May 1542 - 27 June 1544)
- Giovanni Ricci di Montepulciano (27 June 1544 - 4 March 1550)
- Pompeo Zambeccari (4 March 1550 - 22 November 1553)
- Cardinal Henry of Portugal (Nov 1553 - 1560) (with the title of Legate)
- Prospero Santacroce (6 July 1560 - 10 May 1561)
- Giovanni Campeggi (10 May 1561 - 17 September 1563)
- Flaminio Donato di Aspra (1563 - 1574) (with the title of collector)
- Giovanni Andrea Caligari (16 October 1574 - 10 July 1577) (with the title of collector)
- Roberto Fontana (10 July 1577 - Nov 1578) (with the title of collector)
- Alessandro Frumento (12 November 1578 - 15 April 1580)
- Cardinal Alessandro Riario (15 April 1580 - 9 February 1583) (with the title of Legate)
- Roberto Fontana (9 February 1583 - 1584) (with the title of collector)
- Alfonso Visconti (14 May 1584 - 1586) (with the title of collector)
- Muzio Bongiovanni (22 February 1586 - 1588) (with the title of collector)
- Giovanni Battista Biglia (25 August 1588 - 1592) (with the title of collector)
- Fabio Biondi (1º Oct 1592 - 15 October 1596) (with the title of collector)
- Ferdinando Taverna (15 October 1596 - 17 March 1598) (with the title of collector)
- Decio Carafa (17 March 1598 - 1604) (with the title of collector)
- Fabrizio Caracciolo Piscizi (22 December 1604 - 31 January 1609) (with the title of collector)
- Gasparo Albertoni (31 January 1609 - 1614) (with the title of collector)
- Ottavio Accoramboni (4 June 1614 - 4 June 1620) (with the title of collector)
- Vincenzo Landinelli (4 June 1620 - 15 September 1621) (with the title of collector)
- Antonio Albergati (15 September 1621 - 27 February 1624) (with the title of collector)
- Giovanni Battista Maria Pallotta (8 June 1624 - 6 June 1626) (with the title of collector)
- Lorenzo Tramallo (12 April 1627 - 1634) (with the title of collector)
- Alessandro Castracani (30 September 1634 - 1640) (with the title of collector)
- Girolamo Battaglia (15 November 1640 - 30 September 1646) (with the title of collector)
- Vincenzo Nobili (18 February 1647 - after 1650) (with the title of collector)
- Francesco Ravizza (12 August 1670 - 12 April 1673)
- Marcello Durazzo (12 April 1673 - 5 May 1685)
- Francesco Niccolini (10 October 1685 - 24 January 1690)
- Sebastiano Antonio Tanara (26 May 1690 - 15 March 1692)
- Giorgio Cornaro (12 May 1692 - 22 July 1697)
- Michelangelo dei Conti (24 March 1698 - 7 June 1706)
- Vincenzo Bichi (14 September 1709 - 1720)
- Giuseppe Firrao (seniore) (28 September 1720 - 11 December 1730)
- Gaetano de Cavalieri (27 March 1732 - before 6 November 1738)
- Giacomo Oddi (25 February 1739 - 9 September 1743)
- Luca Melchiore Tempi (22 January 1744 - 26 November 1753)
- Filippo Acciaiuoli (28 January 1754 - 23 February 1761 expelled from Portugal)
- Vincenzo Ranuzzi (26 February 1782 - 14 February 1785)
- Carlo Bellisomi (7 May 1785 - 21 February 1794)
- Bartolomeo Pacca (21 March 1794 - 23 February 1801)
- Lorenzo Caleppi (23 December 1801 - 8 March 1816)
- Giovan Francesco Compagnoni Marefoschi (20 December 1816 - 17 September 1820)
- Giacomo Filippo Fransoni (21 January 1823 - 2 October 1826)
- Alessandro Giustiniani (24 April 1827 - 2 July 1832)
- Filippo de Angelis (13 November 1832 - 15 February 1838)
- Camillo Di Pietro (7 February 1844 - 16 June 1856)
- Innocenzo Ferrieri (16 June 1856 - 13 March 1868)
- Luigi Oreglia di Santo Stefano (29 May 1868 - 22 December 1873)
- Domenico Sanguigni (25 August 1874 - 19 September 1879)
- Gaetano Aloisi Masella (30 September 1879 - 25 June 1883)
- Vincenzo Vannutelli (3 October 1883 - 23 June 1890)
- Domenico Maria Jacobini (16 June 1891 - 22 June 1896)
- Andrea Aiuti (26 September 1896 - 12 November 1903)
- José Macchi (Jan 1904 - 7 June 1906)
- Giulio Tonti (4 October 1906 - 25 October 1910 )
- Achille Locatelli (13 July 1918 - May 1923 )
- Sebastiano Nicotra (30 May 1923 - 1928 )
- Beda Giovanni Cardinale, O.S.B. (21 June 1928 - 1 December 1933 )
- Pietro Ciriaci (9 January 1934 - 12 January 1953)
- Fernando Cento (26 October 1953 - 1958)
- Giovanni Panico (25 January 1959 - 1962)
- Maximilien de Fürstenberg (28 April 1962 - 26 June 1967)
- Giuseppe Sensi (8 July 1967 - 1976)
- Angelo Felici (13 May 1976 - 27 August 1979)
- Sante Portalupi (15 December 1979 - 31 March 1984)
- Salvatore Asta (21 July 1984 - 1989)
- Luciano Angeloni (31 July 1989 - 15 March 1993)
- Edoardo Rovida (15 March 1993 - 12 October 2002)
- Alfio Rapisarda (12 October 2002 - 8 November 2008)
- Rino Passigato (8 November 2008 - 4 July 2019)
- Ivo Scapolo (29 August 2019 – 23 May 2025)
- Andrés Carrascosa Coso (11 December 2025 - present)
