= Andrés Carrascosa Coso =

Spanish prelate of the Catholic Church (born 1955)

His Excellency, The Most Reverend Andrés Carrascosa Coso
- Apostolic Nuncio to Portugal; Titular Archbishop of Elo
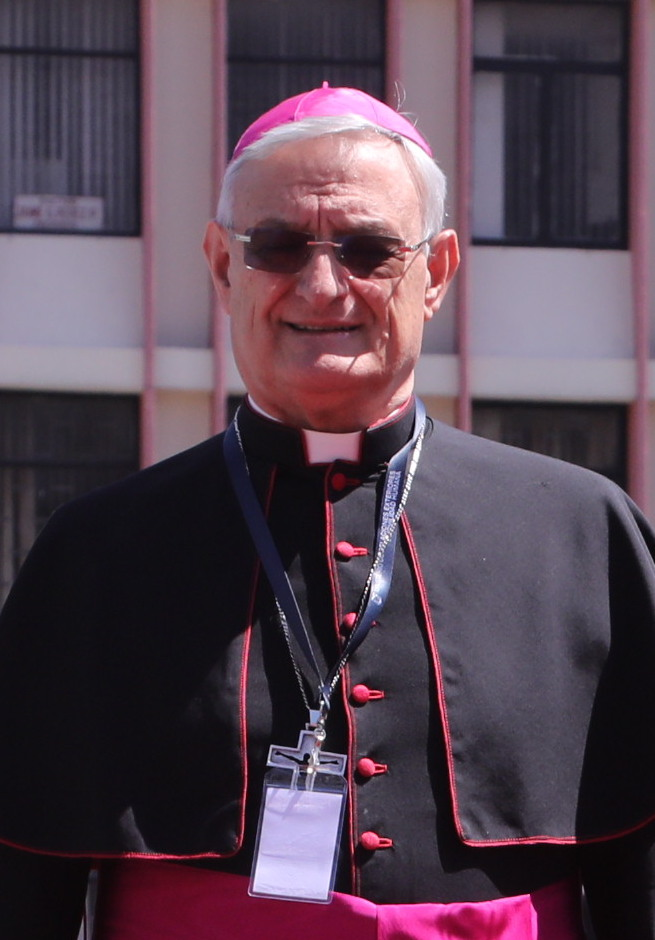
- Andrés Carrascosa Coso (2021)
- Church: Catholic Church
- Appointed: 22 June 2017
- Predecessor: Ivo Scapolo
- Other post: Titular Archbishop of Elo
- Previous posts: Apostolic Nuncio to the Republic of the Congo (2004–2009); Apostolic Nuncio to Gabon (2004–2009); Apostolic Nuncio to Panama (2009–2017); Apostolic Nuncio to Ecuador (2017–2025)

Orders
- Ordination: 2 July 1980 by José Guerra Campos
- Consecration: 7 October 2004 by Angelo Sodano, Robert Sarah, and Ramón del Hoyo López

Personal details
- Born: 16 December 1955 (age 70) Cuenca, Spain
- Occupation: Archbishop; diplomat
- Education: Major Seminary of Cuenca; Spanish College of Rome; Pontifical Ecclesiastical Academy; Pontifical University of Santo Tomas
- Motto: Unitatem Spiritus Servare
- Coat of arms: Andrés Carrascosa Coso's coat of arms

Styles of Andrés Carrascosa Coso
- Reference style: His Excellency; The Most Reverend
- Spoken style: Your Excellency
- Religious style: Archbishop

Andrés Carrascosa Coso (born 16 December 1955) is a Spanish prelate of the Catholic Church who works in the diplomatic service of the Holy See.

== Biography ==
Born in Cuenca, Spain on 16 December 1955, Andrés Carrascosa Coso was raised in the municipality of Alcázar del Rey. He studied at the Major Seminary of Saint Julian, and was ordained a priest of the Diocese of Cuenca on 2 July 1980.

== Diplomatic career ==
After completing his primary education, he studied philosophy and theology at the Major Seminary of Cuenca, and later took a one-year course on priestly spirituality in Frascati.

He was ordained a deacon on March 17, 1979, and received priestly ordination on July 2, 1980, both from Bishop José Guerra Campos, being incardinated in the Diocese of Cuenca.

He holds a licentiate in Biblical Theology from the Pontifical Gregorian University, as well as diplomatic training from the Pontifical Ecclesiastical Academy and a licentiate in Canon Law and a doctorate in International Law from the Pontifical University of St. Thomas Aquinas.

He joined the diplomatic service of the Holy See on May 1, 1985, and subsequently worked at the Pontifical Representations in Liberia and Denmark, the Council for Public Affairs of the Church, the Mission to the United Nations Office and Specialized Institutions in Geneva, and the Apostolic Nunciatures in Brazil and Canada.

On 31 July 2004, Pope John Paul II appointed Carrascosa Coso titular archbishop of Elo and Apostolic Nuncio to the Republic of the Congo. On 26 August he named him Nuncio to Gabon as well. He received his episcopal consecration on 7 October from Cardinal Angelo Sodano.

On 12 January 2009, Pope Benedict XVI appointed Carrascosa Coso Apostolic Nuncio to Panama.

On 22 June 2017, Pope Francis appointed Carrascosa Coso Apostolic Nuncio to Ecuador.

On 11 December 2025, Pope Leo XIV appointed him as Apostolic Nuncio to Portugal.

He is fluent in Spanish, Italian, French, English, German, and Portuguese.

== Decorations and honours ==
=== Foreign Honours ===
- Grand Officer of the Order of the Equatorial Star, in recognition of his service to Gabon
- Grand Cross of Order of Vasco Núñez de Balboa, in recognition of his services as nuncio to Panama.

== See also ==
- List of heads of the diplomatic missions of the Holy See
