= Umberto Benigni =

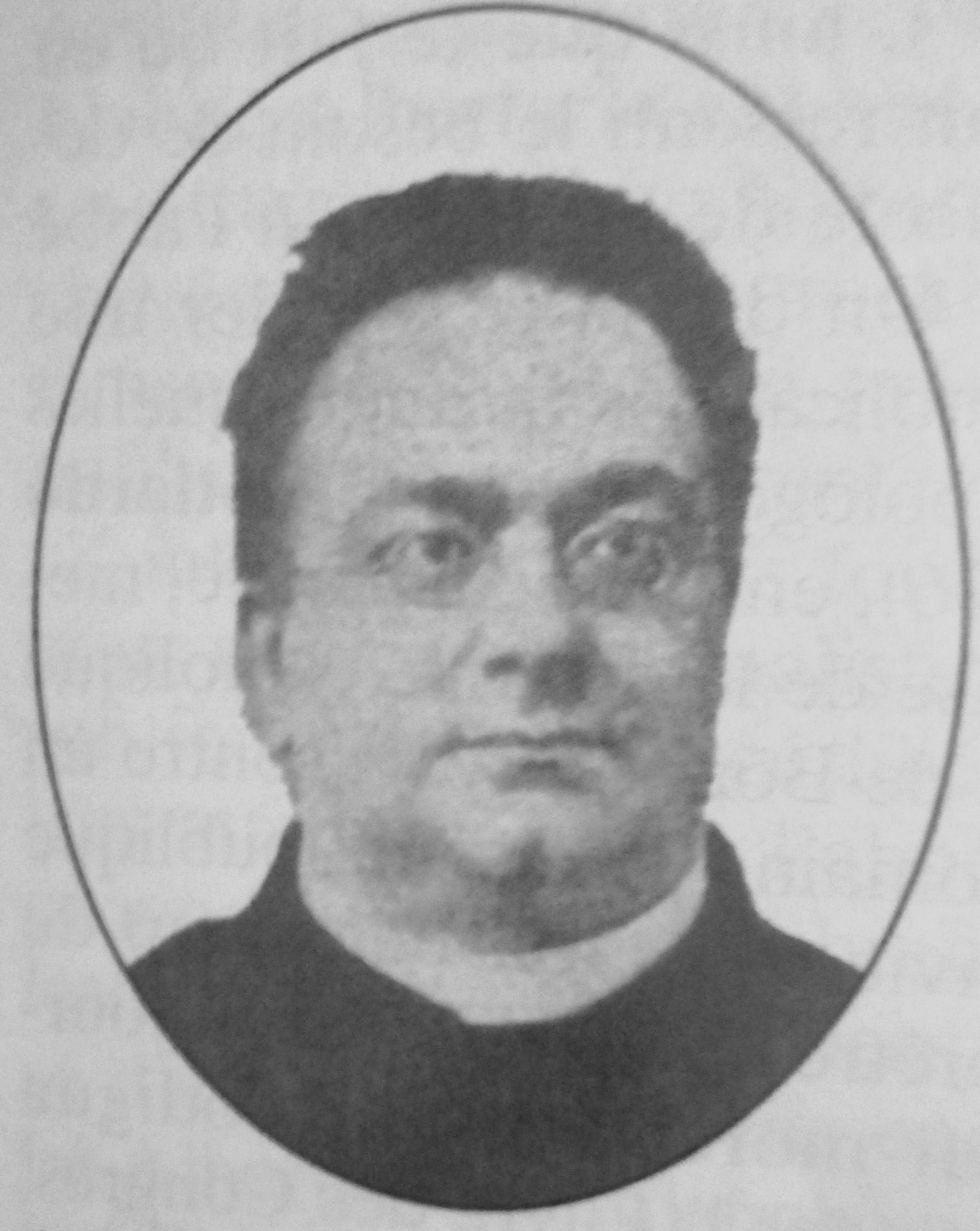
Benigni in c. 1910

Umberto Benigni (30 March 1862 – 27 February 1934) was a Catholic priest and Church historian, who was born in Perugia, Italy and died in Rome.

== Biography ==
A lecturer in Church history from 1885, one year after his ordination to the priesthood, he also engaged in journalism, at first locally, and became in 1893 editor in chief of the national daily newspaper L'Eco d'Italia. Due to a conflict with the Archbishop of Genoa, he moved to Rome in 1895, working at first as an assistant in the historical research section of the Vatican Library. In 1900 he began contributing to the newspaper La Voce della Verità, becoming its director in 1901, the same year in which he also became Professor of Church History at the seminary of the Diocese of Rome.

In 1902 he was given a position in the Roman Curia, and in 1906 was promoted to the post of Undersecretary of the Congregation for Extraordinary Ecclesiastical Affairs, the forerunner of what is today the Section for Relations with States of the Secretariat of State.

Monsignor Benigni proved to have special gifts for relations with the press. Beginning in 1907, he provided a daily news bulletin, La Corrispondenza di Roma, which became from 1909 to 1912 La Correspondance de Rome and in 1913–1914 Cahiers de Rome. This gave him influence over the contents of publications in many countries.

He set up among his contacts the Sodalitium Pianum (Fellowship of Pius V), to report to him those thought to be teaching Modernist doctrines.

His influence waned during the pontificate of Pope Benedict XV (1914–1922) making him ecclesiastically an isolated figure. He became close to the Fascist movement (in 1923 he founded the Entente romaine de Défense social) seeing in it an ally for his anti-Modernist and anti-liberal aims.

From 1906 to 1933 he authored a history of the Church in five volumes, spanning from Jesus Christ until the Middle Ages, but died before finishing it. While staying in Belgrade, he also published an antisemitic pamphlet supporting the blood libel, an antisemitic trope claiming that Jews killed Christian children to use their blood in ceremonies.

Monsignor Benigni died in Rome in 1934, aged 72; his writings and other documents in his possession at his death can be consulted at the Vatican Apostolic Archive.
