= Diocese of Xuân Lộc =

Roman Catholic diocese in Vietnam

Diocese of Xuân Lộc Dioecesis Xuanlocensis Giáo phận Xuân Lộc
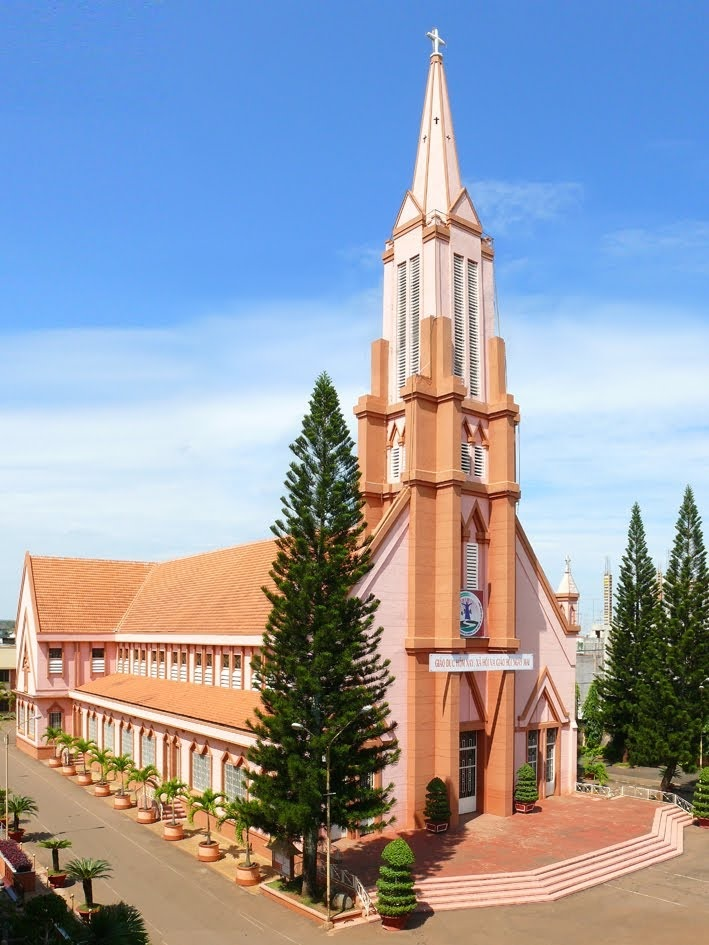
- Cathedral of Xuân Lộc

- Coat of arms of Bishop John Đỗ Văn Ngân

Location
- Country: Vietnam
- Ecclesiastical province: Saigon
- Coordinates: 10.931906°N 107.2432°E

Statistics
- Area: 5,965 km^{2} (2,303 sq mi)
- Population: Total; Catholics: (as of 2022); 3,910,000; 1,073,179 (27.4%)
- Parishes: 277

Information
- Denomination: Catholic
- Sui iuris church: Latin Church
- Rite: Roman Rite
- Established: 14 October 1965
- Cathedral: Christ the King in Long Khánh
- Patron saint: Saint Joseph
- Secular priests: 465

Current leadership
- Pope: Leo XIV
- Bishop: John Đỗ Văn Ngân
- Metropolitan Archbishop: Joseph Nguyễn Năng
- Auxiliary Bishops: Dominic Nguyễn Tuấn Anh
- Bishops emeritus: Joseph Đinh Đức Đạo; Dominique Nguyễn Chu Trinh

Website
- giaophanxuanloc.net

The Roman Catholic Diocese of Xuân Lộc (Latin: Dioecesis Xuanlocensis) is a suffragan Latin diocese in the ecclesiastical province of the Archdiocese of Saigon in southern Vietnam, yet depends on the missionary Dicastery for Evangelization.

Its cathedral episcopal see is Cathedral of Christ the King (Nhà thờ Chính toà Chúa Giêsu Vua), dedicated to Christ the King, in Long Khánh, Đồng Nai, Southeastern Vietnam. The bishop, since January 16, 2021, is John Đỗ Văn Ngân.

== History ==
- It was erected on 14 October 1965, as Diocese of Xuân Lôc / Xuân Lộc (Tiếng Việt) / 春祿 (正體中文) / Xuanlocen(sis) (Latin), on territory split off from its Metropolitan, the Archdiocese of Saigon (now Ho Chi Minh city)
- On 22 November 2005, it lost part of its territory to establish the Diocese of Ba Ria.

== Statistics ==
As of 2014, the diocese pastorally served 921,489 Catholics (30.5% of 3,020,800 total) on 5,964 km² in 246 parishes with 498 priests (359 diocesan, 139 religious), 2,256 lay religious (447 brothers, 1,809 sisters) and 168 seminarians.

== Bishops ==
(all Roman Rite)

=== Bishops of Xuân Lôc ===
1. Joseph Lê Văn Ấn (14 October 1965 - 17 June 1974)
2. Dominique Nguyên Văn Lãng (1 July 1974 - 22 February 1988)
3. Paul Marie Nguyễn Minh Nhật (22 February 1988 - 30 September 2004)
4. Dominique Nguyễn Chu Trinh (30 September 2004 - 7 May 2016)
5. Joseph Đinh Đức Đạo (7 May 2016 - 16 January 2021)
6. John Đỗ Văn Ngân (16 January 2021 – present)

=== Coadjutor Bishops ===
- Paul Marie Nguyễn Minh Nhật (16 July 1975 – 22 February 1988)
- Joseph Đinh Đức Đạo (4 June 2015 - 7 May 2016)

=== Auxiliary Bishops ===
1. Thomas Nguyễn Văn Trâm (6 March 1992 - 22 November 2005), appointed Bishop of Bà Rịa
2. Thomas Vũ Đình Hiệu (25 July 2009 - 24 December 2012), appointed Coadjutor Bishop of Bùi Chu and later succeeded
3. Joseph Đinh Đức Đạo (28 February 2013 - 4 June 2015), appointed Coadjutor Bishop and subsequently succeeded here
4. John Đỗ Văn Ngân (2 May 2017 - 16 January 2021), appointed Bishop here
5. Dominic Nguyễn Tuấn Anh (24 August 2024 - present)

=== Other secular clergy who became bishops ===
- Joseph Nguyễn Năng, appointed Bishop of Phát Diệm in 2009 and later Archbishop of Hồ Chi Minh City in 2019
- Emmanuel Nguyễn Hồng Sơn (priest here, 1980-2005), appointed Coadjutor Bishop of Bà Rịa in 2015 and later succeeded

== Sources and external links ==
- GCatholic - data for all sections
- catholic-hierarchy.org
