= Donato Squicciarini =

Italian Catholic archbishop

- Apostolic Nuncio to Austria
- Church: Catholic Church
- In office: 1 July 1989 – 8 October 2002
- Predecessor: Michele Cecchini
- Successor: Giorgio Zur
- Other post: Titular Archbishop of Tiburnia (1978-2006)
- Previous posts: Permanent Observer to United Nations Office and Specialized Agencies in Vienna (1990-1994); Apostolic Pro-Nuncio to Gabon, Cameroon & Equatorial Guinea (1981-1989); Apostolic Nuncio to Burundi (1978-1981)

Orders
- Ordination: 12 April 1952
- Consecration: 26 November 1978 by Franz König

Personal details
- Born: 24 April 1927 Altamura, Province of Bari, Kingdom of Italy
- Died: 5 March 2006 (aged 78) Rome, Italy

Donato Squicciarini (24 April 1927 – 5 March 2006) was an Italian Catholic archbishop who acted as Nuncio to Austria from 1989 to 2002.

Squicciarini was born at Altamura, Apulia on 24 April 1927. He was ordained priest 12 April 1952, and ordained bishop and titular Archbishop of Tiburnia 26 Nov 1978. He was Apostolic Pro-Nuncio to Gabon, Cameroun, and Equatorial Guinea from 1981 till 1989, and Apostolic Nuncio to Austria from 1 July 1989 until retirement on 8 October 2002.

He was involved in a controversy about an Order of Pius IX conferred on Kurt Waldheim. Donato Squicciarini received the Austrian Decoration of Honor in 2000. He died in Rome on 5 March 2006.
