= Diocese of Bà Rịa =

Roman Catholic diocese in Vietnam

Coordinates: 10.4971°N 107.1700°E

Diocese of Ba Ria Dioecesis Barianensis Giáo phận Bà Rịa

Catholic
- Coat of arms of Bishop Sơn

Location
- Country: Vietnam
- Ecclesiastical province: Sài Gòn
- Deaneries: Bà Rịa; Bình Giã; Long Hương; Vũng Tàu; Xuyên Mộc

Statistics
- Area: 1,988 km^{2} (768 sq mi)
- Population: Total; Catholics: (as of 2022); 1,181,302; 286,375 (24.2%)
- Parishes: 79

Information
- Denomination: Catholic
- Sui iuris church: Latin Church
- Rite: Roman Rite
- Cathedral: Cathedral of Saint Philip and Saint James in Bà Rịa
- Patron saint: Mary, Mother of God

Current leadership
- Pope: Leo XIV
- Bishop: Emmanuel Nguyễn Hồng Sơn
- Metropolitan Archbishop: Joseph Nguyễn Năng
- Vicar General: Joseph Võ Công Tiến
- Bishops emeritus: Thomas Nguyễn Văn Trâm

Website
- giaophanbaria.org

The Diocese of Bà Rịa (Latin: Dioecesis Barianensis) is a Latin rite suffragan diocese in the ecclesiastical province of the Metropolitan Archdiocese of Saigon, in southern Vietnam, yet it depends on the missionary Dicastery for Evangelization.

Its cathedral episcopal see is Cathedral of Mary, Mother of God, dedicated to the Apostles Saint Philip and Saint James, in the city of Bà Rịa, Bà Rịa–Vũng Tàu province, Southeastern Vietnam.

== History ==
The bishopric was established on 22 November 2005 as Diocese of Ba Ria / Bà Rịa (Tiếng Việt) / 巴地 (正體中文) / Barianen(sis) (Latin adjective), on territory detached from the Diocese of Xuân Lôc.

According to Jesuit missionaries, in 1670, in Xích Lam (Ðất Ðỏ), near Bà Rịa, there were nearly 300 Catholic families. According to a report of Bishop M. Labbé, in 1670, "Dong Nai had at least over 2,000 parishioners". According to Adrien Launay, in 1747, the Đồng Nai region already had parish communities in Bengo (Bến Gỗ), R. Dou-nai (Đồng Nai), Dalua (Đá lửa ?) Ke-tat (Cái Tắt / Cái Tắc ?) Dou-mon (Đồng Môn ?), R. Moxoai (Mô Xoài), Ba-ria (Bà Rịa), Nui-nua (Núi Nứa) and Ðất Ðỏ, under the care of MEP and Jesuit missionaries.

== Statistics and extent ==
As per 2014, the diocese pastorally served 254,302 Catholics (17.8% of 1,427,024 total) on an area of 1,989 km² in 84 parishes with 166 priests (101 diocesan, 65 religious), 799 lay religious (282 brothers, 517 sisters) and 71 seminarians.

== Ordinaries ==
=== Bishops of Bà Rịa (2005 – present) ===
| Bishops | | Coat of Arms | Period in office | Status |
|---|---|---|---|---|
| 1 | Bishop Thomas Nguyễn Văn Trâm | | November 22, 2005 – May 06, 2017 | Retired |
| 2 | Bishop Emmanuel Nguyễn Hồng Sơn | | May 06, 2017 – present | Current bishop |

=== Coadjutor Bishops ===
- Emmanuel Nguyễn Hồng Sơn (27 November 2015 – 6 May 2017)

== Diocesan superiors ==
- Vicar General: Joseph Võ Công Tiến
- Rector of St. Thomas Hải Sơn Seminary: Joseph Đoàn Như Nghĩa
- Chancellor of the Episcopal See: Jean Baptiste Nguyễn Văn Bộ
- Chief of Office of the Bishopric: Joseph Nguyễn Công Luận
- Dean of Bà Rịa: Joseph Đặng Cao Trí
- Dean of Vũng Tàu: Matthew Trần Bảo Long
- Dean of Long Hương: Alphonsus Nguyễn Văn Thế
- Dean of Bình Giã: Paul Lê Đình Hùng
- Dean of Xuyên Mộc: Peter Đinh Phước Đại

== See also ==
- List of Catholic dioceses in Vietnam

== Sources and external links ==
- GCatholic, with Google map & satellite photo - data for all sections
- Catholic-hierarchy.org
