= Urbano Navarrete Cortés =

Spanish Roman Catholic cardinal and professor

His Eminence Urbano Navarrete Cortés, S.J.
- Cardinal-Deacon of San Ponziano
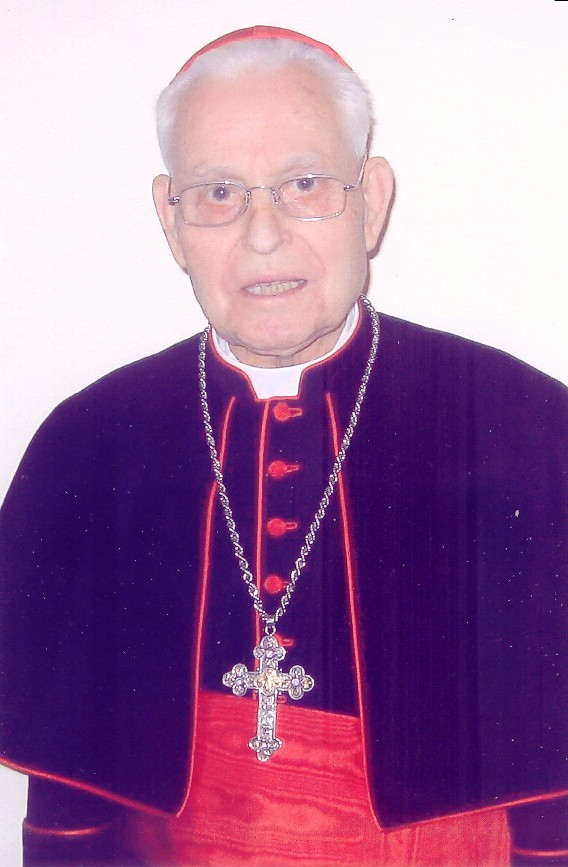
- Other post: Rector of the Pontifical Gregorian University (1980–1986)

Orders
- Ordination: 31 May 1952
- Created cardinal: 24 November 2007 (appointed); 13 January 2008 (installed)

Personal details
- Born: 25 May 1920 Camarena de la Sierra, Teruel, Spain
- Died: 22 November 2010 (aged 90) Rome, Italy
- Coat of arms

Styles of Urbano Navarrete Cortés
- Reference style: His Eminence
- Spoken style: Your Eminence
- Informal style: Cardinal

Urbano Navarrete Cortés, S.J. (25 May 1920 – 22 November 2010) was a Spanish Roman Catholic cardinal, professor of canon law and former rector of the Pontifical Gregorian University. He was made a cardinal in 2007 by Pope Benedict XVI.

== Biography ==
Cardinal Navarrete Cortés was born in Camarena de la Sierra, Teruel; his father was José Navarrete Esteban. He entered the Society of Jesus on 20 June 1937; after his licentiate in philosophy and in theology he obtained a doctorate in canon law. Cardinal Navarrete was ordained to the priesthood on 31 May 1952, during the International Eucharistic Congress. A world-renowned canonist, he then served as Dean of the Faculty of Canon Law at the Pontifical Gregorian University in Rome until 1980, when he was appointed rector. Navarrete was granted an honorary doctorate by the Pontifical University of Salamanca in 1994 and was a consultor to the Congregation for Divine Worship and the Discipline of the Sacraments in the Roman Curia.

On 17 October 2007, Pope Benedict XVI announced that he would elevate Navarrete to the College of Cardinals. The Pope honored Navarrete's request to be dispensed from the requirement of episcopal consecration, and, at the consistory in St. Peter's Basilica on 24 November 2007, Navarrete was created Cardinal Deacon of S. Ponziano. His appointment followed the precedent set by previous Popes for rewarding priests who have made significant contributions to the life and work of the Church.

Navarrete Cortés died on 22 November 2010.

Catholic Church titles
Position created	Cardinal-Deacon of San Ponziano; 24 November 2007 – 22 November 2010	Succeeded by Urbano Navarrete Cortés
