= Julio Murat =

Turkish prelate of the Catholic Church (born 1961)

His Excellency, The Most Reverend Julio Murat
- Apostolic Nuncio to Sweden, Iceland, Denmark, Finland and Norway; Titular Archbishop of Orange
- Appointed: 9 November 2022
- Predecessor: James Patrick Green
- Other post: Titular Archbishop of Orange
- Previous posts: Apostolic Nuncio to Zambia and Malawi (2012-2018); Apostolic Nuncio to Cameroon and Equatorial Guinea (2018-2022)

Orders
- Ordination: 25 May 1986 by John Paul II
- Consecration: 3 March 2012 by Tarcisio Bertone, Dominique Mamberti, and Savio Hon

Personal details
- Born: 18 August 1961 (age 65) İzmir, Turkey
- Motto: In Manus Tuas

Styles of Julio Murat
- Reference style: His Excellency; The Most Reverend
- Spoken style: Your Excellency
- Religious style: Archbishop

Julio Murat (born 18 August 1961) is a Turkish prelate of the Catholic Church who works in the diplomatic service of the Holy See. He has been an archbishop and a papal nuncio since 2012.

== Biography ==
Julio Murat was born on 18 August 1961 in İzmir, Turkey. He began his preparation for the priesthood in Rome, where on 25 May 1986 he was ordained a priest by Pope John Paul II in St. Peter's Basilica in the Vatican and was incardinated in the Archdiocese of İzmir. After his ordination he continued his education, studying canon law at the Pontifical Urban University. In 1991 Murat concluded his law studies, with his doctoral dissertation "I diritti soggettivi della buona fama e dell'intimità codificati nel Canone 220".

== Diplomatic career ==
In 1992 he entered the Pontifical Ecclesiastical Academy, and on 1 January 1994 began working in the Vatican diplomatic missions. Murat worked in Indonesia, Pakistan, Belarus, and Austria. Beginning in January 2003 he worked in the Section for Relations with States of the Secretariat of State of the Holy See.

On 27 January 2012, Pope Benedict XVI appointed him apostolic nuncio in Zambia and titular archbishop of Orange. Murat was consecrated a bishop on 3 March 2012 in Rome, by Secretary of State Tarcisio Bertone. On 6 June 2012, he was named nuncio to Malawi as well.

On 24 March 2018, Pope Francis named him apostolic nuncio to Cameroon. The responsibilities of Nuncio to Equatorial Guinea were added on 29 March.

On 9 November 2022, Pope Francis named him apostolic nuncio to Sweden and Iceland. On 25 January 2023, Pope Francis named him apostolic nuncio to Denmark as well. On 7 March 2023, Pope Francis named him apostolic nuncio to Finland as well. On 16 March 2023, Pope Francis named him apostolic nuncio to Norway as well

== See also ==
- List of heads of the diplomatic missions of the Holy See
