= Sodalitium Pianum =

Catholic organization

Sodalitium Pianum is Latin for "the fellowship of Pius", i.e. Society of St. Pius V, which in France was known as La Sapinière. Its purpose was to enforce the prohibition on the Modernist heresy declared by Pope Pius X in 1907.

Monsignor Umberto Benigni organized, through his personal contacts with theologians, this unofficial group of censors who would report to him those thought to be teaching condemned doctrine. It never had more than fifty members, who sometimes employed overzealous espionage methods such as opening and photographing private letters, and examining the records of bookshops to see who was buying what. Among those it investigated was the teacher of church history, Angelo Roncalli (later Pope John XXIII).

Historians are divided in their opinions about the extent to which Pius X was aware of or approved Benigni's initiatives. Cardinal Secretary of State Rafael Merry del Val prevented the association from gaining canonical recognition, and the competent department of the Roman Curia disbanded it in 1921 on the grounds of "changed circumstances". According to Yves Congar OP, the network remained operational to some degree until the early years of World War II.
