= List of nuncios of the Holy See to China =

The Holy See nuncio in Taipei is the official representative of the government in Vatican City to the government of Taiwan.

== List of representatives ==
=== Apostolic delegates to China (1922–1946) ===
In 1922 Celso Benigno Luigi Costantini was appointed by the Holy See as Apostolic Delegate to China, without diplomatic status.

Name	Name in Chinese	Nationality	Assumed office	Left office
Celso Benigno Luigi Costantini	剛恆毅 Gāng Héngyì	Italy	12 August 1922	1933
Mario Zanin	蔡寧 Cài Níng	Italy	7 January 1934	1946

=== Apostolic internuncios to China (1946–1966) ===
Name	Name in Chinese	Nationality	Assumed office	Presentation of credentials	Left office
Antonio Riberi	黎培理 Lí Péilǐ	Monaco	6 July 1946	28 December 1946	1951
The Apostolic Nunciature to China was relocated to Taiwan in 1952 after the People's Republic of China broke off diplomatic ties with the Holy See.
Giuseppe Caprio	高理耀 Gāo Lǐyào	Italy	20 May 1959	29 October 1959	24 December 1966

=== Apostolic nuncios to China (1966–present) ===
Name	Name in Chinese	Nationality	Assumed office	Presentation of credentials	Left office	Diplomatic title
Giuseppe Caprio	高理耀 Gāo Lǐyào	Italy	24 December 1966	30 January 1967	22 August 1967	Apostolic Pro-Nuncio
Luigi Accogli	艾可儀 Ài Kěyí	Italy	16 October 1967	23 December 1967"	29 September 1970	Apostolic Pro-Nuncio
Edward Idris Cassidy	葛錫迪 Gé Xīdí	Australia	27 October 1970	5 December 1970	25 October 1971	Apostolic Pro-Nuncio
The post has been vacant since 25 October 1971, when the nuncio was recalled by the Holy See from Taiwan and represented by chargés d'affaires.

==== Chargés d'affaires ====
Name	Name in Chinese	Nationality	Assumed office	Left office
Francesco Colasuonno	高樂天 Gāo Lètiān	Italy	2 August 1972	1974
Thomas A. White	陶懷德 Táo Huáidé	Ireland	1974	1978
Paolo Giglio	吉立友 Jí Lìyǒu	Malta	12 July 1978	1986
Piero Biggio	畢齊樂 Bì Qílè	Italy	6 April 1986	1988
Adriano Bernardini	裴納德 Péi Nàdé	Italy	17 January 1989	1992
Juliusz Janusz	尤雅士 Yóu Yǎshì	Poland	25 August 1992	1995
Joseph Chennoth	車納德 Chē Nàdé	India	26 April 1995	1999
Adolfo Tito Yllana	易福霖 Yì Fúlín	Philippines	20 September 1999	6 January 2002
James Patrick Green	格霖澤 Gé Línzé	United States	18 January 2002	2003
Ambrose Madtha	安博思 Ān Bósī	India	11 February 2003	8 May 2008
Paul Fitzpatrick Russell	陸思道 Lù Sīdào	United States	8 May 2008	19 March 2016
Slađan Ćosić	高德隆 Gāo Délóng	Bosnia and Herzegovina	3 May 2016	10 August 2019
Arnaldo Sanchez Catalan	佳安道 Jīa Āndào	Philippines	10 August 2019	31 January 2022
Stefano Mazzotti	馬德範 Mǎ Défàn	Italy	19 July 2022 (Note: Arrived to Taipei on 22 August 2022)	incumbent
