= Holy See–Taiwan relations =

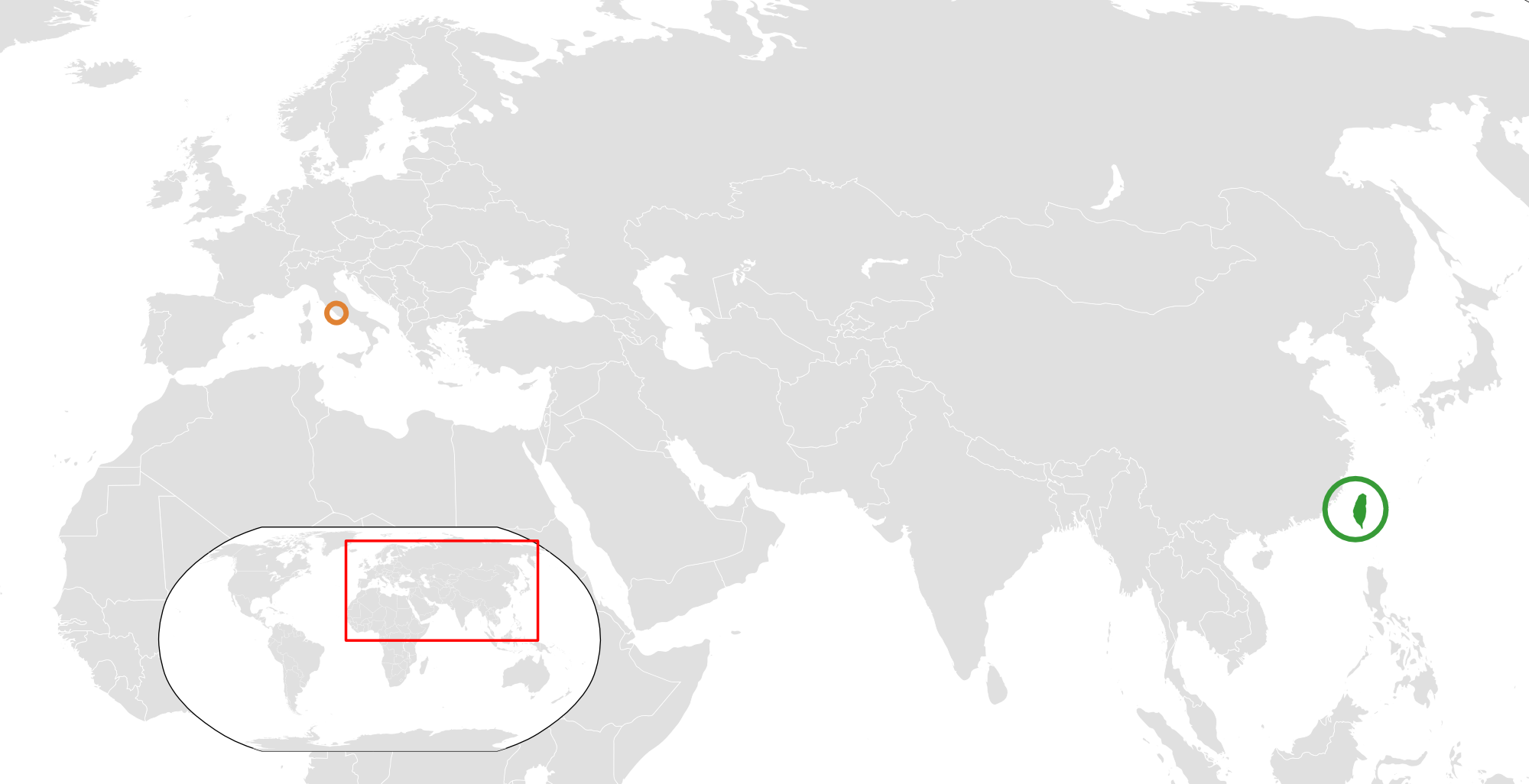
- Taiwan: Holy See

Diplomatic mission
- Embassy of China to the Holy See: Apostolic Nunciature to China

Envoy
- Ambassador Matthew S. M. Lee: Chargé d'affaires Pavol Talapka

Diplomatic relations between the Holy See and the Republic of China (Taiwan) were established on a non-diplomatic level in 1922 and at a diplomatic level in 1942. The Holy See conducts its relationship with China through formal diplomatic relations with Taiwan. It does not have formal diplomatic relationship with the People's Republic of China.

The bilateral relationship is particularly important to the ROC, as its embassy to the Holy See is Taiwan's only remaining embassy in Europe.

== Framework ==
Officially, the Holy See has maintained relations with "China" since 23 October 1942, but does not strictly clarify which government it considers to be "China." Unofficially, the Holy See views the Republic of China as the representative government, and maintains diplomatic relations with the ROC, with an embassy in Taipei. In 2018, the PRC and the Holy See signed an agreement allowing the pope to appoint bishops, potentially indicating a willingness to shift recognition to the PRC. When arranged alphabetically with other heads of state in Vatican ceremonies, ROC presidents are arranged under "Chine", French for "China" (French being the diplomatic language of the Holy See).

The Holy See maintains negotiations with the PRC for recognition, however the Holy See has given the ROC assurances that any negotiations with the PRC will not come at the expense of their relations with the ROC. The diplomatic relationship is significant from the perspective of the ROC because its embassy to the Holy See is its only remaining embassy in Europe.

== History ==
=== Before ROC retreat to Taiwan ===
Agreement to establish diplomatic relations between the Holy See and the Republic of China was reached in 1917. However, this move was blocked by France, which by the treaties imposed on China at the end of the Second Opium War held a "protectorate" over the Catholic missions in the country.

In 1922, Archbishop Celso Benigno Luigi Costantini was appointed to head an Apostolic Delegation in the country. Though Archbishop Costantini did not have diplomatic status, the Chinese government gave him the same honours as those granted to the diplomatic corps accredited to China at the funeral of Sun Yat-sen in 1925. Archbishop Costantini left China in 1933 and was succeeded by Archbishop Mario Zanin, who likewise was given all the honours reserved for Ministers Plenipotentiary.

After Japan succeeded in its invasion of Manchuria and the 1932 establishment of its Manchukuo puppet state, the Vatican retained its presence in the occupied region. This initially resulted in tension between the ROC and Vatican, but the Vatican ultimately satisfied the ROC that it needed to maintain its presence in the occupied region for the benefit of Catholics there and that the Vatican's presence did not imply an acceptance of the Manchukuo state.

Diplomatic relations were finally established on 23 October 1942 and, with the presentation by Archbishop Antonio Riberi of his letter of credence to the President in 1946, the Holy See's Apostolic Delegation in China gained diplomatic status.

In summer 1949, as the Chinese Civil War neared its end, Chinese Communist Party (CCP) forces captured the Nationalist capital, Nanjing. The Nationalist government retreated to Guangzhou. Although most of the diplomatic corps in Nanjing also went to Guangzhou, the nuncio remained in Nanjing. Pius XII instructed all Chinese bishops to remain in place.

In 1950, the Holy See stated that participation in CCP-related organizations would result in excommunication. The People's Republic of China broke off diplomatic relations with the Holy See in 1951. The CCP framed these actions in terms of Chinese Catholics reclaiming their church in the context of broader opposition to Western imperialism.

=== ROC on Taiwan ===
In the following year, the Holy See, having been rejected by the Beijing government, resumed relations with the previous (Nationalist) government, which after its defeat on the mainland had retreated to Taiwan and continued to claim to represent all of China under the name of "Republic of China", as before.

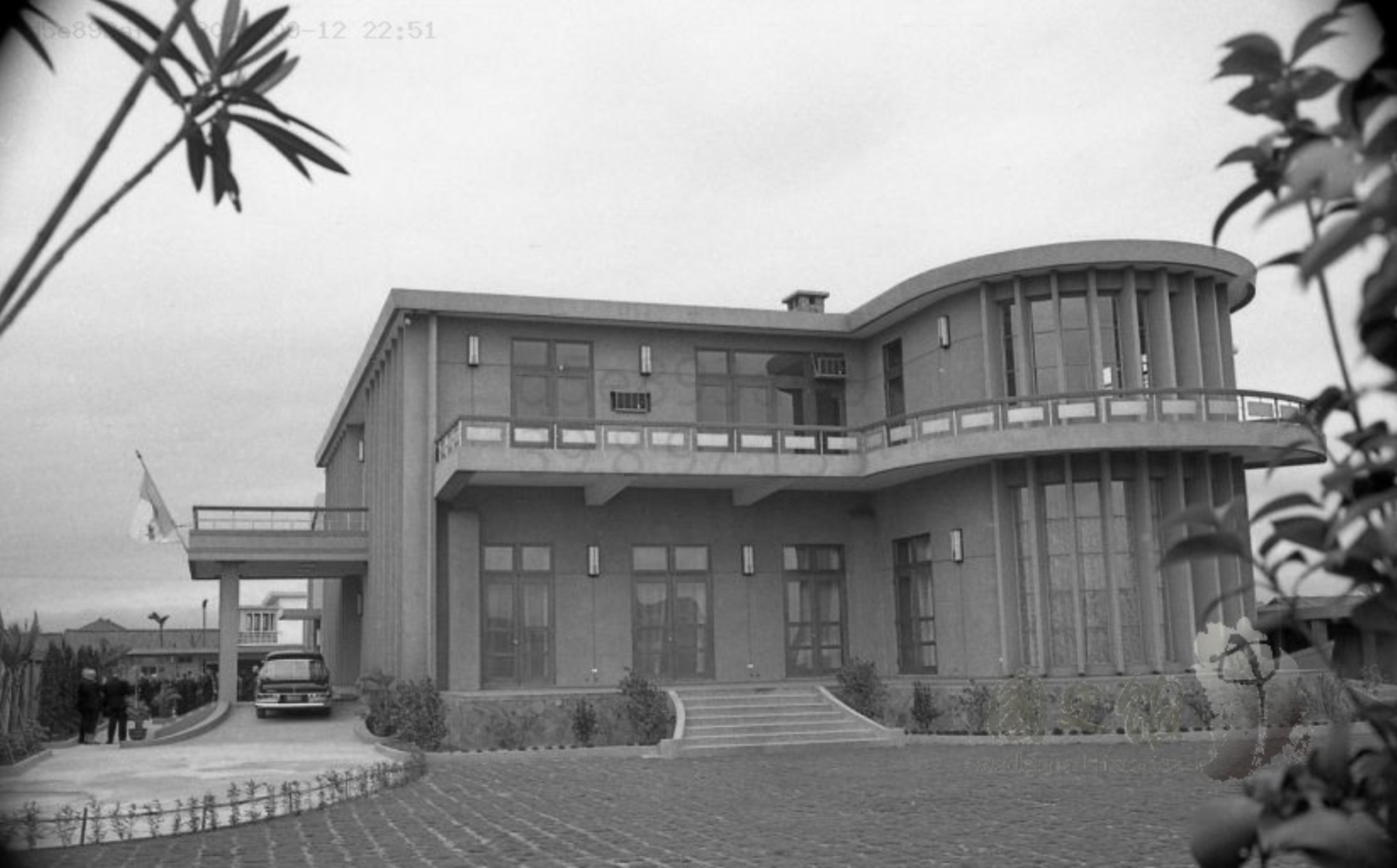
Embassy of Vatican, 1964

The United Nations continued to recognize the Taipei-based government as that of China until 25 October 1971. On that date, the seat of charter member of the United Nations and permanent member of the Security Council, China, passed to the Beijing government (PRC). The Holy See downgraded its diplomatic relationship with the ROC. The Holy See's downgrading of its relationship resulted from factors which included, in addition to the increased international recognition of the PRC, the Vatican's desire to increase ties to the Catholic Church in mainland China, and the PRC's increasing ties with the West generally.

The nuncio to China, Edward Cassidy, was in 1972 named nuncio to Bangladesh and moved from Taipei to Dhaka (he continued to hold both nuncio posts simultaneously). Cassidy's move left a chargé d'affaires heading the Holy See's embassy in Taipei. Cassidy left office in 1979 and the Holy See has not named a new nuncio to China; its embassy in Taipei continues to be headed by a chargé d'affaires. The Vatican began using "Taiwan" in papal references instead of "Republic of China" beginning in 1980.

The Taipei government has made no change in the status of the embassy to the Holy See that it maintains in Rome.

In Spring 2005, President Chen Shui-bian attended the funeral of Pope John Paul II. According to academic Peter Moody, Chen apparently attended on his own initiative, not the Vatican's invitation. The PRC protested Chen's attendance, describing it as "an opportunity to engage in secessionist activity". The Vatican sent Cardinal Jean-Louis Tauran to Taiwan in November to express the Holy See's view of relations. Tauran stated that the nunciature in Taipei was the same as the one in Nanjing more than 50 years earlier. If relations with the PRC normalized, the nunciature would move to Beijing and diplomatic ties with Taiwan could be replaced with cultural and academic relations.

In March 2013, President Ma Ying-jeou attended the inauguration of Pope Francis. The PRC protested and, according to academic Peter Moody, apparently boycotted the event as a result. The Vatican stated that no specific invitations had been sent to any country and that "No one is privileged, no one is refused, everyone is welcome if they say they are coming". No pope has ever visited the ROC. President Tsai Ing-wen unsuccessfully invited Pope Francis to visit several times.

== Gallery ==
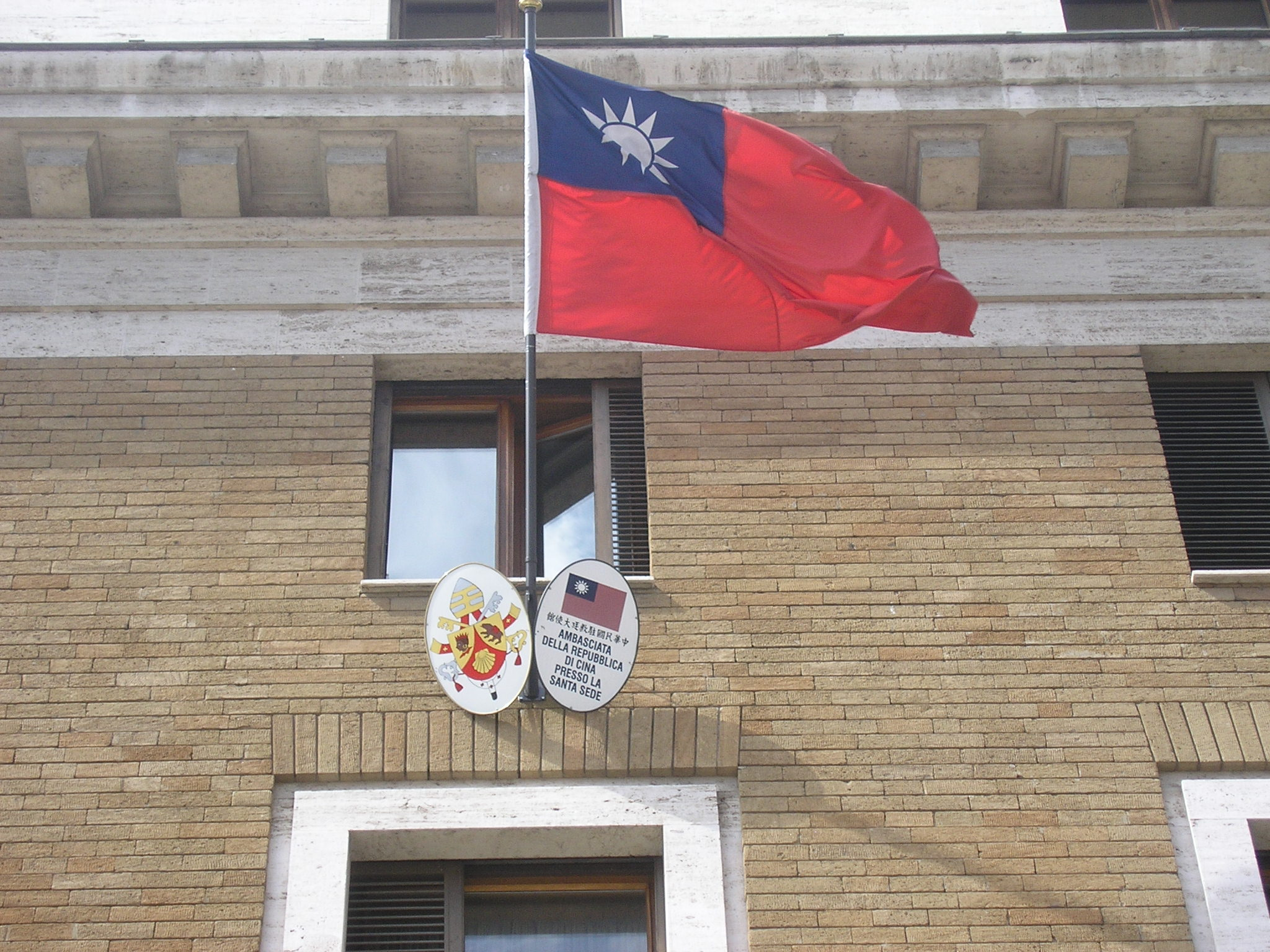
Like all other resident embassies to the Holy See, that of the Republic of China is located in Rome, outside of Vatican City, in a country with which the ROC has no diplomatic links

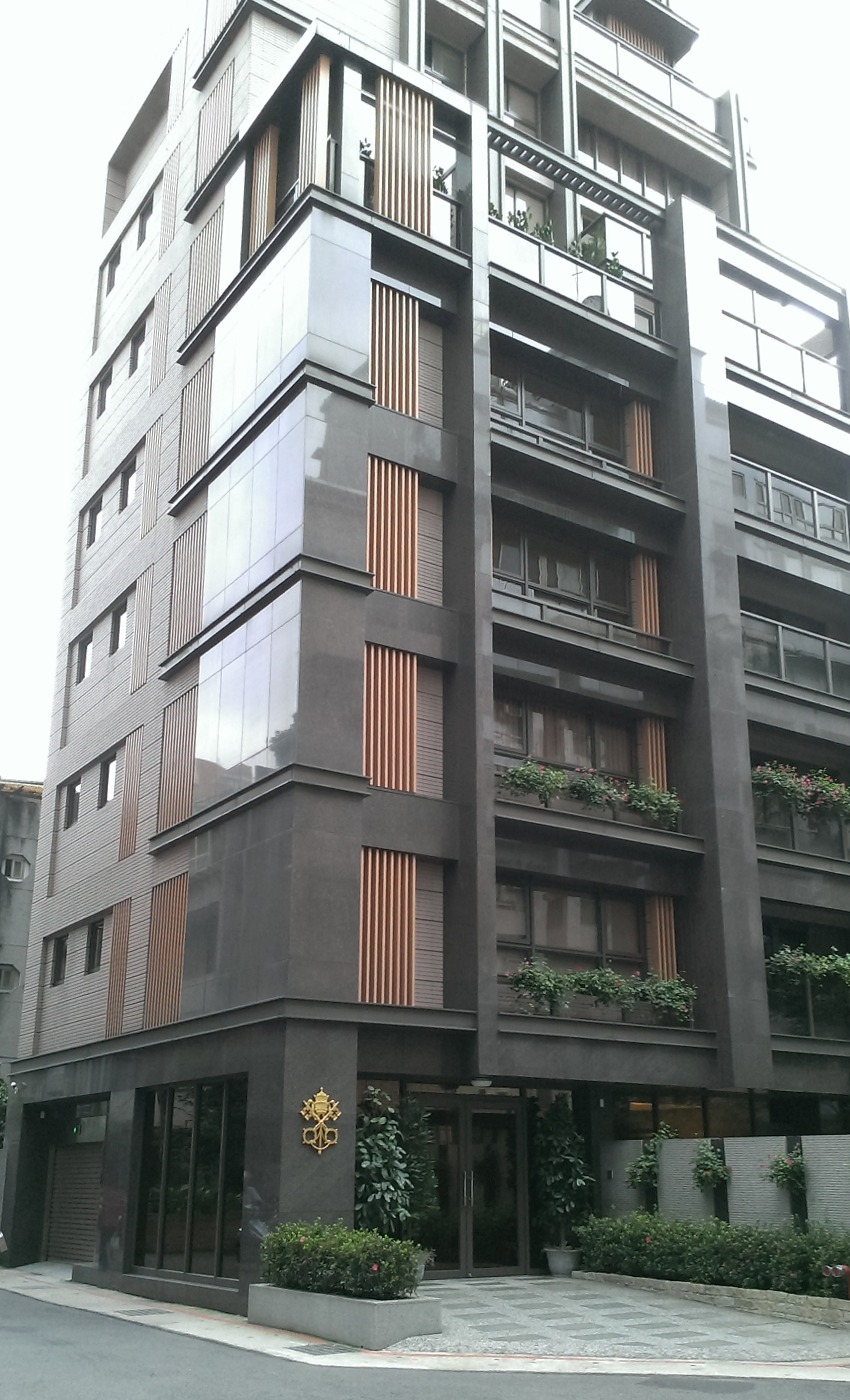
Apostolic Nunciature in Taipei, Taiwan

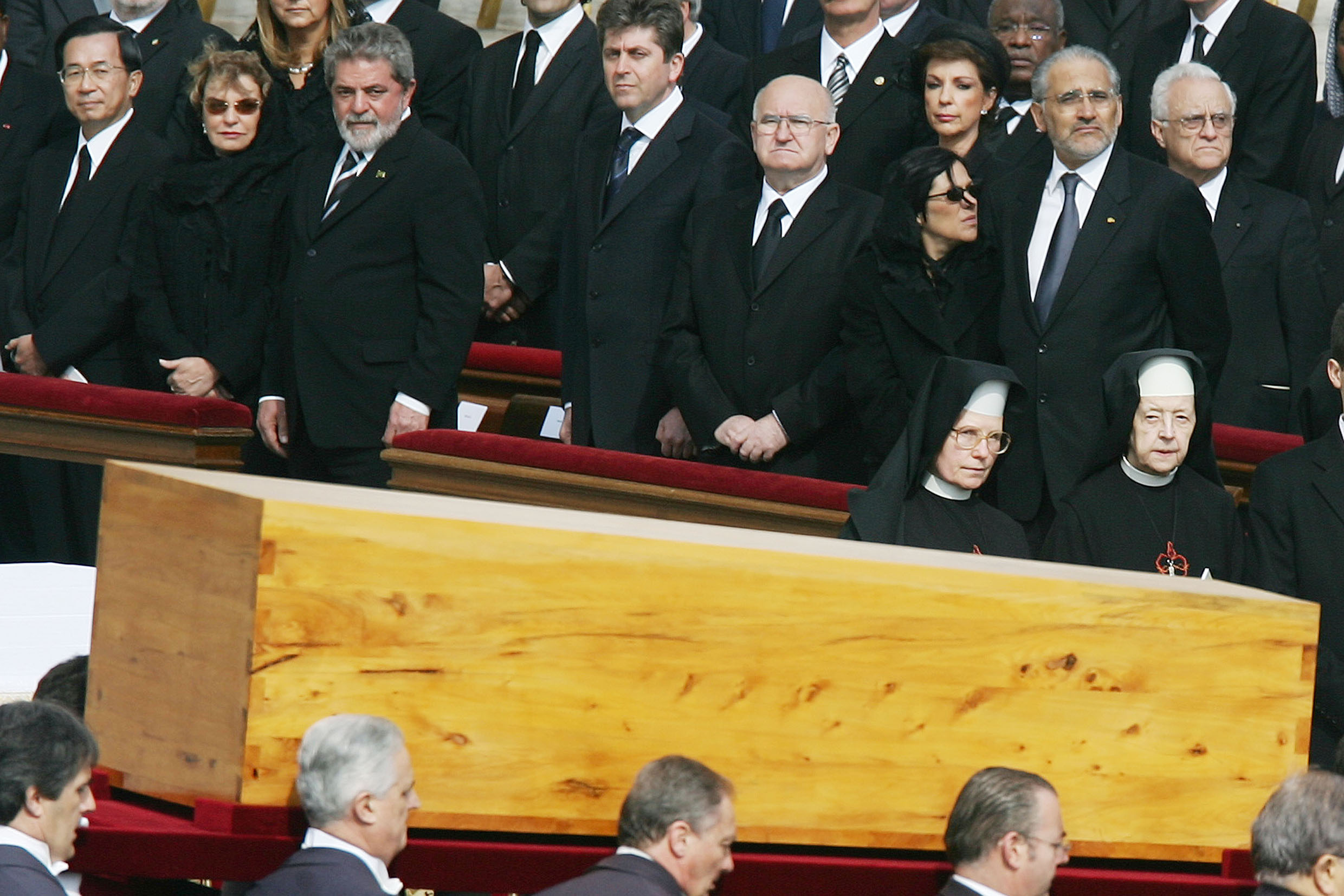
At the funeral of Pope John Paul II, Taiwan's President Chen Shui-bian (far left), seated as head of state in French alphabetical order (Chine immediately after Brésil) beside President Luiz Inácio Lula da Silva of Brazil and his wife

== See also ==
- Apostolic Nunciature to China
- Embassy of the Republic of China to the Holy See
- Foreign relations of the Holy See
- Foreign relations of the Republic of China
- Pope Pius XII and China
- Roman Catholicism in China
- Chinese Catholic Bishops Conference
- China–Holy See relations
- Fu Jen Catholic University
