= Alfredo Bruniera =

Italian prelate (1906–2000)

- Vice President of the Pontifical Council Cor Unum
- Church: Catholic Church
- In office: 6 November 1978 – 10 December 1981
- Predecessor: Bernardin Gantin
- Successor: Alois Wagner
- Other post: Titular Archbishop of Claudiopolis in Honoriade (1954-2000)
- Previous posts: Apostolic Nuncio to Lebanon (1969-1978); Apostolic Pro-Nuncio to Kuwait (1969-1975); Apostolic Nuncio to Uruguay (1965-1969); Apostolic Nuncio to Ecuador (1959-1965); Apostolic Delegate to Belgian Congo (1954-1959)

Orders
- Ordination: 9 July 1933
- Consecration: 2 January 1955 by Celso Benigno Luigi Costantini

Personal details
- Born: 30 December 1906 San Pelagio, Princely County of Gorizia and Gradisca, Cisleithania, Austria-Hungary
- Died: 26 March 2000 (aged 93)

Alfredo Bruniera (30 September 1906 – 26 March 2000) was an Italian prelate of the Catholic Church who spent his career in the diplomatic service of the Holy See.

== Biography ==
Alfredo Bruniera was born in San Pelagio on 30 September 1906 and studied at the seminary in Treviso. He was ordained a priest of the Diocese of Treviso by Giacinto Longhin on 9 July 1933. He did parish work until February 1934 when he became secretary to the newly appointed Apostolic Delegate to China Mario Zanin. He later worked in the nunciatures in Chile and Argentina.

On 12 December 1954, Pope Pius XII appointed him a titular archbishop and Apostolic Delegate to the Belgian Congo. He received his episcopal consecration on 2 January 1955 from Cardinal Celso Costantini.

On 25 April 1959, Pope John XXIII named him Apostolic Nuncio to Ecuador.

On 23 October 1965, he was appointed Apostolic Nuncio to Uruguay by Pope Paul VI.

On 23 April 1969, he was appointed Apostolic Nuncio to Lebanon. To that was added the responsibilities of the Apostolic Pro-Nuncio to Kuwait on 7 July 1969; he was the first to head that nunciature. He was replaced in Kuwait by Jean Rupp on 4 March 1975.

His service as nuncio ended when he was appointed Vice President of the Pontifical Council Cor Unum by Pope John Paul II on 6 November 1978. He retired from the Council upon the appointment of his successor, Alois Wagner, on 10 December 1981.

He died on 26 March 2000.
