= Apostolic Nunciature to Ecuador =

Diplomatic post of the Holy See

The Apostolic Nunciature to Ecuador is an ecclesiastical office of the Catholic Church in Ecuador. It is a diplomatic post of the Holy See, whose representative is called the Apostolic Nuncio with the rank of an ambassador.

== List of papal representatives ==
- Lorenzo Barili (26 May 1851 – 17 June 1856)
- Mieczyslaw Halka Ledóchowski (17 June 1856 – 25 July 1861)
- Francesco Tavani (25 July 1861 – 18 July 1869)
- Serafino Vannutelli (23 July 1869 – 15 March 1875)
- Mario Mocenni (6 August 1877 – 27 February 1882)
- Cesare Sambucetti (30 March 1882 – 1883)
- Beniamino Cavicchioni (21 March 1884 – 4 August 1889)
- José Macchi (12 April 1889 – 2 August 1897)
- Pietro Gasparri (18 December 1897 – 23 April 1901)
- Alessandro Bavona (13 July 1901 – 13 November 1906)
- Fernando Cento (6 August 1937 – 26 November 1937)
- Efrem Forni (26 November 1937 – 9 November 1953)
- Opilio Rossi (21 November 1953 – 25 March 1959)
- Alfredo Bruniera (25 April 1959 – 23 October 1965)
- Giovanni Ferrofino (3 November 1965 – 29 September 1970)
- Luigi Accogli (29 September 1970 – 6 July 1979)
- Vincenzo Maria Farano (25 August 1979 – 14 August 1986)
- Luigi Conti (17 January 1987 – 12 April 1991)
- Francesco Canalini (20 July 1991 – 5 December 1998)
- Alain Paul Charles Lebeaupin (7 December 1998 – 14 January 2005)
- Giacomo Guido Ottonello (26 February 2005 – 1 April 2017)
- Andrés Carrascosa Coso (22 June 2017 – 11 December 2025)
- Dagoberto Campos Salas (1 May 2026 – present)
