= Chen Yuandu =

Chinese painter (1902–1967)

Chen Yuandu (Chinese: 陳緣督) (March 1902 – December 1967) was a Chinese painter who played a significant role in the localisation of Christian paintings in modern China. Under the influence of the Catholic Cardinal Celso Constantini, He became Catholic and was baptised as Luke Chen in 1932. He was also professor of National Peking Arts College, the Beijing Academy of Fine Arts, Fine Arts Department of Fu Jen Catholic University, lecturer of Beijing Art Teachers College at the Central Academy of Arts, professor of Chinese Artists Association.

He was born in Meixian in Guangdong Province. At the age of 17, he became an apprentice of the master of Chinese painting, Jin Beilou, who founded the Chinese Painting Research Association and the Lake Club Painting Association, the latter of which become the Chinese Painting Academy after 1949. Chen joined both Associations in 1923 and in 1927, respectively.

In 1922, Celso Costantini was appointed by Pope Pius XI as the first Apostolic Delegate to China. In 1930, under the leadership of Costantini, Fu Jen Catholic University established its Department of Fine Arts, which aimed to "use native art as a means of spreading the Catholic faith." Although Chen Yuandu then was not a Christian, Constaniti invited him Yuandu to join the newly established department. Chen later became attracted by Christian arts and faith, and was baptised in 1932. Through his role in Fu Jen, he began to exert considerable influence on generations of Christian painters in modern China.

Chen was persecuted during the Cultural Revolution and committed suicide in 1967.
