= Embassy of Taiwan, Holy See =

Republic of China de jure embassy in the Vatican

Embassy of the Republic of China (Taiwan) to the Holy See
- 中華民國駐教廷大使館
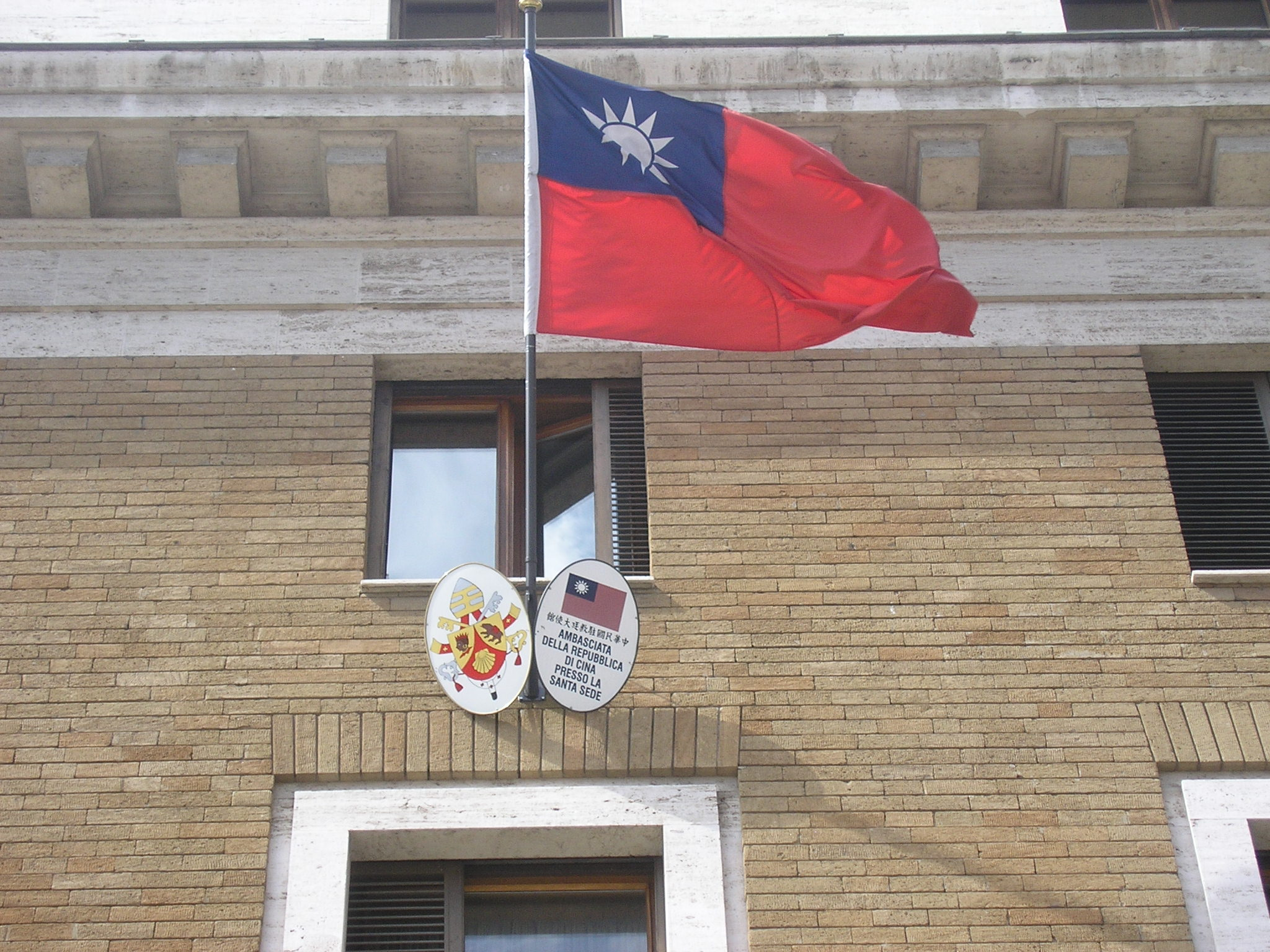
- Republic of China Embassy in Rome

Agency overview
- Formed: 1942 (in the Vatican City); 1996 (in Rome)
- Jurisdiction: Holy See; Sovereign Military Order of Malta
- Headquarters: Rome, Italy; 41.9026°N 12.4634°E
- Agency executive: Matthew S.M. Lee, Ambassador
- Website: Embassy of the Republic of China (TAIWAN) to the Holy See

The Embassy of the Republic of China (Taiwan) to the Holy See (Chinese: 中華民國駐教廷大使館) is the diplomatic mission of the Republic of China (also known as Taiwan) accredited to the Holy See, one of its few de jure embassies in the world, and the only one remaining in Europe. It also has responsibility for relations with the Sovereign Military Order of Malta.

Its counterpart in the Republic of China is the Apostolic Nunciature to China in Taipei.

It is separate from the Taipei Representative Office in Italy in Rome, which functions as a de facto embassy in Italy.

== History ==
Following the British Empire's defeat of China in the First Opium War (1839–1841), foreign powers required China to permit foreign missionaries. The unequal treaties gave European powers jurisdiction over missions and some authority over Chinese Christians. France sought to frame itself as the protector of Catholics in China, which in turn led to a sustained diplomatic dispute with the Holy See about who had authority over Chinese Catholics.

In 1917, the ROC and the Holy See agreed in principle to establish a diplomatic relationship. France, which had framed itself as the protector of Catholics in China since the unequal treaties and had a long-standing dispute with the Holy See as a result, blocked these diplomatic efforts. As a result, Vatican interests in China were represented by an Apostolic Delegate (which does not have formal diplomatic status) until the 1940s.

The Republic of China established relations with the Holy See in July 1942. After Xie Shoukang arrived in Rome on 26 January 1943, the legation was based in the Vatican City. After the Second World War, the legation was moved to Rome.

In 1951, the People's Republic of China expelled the Apostolic Internuncio. In 1953, the Apostolic Internuncio moved to Taipei.

In June 1959, the Republic of China Legation was upgraded to an Embassy, and the Minister Plenipotentiary became Ambassador. In August, ROC ambassador John Ching Hsiung Wu resigned as the ROC Ambassador to the Holy See. By that time, the ROC Foreign Ministry had already re-located to Taipei due to Nationalist losses in the Chinese Civil War. Wu requested that the ROC delay naming his replacement because of what he described as the delicate situation.

When the United Nations removed the ROC and recognized the PRC as China, the Holy See downgraded its diplomatic status with the ROC. As the ROC has continued to lose diplomatic recognition over time since then, its embassy to the Holy See has increased in political significance from the ROC's perspective. It is the ROC's only embassy in Europe.

In March 2005, the embassy was moved to Via della Conciliazione 4/D.

== List of Envoys to the Holy See ==
| Name | Appointed | Terminated | Note |
|---|---|---|---|
| HSIEH Shou-Kang | January 1943 | September 1946 | |
| Wu Ching-hsiung | September 1946 | July 1949 | |
| CHU Ying | July 1949 | October 1954 | as an agency |
| HSIEH Shou-Kang | October 1954 | June 1959 | then became an ambassador |

== List of Ambassadors to the Holy See ==
| Name | Appointed | Terminated | note |
|---|---|---|---|
| HSIEH Shou-Kang | June 1959 | September 1966 | |
| Shen Chang-huan | September 1966 | March 1969 | |
| Chen Chih-Mai | March 1969 | January 1978 | |
| Chow Shu-Kai | January 1978 | August 1991 | |
| HOANG Sieou-Je | August 1991 | May 1993 | |
| Edward Tzu-Yu WU | May 1993 | August 1996 | |
| Raymond R.M. TAI | September 1996 | January 2004 | |
| Chou-seng TOU | January 2004 | 15 September 2008 | |
| Larry Wang | September 2008 | December 2015 | |
| Matthew S.M. LEE | December 2015 | current | |

== See also ==
- Holy See–Taiwan relations
- List of diplomatic missions of the Republic of China
