= Larry Wang =

Taiwanese diplomat

- 王豫元
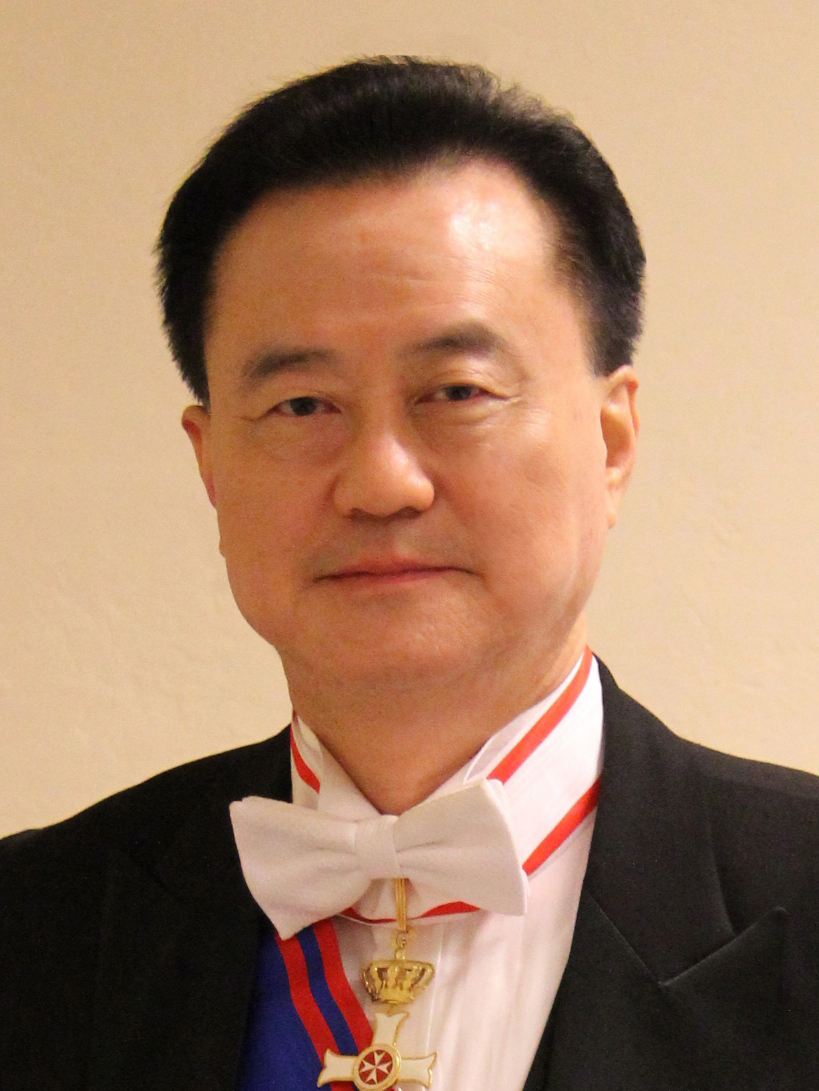

Ambassador Extraordinary and Plenipotentiary of the Republic of China to the Holy See
- In office November 2008 – December 2015
- Preceded by: Tou Chou-seng
- Succeeded by: Matthew S.M. Lee

ROC Representative to Kingdom of the Netherlands
- In office October 2006 – September 2008
- Preceded by: Katharine Chang

Personal details
- Born: 4 February 1947 (age 79)
- Party: Kuomintang
- Education: Chinese Culture University (BA, MA)

Larry Wang or Wang Yu-yuan (Chinese: 王豫元; pinyin: Wáng Yùyuán, born 1947) is a Taiwanese senior diplomat. He is a native of Wujin County, Jiangsu Province and is proficient in English and Spanish.

Wang was the 9th Ambassador Extraordinary and Plenipotentiary of the Republic of China to the Holy See. He was previously the Representative of the Taipei Representative Office in the Netherlands.

== Early life and education ==
Wang was born in Kaifeng City, Henan Province. He earned a BA degree in political science in 1970 and an MA degree in political science in 1973 from Chinese Culture University.

== Career overview ==
Before entering the diplomatic service in 1974, Wang Yu-yuan worked in the Overseas Department of the Broadcasting Corporation of China (BCC) in Taipei as English reporter and Deputy Director of the Section for international programs. He also worked for the Central Daily News in Taipei as editor and translator.

Wang began his diplomatic career in the Department of North American Affairs at Taiwan's Ministry of Foreign Affairs. He then served in various roles at the Embassy of the Republic of China in Washington from 1976 to 1979. Following the cessation of official diplomatic relations between the Republic of China and the United States, he served at the Taipei Economic and Cultural Representative Office in the United States, with a three-year interlude in Taipei, from 1979 to 1994. He returned to the Ministry of Foreign Affairs as Chief of Protocol 1994 to 1996, afterwards serving as the Representative of Taiwan in Buenos Aires from 1996 to 2003. He then directed the Department of European Affairs at the Ministry of Foreign Affairs before serving as Representative of Taiwan in The Hague and from 2006 to 2008 and Ambassador to the Holy See.

== Embassy of the Republic of China and Taipei Representative Office in Washington D.C. tenure ==
In 1976, Wang Yu-yuan, who was part of the staff of the North American Affairs Department of the Ministry of Foreign Affairs, was assigned to the Embassy of the Republic of China in Washington D.C. as Third Secretary. Initially, he worked in the political section, but in August 1978, following the transfer to Taipei of Senior Secretary Huang Chun-chien (黃純謙), Head of General Affairs Section, Ambassador James Shen promoted him to Head of the General Affairs Section. Just a few months later, on December 15, 1978, US President Jimmy Carter announced that the United States would sever its diplomatic relations with the Republic of China. Wang was placed in charge of relocating the embassy and moving everything out of Twin Oakes. He was also responsible for what he described later on to be the "saddest day of his career": the flag-lowering ceremony in Twin Oaks on December 31 of the same year. This event marked the beginning of a new chapter in the history of the Republic of China's representative offices in the United States.

In 1983, Fredrick Chien, ROC Vice Minister of Foreign Affairs, was appointed ROC Representative to Washington D.C., USA. In 1984, Chien brought Wang, then Section Chief of the Department of North American of the Ministry of Foreign Affairs, to his Representative Office to participate in the lobbying of the U.S. Congress for the interests of ROC. He kept this position for ten years. Following Chien's departure in July 1988, Ting Mao-shih succeeded Chien as Taiwan's Representative in Washington D.C.. Wang kept working for Ting until 1994. His working style seemed to be appreciated by his superiors as evidenced by the fact that his name was quoted three times by within Chien's memoirs (錢復回憶錄).

The first quotation refers to the time when the ROC decided to accept the proposal of US President Ronald Reagan to provide a secret donation to Nicaragua rebels. In August 1985, Foreign Minister Chu Fu-sung asked Wang to personally deliver an instruction to Chien, ROC Representative in Washington. (See Fredrick Chien Memoirs Volume II, page 436).

The second quotation refers to the period right before ROC President Chiang Ching-kuo's historical decision to lift martial law in 1986. In the month of July, Vice President Lee Teng-hui's Secretary Su Chih-chien (蘇志誠) asked Wang to deliver a message from Taipei to Chien, who was very doubtful about its content. However, later in September, a long-distance call from Chiang Hsiao-yung, son of Chiang Ching-kuo, confirmed to Chien that Chiang Ching-kuo had decided to accept Chien's views to lift martial law in Taiwan. (See Fredrick Chien Memoirs Volume II page 362).

In August 1987, the United States took under consideration the idea of co-producing frigates with Taiwan. Two U.S. senators from the State of Maine-George Mitchell (Democrat) and William Cohen (Republican), confided Chien through Wang their hopes that Taiwan would choose Bath Iron Works Corporation, located in the State of Maine, as future US partner of this co-production project. (See Fredrick Chien Memoirs Volume II page 492).

In 1991, Ting promoted Wang, who took over Jason Yuan's position, as Director-General of Congressional Affairs Division of ROC's representation in Washington D.C.. Wang succeeded in a very short period of time in winning the support of a large number of both members of the U.S Senate and House for the sale of F-16 fighter planes to Taiwan. The strong support and Congressional resolutions of U.S. Congress contributed to President Bush's announcement of the sale 150 F-16 fighter planes to the Republic of China on September 2, 1992.

== Ministry of Foreign Affairs Chief of Protocol tenure ==
In March 1994, as Chief of Protocol of the ROC Ministry of Foreign Affairs, Wang accompanied President Lee Teng-hui(李登輝) in his first visit to Central American countries, and South Africa. He also accompanied Vice President Lee Yuan-zu (李元簇)to his official visit to Panama and Guatemala, travelled with Premier Lien Chan(連戰) to the Dominican Republic and Panama; and joined Foreign Minister Fredrick Chien in his trip to the Caribbean countries.

== ROC Ambassador to the Holy See tenure ==
On November 8, 2008, Wang Yu-yuan presented his Letters of Credence to Pope Benedict XVI as the ninth ROC Ambassador Extraordinary and Plenipotentiary to the Holy See, (the "Vatican"). In order to take care of Catholics in mainland China and to seek dialogue with the local authorities, Vatican's bilateral relations with ROC are delicate. Since the beginning of 1971, the Vatican lowered the ranking of the "Ambassador of the Pope" or "Apostolic Nuncio" to "Chargé d'Affaires". In addition to the consolidation of diplomatic ties and to the active promotion of substantive relations, thanks to the work of Wang Yu-yuan, on May 8, 2010, the ROC Ministry of Education officially recognized the degrees issued by 23 Pontifical Universities, Academies and Institutions in Rome, thereby solving a thorny issue that lasted over several decades. The diplomas of about eight hundred members of the clergy who have studies in Pontifical institutions in the past are now recognized.

On July 12, 2011, Pope Benedict XVI bestowed upon Ambassador Wang the "Knight Grand Cross of the Order of Pope Pius IX" medal (Latin: A MAGNA CRVCE EQVITEM ORDINIS PIANI), the highest honor awarded to the ambassadors to the Holy See. The award ceremony was presided by the Chief of Protocol of the Holy See, Msgr. Fortunatus Nwachukwu, on behalf of the Pope.

On December 2, 2011, the ROC signed the first agreement with the Holy See in a seventy-year period, it was called "Agreement on the Collaboration in the Field of Higher Education and on the Recognition of Studies, Qualifications, Diplomas and Degrees." According to President Ma Ying-jeou, this agreement helps making Taiwan "a centre of higher education for East Asia." As a result, Catholic teaching will be part of the curricula of Catholic institutions. This agreement was the fruit of a year's work and saw the cooperation of the Vatican Congregation for Catholic Education, the bishops of Taiwan, Fu Jen Catholic University and other Catholic colleges. Msgr. Paul Russell, Vatican's Chargé d'Affaires in Tapei, said that "First of all, we had to find a common view among ourselves and then we worked closely with the Ministry of Education, of the Interior [which carries the portfolio on faith communities], the Foreign Ministry. We received enormous help from Taiwan's Ambassador to the Holy See, Larry Wang, and President Ma Ying-jeou." The Agreement entered into force on December 17, 2012.

On February 11, 2013, Pope Benedict XVI's announced retirement shocked the world, as a similar event last occurred 600 years earlier. The timing of Pope Benedict XVI's announcement coincided with the Lunar New Year holiday period in Taiwan. Wang Yu-yuan, without previous authorization, through negotiations and exchanging of views with the Vatican, tried for nearly a month to succeed at what was regarded as an extremely difficult task: welcoming ROC President Ma Ying-jeou to attend Pope Francis's installation ceremony. Wang finally got the Holy See to agree on his proposal. Ma Ying-jeou became the Republic of China's first President to ever attend a Pope's inauguration ceremony and the first ROC President to see the Pope. Ma Ying-jeou expressed his appreciation for Wang's effort and spoke highly of him.

== Awards and decorations ==
In October 1995, Wang Yu-Yuan was awarded the Grand Officer of the Order of Antonio José de Irisarri by the President of Guatemala; On July 3, 1996, he was awarded the "Orden Francisco Morazan" medal by the President of Honduras; On September 26, 2008, he was awarded the Order of Brilliant Star with Special Grand Cordon by ROC President Ma Ying-jeou; On July 12, 2011, he was awarded the Knight Grand Cross of the Order of Pope Pius IX by Pope Benedict XVI "(Latin: 'A Magna Crvce Eqvitem Ordinis Piani' );

On November 8, 2012, he was appointed a Grand Officer of the Order pro merito Melitensi by His Most Eminent Highness Fra' Matthew Festing, Prince and Grand Master of the Sovereign Military Hospitaller Order of Saint John of Jerusalem, of Rhodes, and of Malta for his promotion of values and works of charity in the Christian tradition as defined by the Roman Catholic Church.

== See also ==
- Embassy of the Republic of China to the Holy See
- China–Holy See relations
- Foreign relations of Taiwan
- Foreign relations of China
- Foreign relations of the Holy See
- Holy See–Taiwan relations
- Republic of China Ambassador to the Holy See (in Chinese)

Government offices
Preceded by Tou Chu-seng	The 9th Republic of China Ambassador Extraordinary and Plenipotentiary to Holy See; 2008–2015	Succeeded by Matthew S.M. Lee
