= Congregatio Discipulorum Domini =

Chinese catholic religious institute

Congregation of the Disciples of the Lord
- Congregatio Discipulorum Domini (Ecclesiastical Latin) 主徒會 (Traditional Chinese)
- Abbreviation: CDD
- Formation: 1928; 98 years ago
- Founder: Celso Costantini, CDD
- Headquarters: Xuanhua, Hebei, China
- Superior-general: John Chia CDD
- Affiliations: Catholic Church

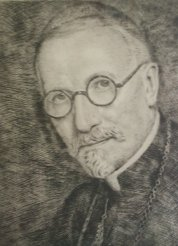
Cardinal Costantini in his later days

The Congregation of the Disciples of the Lord (Ecclesiastical Latin: Congregatio Discipulorum Domini; Traditional Chinese: 主徒會) is a Catholic religious institute founded by the Italian archbishop and future cardinal Celso Costantini in 1928 at Xuanhua (Süanhwafu) of Hebei Province in China, with the help of the Spanish Redemptorist missionaries. It is one of the first Catholic institutes to be established in Asia.

In 1949, following the Chinese civil war, the congregation was expelled and has since been based in Taiwan.

== List of superiors-general ==
The CDD elected its first superior-general in 1933:

1. John Chia (謝啟龍) (4 Jan 2011 - )
2. Francis Chong (張少麟) (27 Jan 2017 – 4 Jan 2024)
3. John Chia (謝啟龍) (25 Jan 2011 – 27 Jan 2017)
4. Stephen Ng (黃進龍) (25 Jan 1999 – 24 Jan 2011)
5. John C. Liu (劉嘉祥) (21 Nov 1988 – 25 Jan 1999)
6. John Baptist Chai (翟德馨) (1980 – 21 Nov 1988)
7. Matthew Pian (邊彤麟) (1974 – 1980)
8. Augustine Wang (王臣瑞) (16 Feb 1966 – 1974)
9. Joseph Yang (楊紹南) (1963 – 1966)
10. Joseph Kuo Joshih (郭若石), Archbishop of Taipei (1954 – 1962)
11. Joseph Yang (楊紹南) (25 Jan 1948 – 1954)
12. Joseph Kuo Joshih (郭若石), later archbishop (Jun 1937 – 25 Jan 1948)
13. Joseph Ma (馬光伯) (Jan 1937 – Jun 1937)
14. John Baptist Wu (吳耀漢) (Jul 1933 – Jan 1937)
