= Juan Campos Rodríguez =

Galician Redemptorist missionary in Asia

- Born: 11 July 1907; Pazos de Codesedo, Ourense, Galicia, Spain
- Died: 9 December 1995 (aged 88); Singapore
- Notable work: Evangelio tras la Gran Muralla: Memorias de un misionero de China

Juan Campos Rodríguez (Pazos de Codesedo, Ourense, 11 July 1907 – Singapore, 9 December 1995) was a Galician writer, translator, missionary and Catholic priest who belonged to the Redemptorist Congregation. He spent over 15 years as a missionary in Sichuan, western China, until he had to flee the country after the communist revolution. He then lived for a while in Hong Kong and Macau before settling down in Singapore, where he worked as a priest until he died at the age of 88.

== Biography ==
Juan Campos was a native of Pazos de Codesedo, a small town in Sarreaus, Ourense province. He was born in 1907.

Campos' younger brother, José Campos Rodríguez, also became a Redemptorist priest and went on a mission to Mexico. Juan joined the Congregation of the Most Holy Redeemer, a religious order founded by Saint Alphonsus Liguori in the 18th century to preach to the poor and neglected. He was ordained a priest in 1932 and sent to China as part of the Redemptorist mission.

In 1936 he arrived in China, where the Redemptorists had established their first mission in 1922, and settled in Sichuan province, where he spent most of his China years in Sichang (Apostolic Vicariate of Ningyuanfu), capital of the Nosu Country located in the southwest of the province. There he devoted himself to popular preaching, catechesis, caring for the sick and promoting local vocations. He learned the Chinese language and culture and adapted to the living conditions of the people. During World War II and the Japanese invasion, he suffered persecutions and difficulties, but he did not abandon his apostolic work.

In 1949, after the establishment of the People's Republic of China by Mao Zedong, foreign missionaries were expelled or imprisoned. Campos described the years from 1945 to 1948 as a time of "violent persecution", culminating in the "winter of blood" between 1947 and 1948. Juan Campos managed to escape to Macau and later to Hong Kong, where he continued his ministry among the Chinese refugees.

In October 1967 he moved to Singapore, where the Redemptorists had founded a new mission. There, according to the Redemptorist father Kevin J. O'Brien in his book Redemptorists in Singapore-Malaysia, "he added a breadth and an courtly sagacity to the life and folklore of the community".

Occasionally, Father Campos collaborated with the mission in Malaysia, and he got involved in the founding of a new church in Ipoh Garden. The first public Mass in this new church was held on April 9, 1972, and on April 15 Archbishop Gregory Yong inaugurated and blessed the sanctuary. The parish staff consisted of Father Wallace (pastor), Father Juan Campos (in charge of the Chinese work), and Father John Martin (in charge of the English and Tamil work).

He worked at the Church of St. Alphonsus in Singapore until his death, which occurred in December 1995, at the age of 88.

== Legacy ==
Campos became fluent in several languages. He translated The Life of St. Alphonsus, written in English by Fathers D. Miller and F.X. Aubin, into Mandarin, and also the saint's complete ascetic works. He revised The Life of St. Gerard published in Chinese in 1934 by Father José Morán Pan and translated into English the work A Popular Saint: The Life of St. Gerard by Raimundo Tellería, the three volumes of Holy Mary of Perpetual Help by Adelino María García Paz and The Poor are Evangelised: Dialogues with Alphonsus by Manuel Gómez Ríos.

During his stay in Macau, in 1955, Father Campos founded, together with Father Eusebio Arnáiz, the Anglo-Chinese School of Perpetual Help.

Juan Campos was one of the many Spanish missionaries who dedicated their lives to the evangelization of Asia. He contributed to the growth of the Catholic Church in Asia and to the human and social development of the communities where he worked. The mission in China, and his work in Macau, Hong Kong, Malaysia, Singapore, among other countries, are collected in the book Gospel behind the Great Wall: Memoirs of a Missionary in China (Evangelio tras la Gran Muralla: memorias de un misionero en China), written by Father Campos himself and published by Editorial San Pablo in 1987.

== Bibliography ==
- Campos Rodríguez, Juan (1987). Evangelio tras la Gran Muralla. Madrid: Editorial San Pablo. ISBN 978-84-285-0994-9.

== See also ==
- Catholic Church in Sichuan
- Catholic Church in Singapore
- Spanish Redemptorist missions in Sichuan
