= Chan Sui Ki (La Salle) College =

Catholic boys' secondary school in Hong Kong

- 陳瑞祺（喇沙）書院

Location
- 4 Sheung Wo Street, Ho Man Tin; Kowloon; Hong Kong; 22.319431°N 114.183462°E

Information
- Type: Government funded Anglo-Chinese Boys'
- Motto: Latin: Laus Deo Semper; English: Praise God always
- Established: 1969; 57 years ago
- Founder: Brother Herman Fenton, FSC Institute of the Brothers of the Christian Schools
- School district: Kowloon City
- Principal: Lee Po Chu, Fiona
- Grades: Secondary 1–6
- Enrollment: 1097
- Colour: Maroon
- Yearbook: Leowlish
- Affiliations: Lasallian educational institutions
- Website: www.csklsc.edu.hk

Chan Sui Ki (La Salle) College (Chinese: 陳瑞祺（喇沙）書院; abbreviated as CSK) is an English-medium Catholic boys' secondary school in Ho Man Tin, Kowloon, Hong Kong. It was established in 1969 by the Institute of the Brothers of the Christian Schools, a religious teaching order founded by St John Baptist de La Salle.

In recent years, the public examination results of Chan Sui Ki (La Salle) College have shown steady improvement. Since 2022, over 60% of students have met the admission requirements for local bachelor’s degree programs, earning the school a “Band 1” designation among Hong Kong secondary schools.

== History ==
=== La Salle College Evening School ===
The school’s origins can be traced back to the La Salle College Evening School, which was established in 1964 by Brother Herman Michael Fenton at the La Salle College site. However, due to regulations limiting night schools, the school transitioned to a full-time day school. In 1969, the evening school separated and relocated to its current Ho Man Tin campus at 4 Sheung Wo Street on September 3, 1969.

=== Foundation ===
In April 1967, the Chan family approached the Jesuits to ask if they would be interested in taking over the running of a secondary school and in moving to the new building which they intended to build in memory of their father, Mr. Chan Sui Ki, a successful merchant and once the President of the Tung Wah Group of Hospitals, a well-known charitable organization in Hong Kong. Fr. Cronin, SJ, the Jesuit Provincial Superior, was not inclined to accept the offer for his order but proposed that the offer be made to the Christian Brothers instead. Eventually, the Christian Brothers accepted the offer and transferred the existing evening school operating in La Salle College to the new building. The evening school under the supervision of Brother Herman Fenton, FSC operated from 3:00 p.m. until about 8:00 p.m. The government provided the site and an 80% subsidy. The Chan family would donate HK$500,000.

In December 1968, work began on the site. In April 1969, the foundation stone was laid by the then Director of Education, Mr. Gregg, and on 3 September the school moved into the classroom block—951 students and 34 teachers all told. All the while work on the school hall and the laboratories, library, geography, art-room, etc. and the Brothers' quarters, which unfortunately only accommodated four people, continued until December 12th, when the building authority inspected the completed building for its final occupation permit. The official blessing and opening ceremony was performed on 12 February 1970 by Rev. Father Colombo P.P. and the Hon. J. Canning, Director of Education, respectively.

The community was inaugurated on July 1, 1969, with the appointment of Brother Herman Fenton, FSC as Director and Brother Eugene Sharkey, FSC as a teacher. Later they were joined by Brothers Curran Cronan, FSC and Paul Hackett, FSC Until the Brothers quarters were ready, the community continued to reside in La Salle College.

=== Dedication ===
The school was named by the descendants of Mr. Chan Sui Ki after him. The Chan family had put up more than twenty free schools in Hong Kong and Macau, Canton, Foshan and elsewhere in memory of their father, Chan Sui Ki.

In 1936, Chan received the "Golden Dragon" medal from the Vietnamese Government in recognition of the help he had given during their troublesome times. On several occasions he sent donations to Northern China, Canton and Hong Kong and for years, he distributed free rice to the needy of Macau.

== List of Principals ==
Term	Principals
1969-1970	Rev. Bro. Herman Michael Fenton
1970-1991	Rev. Bro. Eugene Sharkey
1991-1995	Rev. Bro. Thomas Blake Lawrence
1995-2005	Mr. Lee Bing Keung
2005-2010	Mr. Sze Kin Kwan
2010-2024	Mr. Lee Ting-leung
2024-present	Ms. Lee Po Chu, Fiona (李寶珠女士)

== Campus ==
The campus is located at 4 Sheung Wo Street, Ho Man Tin, Kowloon, Hong Kong, spanning approximately 5,000 square metres. The campus includes 30 air-conditioned classrooms, a library, laboratories for physics, chemistry, biology, and integrated science, and specialized rooms for music, visual arts, computer studies, and religious studies. Outdoor facilities comprise an open playground, a covered playground, and a school hall, while a canteen provides hot meals.

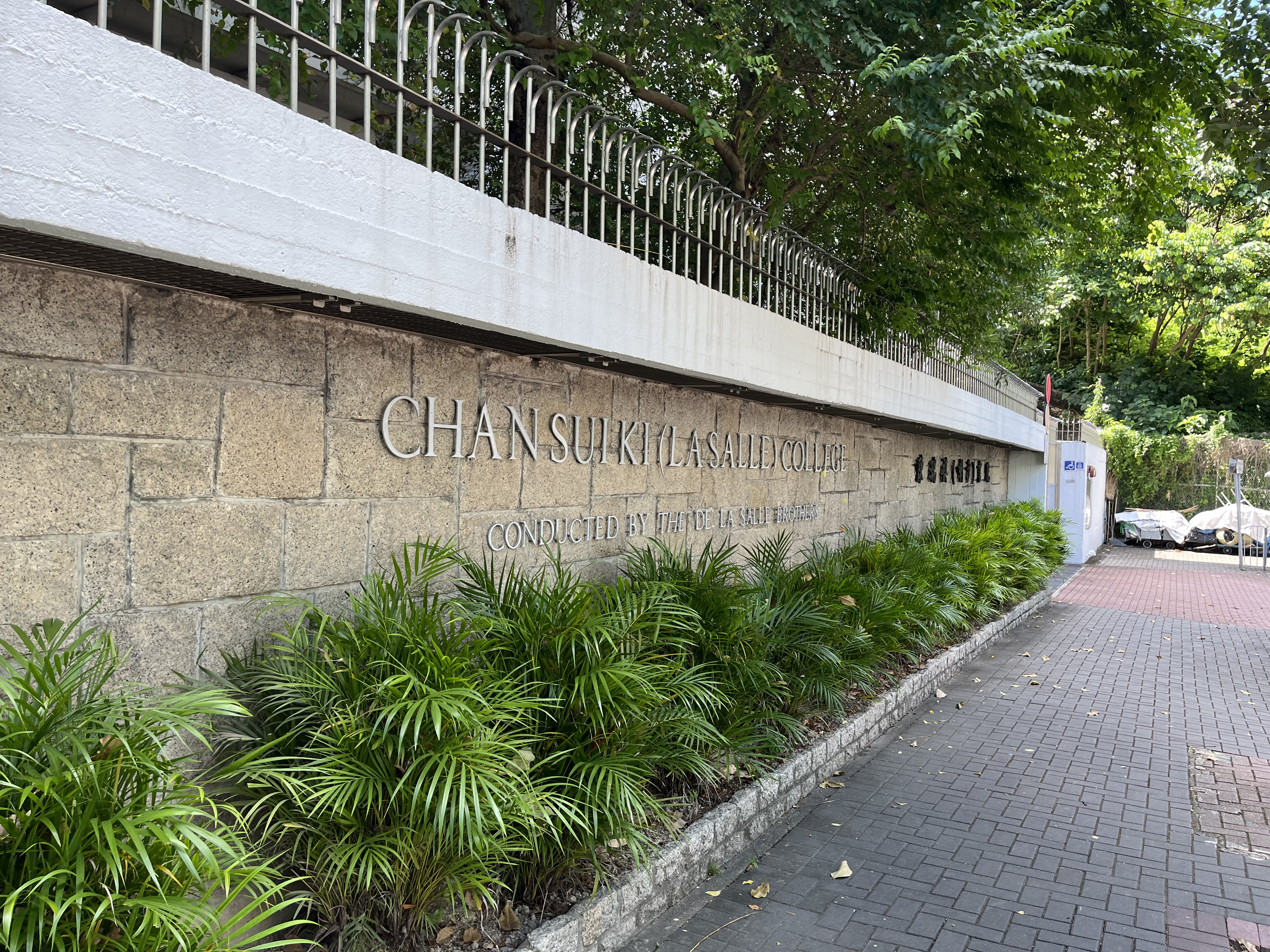
Facade signage of the school on a brick wall.

All students from S1 to S6 are permitted to leave campus for lunch. Accessibility features include an accessible lift and toilet for students with special needs.

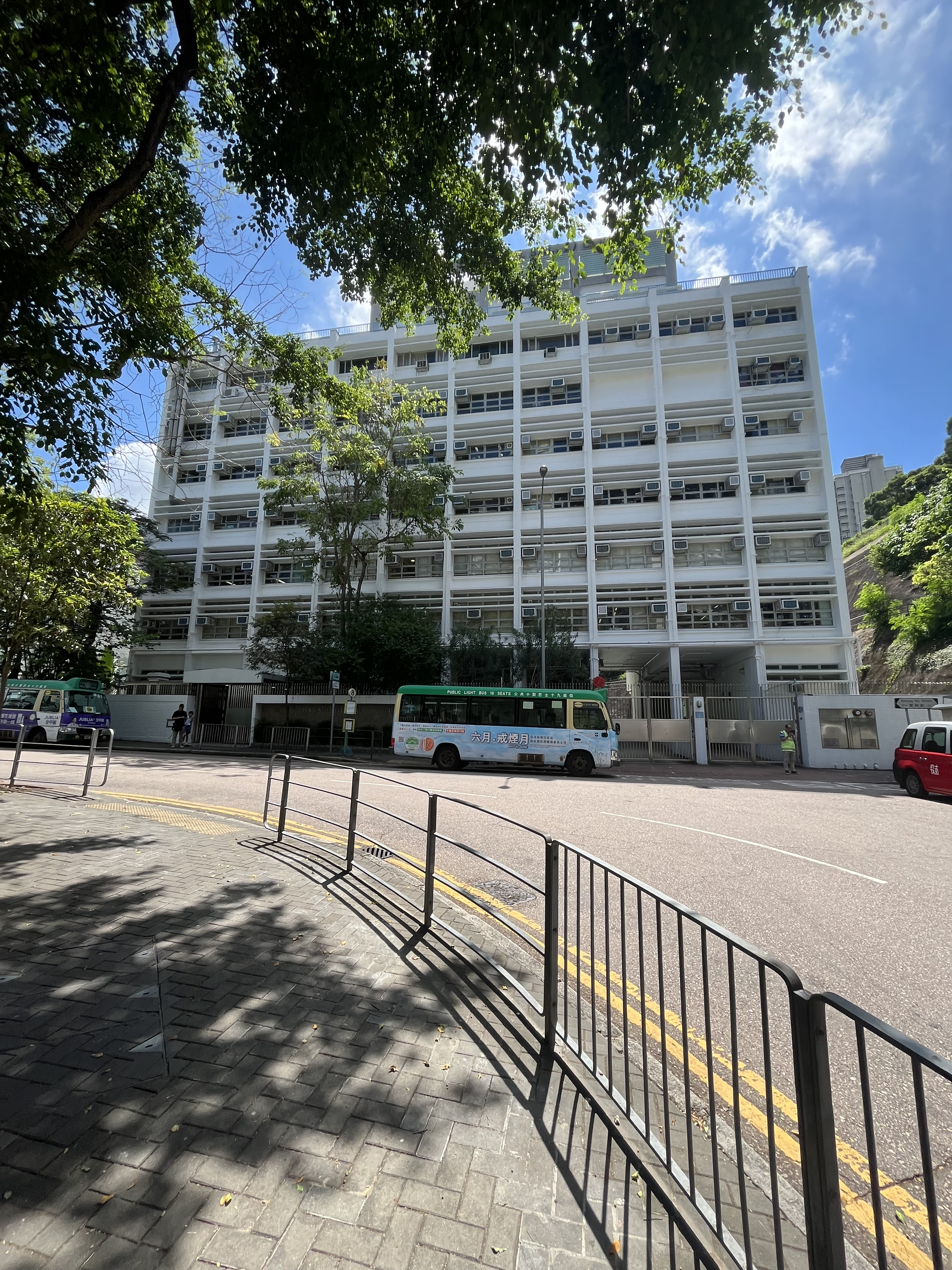
View of the school building.

== Curriculum ==
The school provides education from Form 1 to Form 6 under the Hong Kong Diploma of Secondary Education system. English is the medium of instruction for most subjects, except Chinese Language, Chinese History, Putonghua (Forms 1–3), Citizenship and Social Development (Forms 4–6), and Health Management and Social Care (Forms 4–6). Assemblies and major events are conducted in English.

Subjects offered include:

Forms 1–3: English Language, Chinese Language, Mathematics, Integrated Science, STEAM (Form 2), Citizenship, Economics and Society, Geography and History, Religious Studies, Computer Literacy, Music, Physical Education, Visual Arts, Business Fundamentals (Form 3), Putonghua, Chinese History.

Forms 4–6: English Language, Chinese Language, Mathematics, Citizenship and Social Development, Physical Education, Religious Studies. Electives include Biology, Chemistry, Physics, Chinese History, Economics, Geography, Business, Accounting and Financial Studies, Information and Communication Technology, Health Management and Social Care, Music, Visual Arts, and Mathematics Extended Part Module 2 (Algebra and Calculus). Students select electives in Form 4, and choosing at least 3 subjects are required.

Unlike most Hong Kong schools, CSK is notable for not having a house system. Instead, it focuses on inter-class competitions for sports and cultural events.

The school provides support for non-Chinese speaking (NCS) students through tailored pull-out classes for Chinese-related subjects, which are conducted in the school library.

At the junior secondary level, a split-class mode is selectively implemented for Chinese, English and Maths lessons based on students' language or arithmetic proficiency.

== Extracurricular Activities ==
=== Interest clubs and societies ===
Extracurricular activities are offered to students from Secondary 1 to Secondary 6, including nine school teams, two uniform groups, seven instrumental classes, and around 25 clubs and societies. The clubs and societies include academic, religious, service, art, and interest groups, such as the Aerospace Society and Astronomy Club, allowing students to pursue diverse interests.

==== Debate ====
The English Debate Team is divided into Junior and Senior divisions. They participate in the annual Hong Kong Secondary Schools Debating Competition (HKSSDC) and the Sing Tao Inter-School Debating Competition, and regularly place in the final rounds of both competitions. Notably, the junior team secured a first-round victory against Maryknoll Convent School in the 2025-2026 season, and managed to win the Term 2 Kowloon Junior Division 1 Championship.

Since 2026, the school has held the George Hong Cup, an annual inter-class debating competition for both junior and senior secondary students. Established to foster critical thinking and language proficiency, the cup is named in honor of former Vice-Principal George Hong Po-chuen. The event was founded through a donation by alumnus Simon Wong, a Deputy District Judge. The competition is held in both Chinese and English formats.

The Chinese Debate Team does not use a divisional structure, welcoming students from all forms to participate together. They participate in the annual Sing Tao Inter-School Debating Competition, Joint School Chinese Debating Competition, alongside various territory-wide tournaments. Notably, the team secured the champion ship title at the Hok Sze Cup in 2024, as well as the 1st Hong Kong Secondary Schools Re-unification Cup Debating Competition in late 2025.

=== Student Association ===
The Student Association (SA) is the primary student representative body. The elected cabinet for the 2026-2027 academic year is Altiora. It coordinates school-wide events and oversees the various interest clubs.

=== Sports Achievements ===
The school actively participates in inter-school competitions, particularly in athletics, cross-country, badminton, and football.

The Bank of China (Hong Kong) Bauhinia Bowl, formerly known as the Omega Rose Bowl, presents trophies to schools that demonstrate exceptional all-round performance in sports organized by the Regional Committee.

The school’s boys’ teams achieved the following:

- 1973–1974: Most Progressive Award
- 1980–1981: Second Place and Most Progressive Award
- 1989–1990: Most Progressive Award
- 2004–2005: Most Progressive Award
- 2008–2009: 10th place
- 2009–2010: 12th place
- 2010–2011: 10th place
- 2011–2012: 9th place
- 2012–2013: 9th place
- 1990–1991: Outstanding Athlete Award – To Sze Wai

== Notable alumni ==
- Albert Leung, (林夕), lyricist and writer known for thousands of Cantopop songs (e.g. for Leslie Cheung, Faye Wong, Eason Chan)
- Ellesmere Choi, (蔡子健), former Hong Kong TVB actor
- Michael Mak Kwok-fung, (麥國風), former member of Legislative Council (LegCo); founding deputy chairman of the League of Social Democrats

== See also ==
- Institute of the Brothers of the Christian Schools
- Lasallian educational institutions
- Education in Hong Kong
- List of schools in Hong Kong
- Chan Sui Ki Perpetual Help College
