= Antonio Riberi =

Catholic cardinal and apostolic nuncio

His Eminence Antonio Riberi
- Apostolic Nuncio Emeritus to Spain
- Church: Roman Catholic Church
- Appointed: 28 April 1962
- Term ended: 26 June 1967
- Predecessor: Ildebrando Antoniutti
- Successor: Luigi Dadaglio
- Other post: Cardinal-Priest of San Girolamo della Carità pro hac vice (1967)
- Previous posts: Apostolic Delegate to Eastern Africa (1934–45); Titular Archbishop of Dara (1934–67); Apostolic Internuncio to China (1946–59); Apostolic Nunciature to Ireland (1959–62)

Orders
- Ordination: 29 June 1922 by Giuseppe Castelli
- Consecration: 28 October 1934 by Pietro Fumasoni Biondi
- Created cardinal: 26 June 1967 by Pope Paul VI
- Rank: Cardinal-Priest

Personal details
- Born: Antonio Riberi; 15 June 1897 Montecarlo, Monaco
- Died: 16 December 1967 (aged 70) Rome, Italy
- Education: Pontifical Gregorian University; Pontifical Ecclesiastical Academy
- Motto: Sicut rivus aquarium in site
- Coat of arms

Styles of Antonio Riberi
- Reference style: His Eminence
- Spoken style: Your Eminence
- Religious style: Monsignor
- Informal style: Cardinal

Antonio Riberi (15 June 1897 – 16 December 1967) was a Monegasque prelate of the Catholic Church. He served as the fifth apostolic nuncio to Ireland and later as the nuncio to Spain from 1962 until his death. He was elevated to the cardinalate in 1967.

== Biography ==
Born in Monte Carlo, Riberi studied at the seminary in Cuneo, Italy, and the Pontifical Gregorian University and Pontifical Ecclesiastical Academy in Rome, where he was ordained to the priesthood on 29 June 1922. He then furthered his studies until 1925 at the Institute of Social Sciences in Bergamo. From 1925 to 1930, Riberi served as attaché and secretary of the Bolivian nunciature. He was raised to the rank of an honorary chamberlain of his holiness on 1 May 1925, and made counselor of the nunciature to Ireland in 1930.

On 13 August 1934, Riberi was appointed titular archbishop of Dara. He received his episcopal consecration on the following 28 October from Cardinal Pietro Fumasoni Biondi, with Archbishops Giuseppe Pizzardo and Carlo Salotti serving as co-consecrators. Riberi was later named nuncio to the African missions dependent of the Sacred Congregation for the Propagation of the Faith on 4 November of that same year. During this time, he resided in Mombasa, Kenya. Archbishop Riberi, from 1939 to 1946, headed the Vatican's assistance service for the prisoners of war and wounded soldiers of the Second World War.

Riberi arrived in China in 1942.

In summer 1949, during the Chinese Civil War, the Communist forces captured the Nationalist capital, Nanjing. The Nationalist government of China retreated to Guangzhou. Although most of the diplomatic corps in Nanjing also went to Guangzhou, Riberi remained in Nanjing.

In 1950, the Holy See stated that participation in certain Communist Party-related organizations would result in excommunication from the Church. In response, initiatives including Fr. Wang Liangzuo's "Guangyuan Declaration of Catholic Self-Reformation" gained support from Chinese Catholics. Riberi in turn denounced these initiatives. Riberi declared in 1951, following petitions (from the Chinese Communist Party) for an independent Catholic Church in that country, that "the Catholic religion ... is superpolitical, indivisible by national boundaries or political differences ... Any so-called Independent Catholic Church ... is simply a schismatic church and not the true and one Catholic Church".

Chinese authorities arrested Riberi on allegations of colluding with American intelligence and false accusations of participating in a plot to kill Mao Zedong. Under police guard, Riberi was deported to British Hong Kong. Riberi stayed in Hong Kong for two years, and after lobbying from the Republic of China (ROC), Bishop Yu Bin, and Cardinal Francis Spellman, moved his nunciature to Taipei.

Riberi became nuncio to Ireland on 19 February 1959, and to Spain on 28 April 1962. From 1962 to 1965, he attended the Second Vatican Council.

He was created cardinal-priest of San Girolamo della Carità by Pope Paul VI in the consistory of 26 June 1967, but died some months later in Rome, at age 70. Cardinal Riberi is buried in his family's tomb in Limone Piemonte.

Catholic Church titles
Preceded by Mario Zanin	Nuncio to China; 1949–1958	Succeeded by Giuseppe Caprio
Preceded by Albert Levame	Nuncio to Ireland; 1959–1962	Succeeded by Giuseppe Sensi
Preceded by Ildebrando Antoniutti	Apostolic Nuncio to Spain; 1962–1967	Succeeded by Luigi Dadaglio
