= Spanish Redemptorist missions in Sichuan =

Spanish Redemptorist Mission in Sichuan
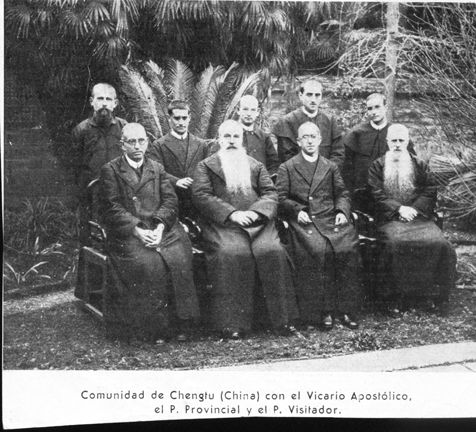
- Spanish Redemptorist community of Chengdu, capital of Sichuan, with Jacques Rouchouse, then the Apostolic Vicar of Chengtu.
- Formation: 1928 (98 years ago); Mission in Sichuan started in 1934 (92 years ago)
- Founded at: Restoration Spain
- Dissolved: 1952 (74 years ago)
- Type: Catholic mission
- Legal status: Missionary organization
- Purpose: Evangelism
- Location(s): Chengdu and Xichang, Republican China
- Region served: Western and southwestern Sichuan
- Official language: Spanish; Sichuanese
- Parent organization: Congregation of the Most Holy Redeemer
- Affiliations: Catholic Church

The Spanish Redemptorist missions in Sichuan were Catholic missions carried out by Spanish missionaries of the Congregation of the Most Holy Redeemer (Redemptorists) between 1934 and 1952 in Sichuan (formerly romanised as Szechuan), a province located in southwestern China. The Mission of Sichuan was the first permanent foundation of the Redemptorists in that country, whose missionary area was in the apostolic vicariates of Chengtu and Ningyüanfu.

== Background ==
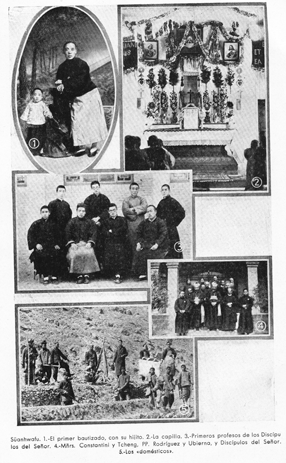
Spanish Redemptorist mission in the Apostolic Vicariate of Süanhwafu

In the 1920s, Pope Pius XI invited the Redemptorists to help Celso Costantini with the founding of the Congregation of the Disciples of the Lord for the Apostolic Vicariate of Süanhwafu (now Diocese of Xuanhua) in Hebei province. The charge was entrusted to the Redemptorist Province of Spain (Provincia Española de la Congregación del Santísimo Redentor), and consequently, a missionary group formed by Segundo Miguel Rodríguez, José Morán Pan and Segundo Velasco Arina started their trip to north China in February 1928, and arrived in Beijing on 9 April 1928.

After helping the Disciples of the Lord, they began their own apostolate. They were assigned to the mission of Xiping (Siping), a county in Henan province located in north-central China. There they suffered from horrible living conditions, with the death in successive days of two friars. Upon the death of Segundo Velasco, the Valencian priest Vicente Belenguer Esteban requested to join the mission. They made five hundred converts during the five years of their stay.

From Xiping Vicente Belenguer and another member of the community were sent to Guangzhou, or Canton as it was known at the time, in south China. They established themselves on a small island in the French concession of Guangzhou, which they dubbed "the paradise island of Shamean". However, this did not last long. In 1932, after only two years, the two fathers were ordered to return to the discomforts of Xiping from their "earthly paradise".

== Mission in Sichuan ==
=== First years ===
The problems of Xiping ended in 1934, when the Redemptorists found a new home in the remote southwestern province of Sichuan. There they had some relief from the bitter cold of the northern winter and were now in a region where Christians were more numerous. In addition, they had a comfortable residence in Sheep Market Alley (Note: Sheep Market Alley or Yangshi Alley (Chinese: 羊市巷; pinyin: Yángshì xiàng; Sichuanese romanization: Iang^{2} Shï^{4} Hang^{4})) in the capital city of Chengdu, where the Apostolic Vicar of Chengtu, Jacques Rouchouse, was stationed. The first permanent foundation of the Redemptorists was established on 24 April 1934, in the capital.

In their new home the missionaries expected a more satisfying apostolate, as evident in the expressions of enthusiasm in the letters to their provincial, José Machiñena. They were edified by the devotion and piety of the local Christians, who were in the church on Sundays at any time as long as it was open. It was a surprise to find the children well instructed, a tribute to their clergy and their parents. The first missions were successful in terms of attendance, and the preachers were gratified by the displays of fervour. The missions followed the style used in Europe with few special issues that demanded the attention of the preachers. Fathers Vicente Belenguer Esteban and Eusebio Arnáiz Álvarez felt edified by the men who insisted on handing over their pipes and opium to the priests in the confessional.

This was the pattern of Christian life in Chengdu that continued until the missionaries were expelled from the country. At the end of 1934, the community had a satisfactory mission record to report for the year. During that half-year period they had delivered twenty-four sermons and thirteen retreats to clergy, religious, seminarians, and others.

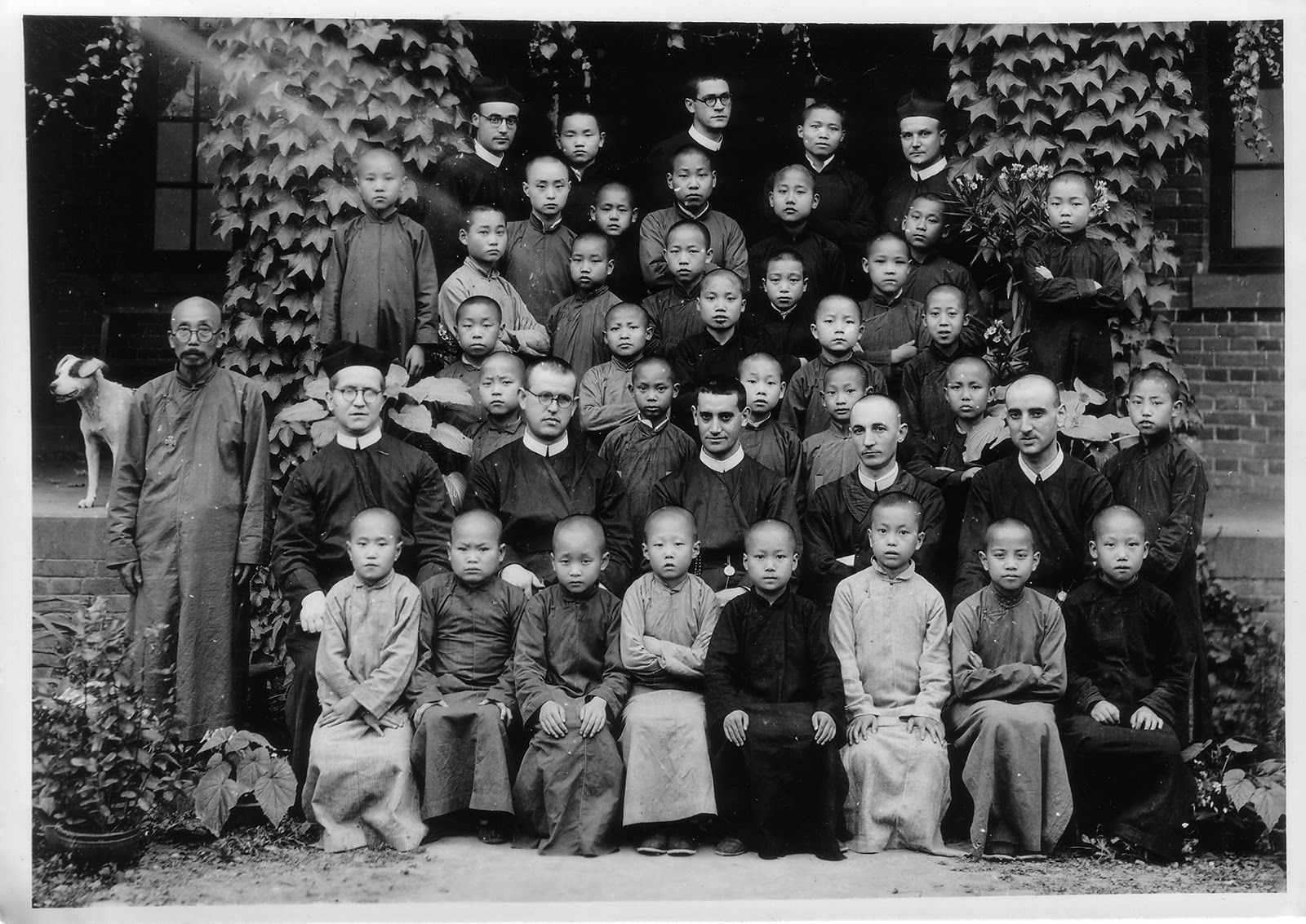
Redemptorist missionaries with a group of jovenistas, in Xiping, Henan or Chengdu, Sichuan?

Motivated by the optimism of the Chengdu community, a juvenate (i.e., minor seminary) was opened in September 1935. The name derives from the Latin juventus meaning "youth". Upon its opening, there were already thirteen young Redemptorists, or jovenistas as what the Spanish Redemptorists call the minor seminarians. Two of the jovenistas came from families long established in the Catholic faith. The lads were under the care of Father José Pedrero, who had two assistants, Eusebio Arnáiz Álvarez and Juan Campos Rodríguez, both were young missionaries at the time.

In 1938, the volume of work increased following the establishment of the second foundation in Xichang (Sichang, a.k.a. Ningyüanfu), capital of the Nosu Country in southwestern Sichuan, where the Catholics were under the jurisdiction of Stanislas Baudry, Apostolic Vicar of Ningyüanfu. This region is located further west, and it shares a border with eastern Tibet. Samuel J. Boland wrote in Spicilegium Historicum Congregationis SSmi Redemptoris that "Sichang was especially dear to Father Campos (Juan Campos), who spent most of his China years there. He was moved to become even a trifle ecstatic whenever he wrote of it".

=== Vice-Province of China ===
The two foundations in Sichuan became the Redemptorist Vice-Province of China, with Father José Pedrero as superior. While the house of Xichang began to take charge of preparing candidates for the priesthood. To carry the plan into effect, two theology students were sent to the mission from Spain. One of them was José Campos Rodríguez, younger brother of Juan Campos.

The Second Sino-Japanese War (1937–1945) did not take long to affect the Redemptorist communities. Communication with superiors in Europe became almost impossible, causing some anxiety in Spain, where only fragments of information arrived sporadically in the few letters that did arrive. In 1942, Father Pedrero reported on the state of the vice-province through Horace James Seymour, the British ambassador in Chongqing (Chungking). Chengdu was a particular target of Japanese bombs, and occasionally the bombs fell near the Redemptorist house. One night in 1941, the death toll in the city was estimated at 12,000. Jacques Rouchouse, the apostolic vicar, closed both the major seminary and the minor seminary of the Paris Foreign Missions Society. The juvenates in Chengdu and Xichang had to be disbanded in these circumstances. After the Americans entered the war, bombings became less frequent and less devastating.

During this time, Eusebio Arnáiz (anglicised as Eusebius Arnaiz) came into contact with Audrey Donnithorne, daughter of the evangelical Anglican missionary Vyvyan Donnithorne, who was stationed at the Gospel Church of Guanghan. She was dissatisfied with the Protestant religious life on the campus of West China Union University. In 1942, Arnáiz visited Donnithorne on the campus and lent her some books. The next year she converted to Catholicism. Her baptism took place at Immaculate Conception Cathedral, Chengdu.

The years after World War II saw China gripped by the further turmoil of the civil war between the nationalists and the communists. In the early years of the conflict, as the communists tightened their control over the north, the country experienced a terror. Juan Campos describes the years 1945 to 1948 as a time of "violent persecution", culminating in the "winter of blood" between 1947 and 1948. Towards mid-1948 there was some relief from the savagery, as the communists became more "tolerant", as Father Campos puts it. According to Samuel J. Boland, "perhaps it is too charitable to speak of the Maoist regime as a time of toleration. In particular, the new China was far from kindly towards the Church." Father Manuel Cid Riesco abandoned the mission in 1947 due to communist persecution. He went to Mexico, then to Guatemala, and in 1955 he was appointed vice-provincial of Central America.

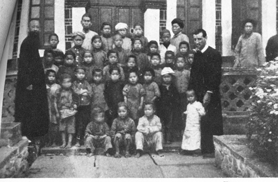
Manuel Gil de Sagredo with some children from catechism class.

It was around this time that Manuel Gil de Sagredo Arribas was appointed vice-provincial of the Redemptorists. He was sent to the mission shortly after his ordination in 1930, at the age of 22. After a year in England to learn English he arrived in Xiping in 1931, where he went through the harsh initiation and then passed to Chengdu in November 1933. In the Sichuanese capital, he was put in charge of the novices and became consultor to the then vice-provincial Father Pedrero, besides the regular missionary work. In the spring of 1934 he participated in several regional missionary campaigns together with Manuel Cid, with the Alphonsian-missionary method. Father Sagredo wrote about the dilemma of how to consolidate the presence of the Redemptorists in China around 1940, shortly before his return to Spain in 1941. He founded the laywomen's association of Marías del Redentor in the Shrine of Our Lady of Perpetual Help, Granada to support the mission in Sichuan, and carried out dissemination throughout Spain to make known the mission. On 17 December 1948, Sagredo went back to Chengdu, not yet in the hands of the communists.

A short-lived Beijing community, the third Redemptorist house after Chengdu and Xichang, existed between 1947 and 1948. Chengdu and Xichang were able to continue after the closure of the Beijing house at the end of November 1948. Father Campos wrote about the vitality of the missionaries in Chengdu during the year 1949. He was invited by the vice-provincial, Father Sagredo, to visit the community and while there he joined the latter in a mission on the outskirts of the city. The results of the mission were reported as "excellent". By then, however, many religious had left Chengdu, as the communist threat intensified. In time, the Redemptorist communities of Chengdu and Xichang were to in turn succumb to the communist regime.

=== End of the Mission of Sichuan ===
The communist army appeared in Sichuan in 1950, promising a new and happier era, that the terror of the "winter of blood" belonged to the past. The first months were deceptively peaceful, until 1951. At that time, with Father Sagredo there were two other missionaries, Alfredo Fuentes and Francisco Campano. Sagredo had become a target of resentment among the communists because of his preaching in the Redemptorist chapel to encourage the faithful to remain steadfast in the trials that would soon come. Father Fuentes was sentenced to immediate deportation. The other two had been jailed for five months before they too were expelled.

In prison, Father Sagredo wrote down his reflections in the form of meditations according to the style of Saint Alphonsus Liguori. For Father Campano the incarceration had been harsher because of what could have been seen as aggressiveness in his outbursts during interrogation. He was subjected to the most unpleasant experiences, such as in a session in 1951 in which he was picked. An apostate woman was brought in and she fiercely attacked him as unfit to be a priest, not even to be considered human but as an animal or even a monster. "This man is not fit to remain among us", she concluded, "and the Christian community of Chengtu ask the government to drive him out for the good of Christianity".

On 24 October, their incarceration ended after a trial in the prison yard. The next day they were sentenced to deportation and the two missionaries started the sixteen-day journey to Hong Kong. They reached their destination on 9 November, when, as Father Juan Campos puts it, "they breathed the air of freedom in the British colony of Hong Kong". In September 1955, Juan Campos and Eusebio Arnáiz founded the Anglo-Chinese School of Perpetual Help (now Chan Sui Ki Perpetual Help College) in Portuguese Macau. José Campos, younger brother of Juan Campos, continued his apostolate in Mexico since 1951 after the end of the Sichuan Mission.

Also in 1951, the funeral service for Joche Albert Ly was held at the small Spanish Redemptorist chapel in Xichang. Ly was superior of the Marist Brothers of Xichang. He was shot by communists after three months of incarceration under inhuman torture. His biography was written by Father Eusebio Arnáiz.

Father Segundo Miguel Rodríguez, one of the original members, could well be considered the patriarch of the mission. After Xiping, he continued missionary work in the houses of Sichuan. With him was Father José Miguélez, who had also been one of the pioneers of Xiping. They were not incarcerated nor did they suffer any harsh treatment, but they were left homeless after their house being confiscated. The situation remained so for some months until early 1952, when they were given permission to leave the country. They left with a group of sisters of the Franciscan Missionaries of Mary. They set foot on Hong Kong soil by way of the Lo Wu International Bridge after a three-week journey. Father Rodríguez, with reluctance, was the last one to cross the border.

On 6 May 1952, the first Chinese Redemptorist priest, Father Matthias, took his religious vows together with the cleric Peter Mi.

== See also ==
- Catholic Church in Spain
- Catholic Church in Tibet
- St. Anne's Church, Mosimien
