= Chan Sui Ki Perpetual Help College =

School in Macau

- Colégio Perpétuo Socorro; Chan Sui Ki 陳瑞祺永援中學
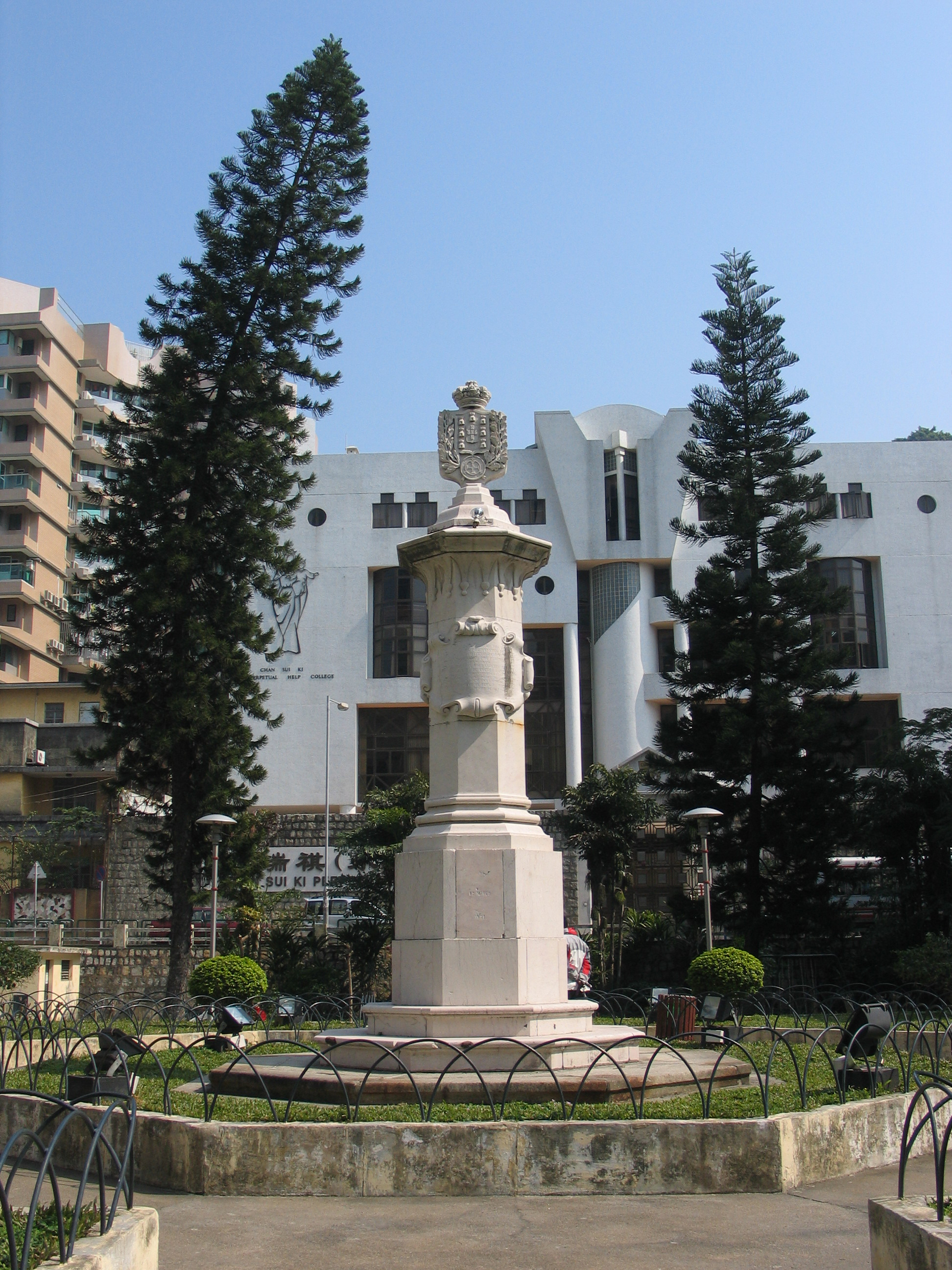
- Victory Garden with the Perpetual Help College (white building) in the background

Location
- 28, Estrada da Vitoria; Macau

Information
- School type: Grant-in-aid, Primary, Secondary
- Motto: JUCUNDITAS AC SERVITIUM
- Religious affiliation: Roman Catholic
- Established: 1955
- Founders: Juan Campos Rodríguez; Eusebio Arnáiz Álvarez
- Status: Open
- School code: CSKPHC / PHC
- Director: Sr. Flora Chu
- Principal: Sr. Margaret Cheung
- Gender: Male/Female
- Education system: English Section: GCE/IGCSE; Chinese Section:
- Campus size: 5350 sq. m.
- Affiliation: Salesian Sisters of Don Bosco
- Website: cskphc.edu.mo

Chan Sui Ki Perpetual Help College

Chinese name
- Traditional Chinese: 陳瑞祺永援中學
- Simplified Chinese: 陈瑞祺永援中学
Transcriptions
Standard Mandarin
- Hanyu Pinyin: Chén Ruìqí Yǒngyuán Zhōngxué
Yue: Cantonese
- Jyutping: can4 seoi6 kei4 wing5 wun4/jyun4 zung1 hok6

Portuguese name
- Portuguese: Colégio Perpétuo Socorro Chan Sui Ki

Chan Sui Ki Perpetual Help College (Chinese: 陳瑞祺永援中學, Portuguese: Colégio Perpétuo Socorro Chan Sui Ki; abbreviated as: Perpetual Help College; init: PHC) is a private Grant-in-aid primary and secondary school in Macau, with a main campus in São Lázaro (Saint Lazarus Parish) and a branch campus in Santo António (Saint Anthony Parish). Founded in 1955, Perpetual Help College now serves approximately 1,600 students in P.1 to F.6 (equivalent to grade one to twelve). It is a member of the Macau Catholic Schools Association.

The school has been registered as an Edexcel school, providing education opportunities on GCE A Level/ International Advanced Level to its students in the high school. Graduates of the high school receive offers from prestigious universities worldwide, including University of Cambridge, University of Edinburgh, UC Berkeley, UCLA, UCL, King's College London, University of Pennsylvania, University of Hong Kong, Chinese University of Hong Kong, University of Melbourne and many others.

== History ==
The Perpetual Help Anglo Chinese School was founded in September 1955 by two Spanish Redemptorist Fathers - Juan Campos Rodríguez and Eusebio Arnáiz Álvarez at Estrada da Vitoria, 28.

The Kindergarten and Primary School started with few pupils only. Two years later, registrations increased and six more classes were built; other classes were added in 1962. In 1964 another new building was constructed. This was blessed by Cardinal Don Jose da Costa Nunes, with the assistance of several bishops including Mgr. Caprio Apostolic Internuntius of Taiwan, on 9 December 1964.

In September 1964, the Secondary School was introduced for boys and the following year it was opened to girls too. In 1966, the school bought an adjacent house, but the Redemptorist Fathers left Macau in June 1967.

The school was taken in 1967 by the Society of Divine Love: a feminine institute founded in Macau by Fr. Eugenio Isamar (S.J.). The school's name was "Perpetual Help College".

In January, 1976 the Daughters of Mary Help of Christians became the owner of the college. It was named Daughters of Mary Help of Christians Perpetual Help College

In 1986, Mr. Chan King Luen gave a donation to construct two new buildings for the school in memory of his father Chan Sui Ki. Since then, the school was named Chan Sui Ki Perpetual Help College.

In 1990, the Kindergarten Section moved to Travessa Dos Bombeiros, 9/G., under the name of Wing Wah School. In 1992, the school's name was changed to Chan Sui Ki Perpetual Help College (Suc.).

== Campus ==
Its main campus is in São Lázaro. Its branch campus is in Santo António, and serves preschool and primary school.

The main campus sits on 5350 m^{2} in Macau, consists of three main buildings in the school - the A, B and C building. There are some thirty classrooms, three laboratories, audio-visual room, creative design room, multifunction room, and three music rooms. The school also has a chapel, art room, library, two computer rooms, and indoor sports room.

== Notable alumni and staff ==
- Edmund Ho (Chief Executive of Macau)
- Cheong Wai Leong (Violist)
- Fr Juan Campos Rodríguez (Headmaster, Founder)

== See also ==
- Chan Sui Ki (La Salle) College
- Yuet Wah College
- Spanish Redemptorist missions in Sichuan
