= Joche Albert Ly =

Chinese Marist Brother

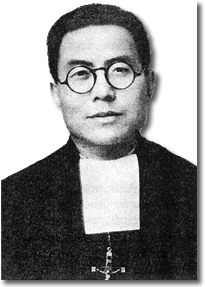

Personal life
- Born: 8 February 1910 Hejian, Hebei, Qing dynasty
- Died: 21 April 1951 (aged 41) Xichang, Sichuan, China
- Education: Fu Jen Catholic University
- Other name: Andrew Ly

Religious life
- Religion: Catholic
- Order: Marist Brothers
- Founder of: Ming Teh Secondary School

Brother Joche Albert Ly (8 February 1910 – 21 April 1951), also known as Andrew Ly, was a Chinese Marist Brother born in Hejian (Hokienfu), Hebei, and was martyred in Xichang (Sichang), Sichuan, China by members of the People's Liberation Army (PLA) for denouncing Communism.

== Early life and Brotherhood ==
Joche Albert was born to a Christian family, and upon baptism was given the name "Andrew". He entered the Marist Brothers juniorate in Beijing in 1921. He went on to make his first vows in 1931, and his perpetual profession in 1935, whereupon he took the name Joche Albert. Then, from 1940 to 1944, he studied at Fu Jen Catholic University, where he was a keen student of Chinese literature, while in his free time he would study both French and English until he mastered them both.

== Living under the PLA ==
He then moved to Yantai (Chefoo), where he enjoyed teaching Science until the PLA conquered that city, forcing him to study Marxism in the makeshift university of Laiyang. In March 1946 he fled Che Foo, and subsequently found himself permanently on the move, not only protecting himself, but also working hard, far and wide to ensure the safety and the strength of the many Catholic communities in the increasingly oppressive state. He moved to Qingdao, then to Shanghai, before moving to Shandong in Drongpa County, Tibet, and founding Ming Teh Secondary School there. But in February 1949, he returned to Shanghai, then travelled to Chongqing, and moved again to Xichang, where he was assigned as the superior.

== Oppression and martyrdom ==
As the Superior at Xichang (a.k.a. Ningyuan), Brother Joche became a key player for the Church in the region. He often found himself the spokesperson on behalf of the Diocese of Ningyuan, making him a target as he increasingly became the public face of the Church. As the director of the Catholic College of Zhejiang, he often denounced the actions of the PLA and the teachings of Communism in general. However, after the "Liberation" of Xichang, on Passion Sunday, 26 March 1950, and his re-education with many colleagues, he found his criticism had to be less marked, although he was adamant and unashamed when it came to defending God or the faith.

On 14 December 1950, Brother Albert was called to court together with another Marist Brother and the lay leader of the local Catholic Action. The interview was an attempt to get these influential leaders to profess subscription to the Three Autonomies (Catholic Patriotic Association), that they may become assets in the process of winning Catholic people over to Communism. Brother Albert categorically refused, and so was incarcerated on 6 January 1951 for "conspiracy" against the state. He spent more than 3 months in prison, under inhuman torture.

Brother Albert maintained his hardy faith despite his circumstances. While being imprisoned, Brother Albert still maintained his generosity. A Protestant person released from prison told of how he shared everything he had, including his habit. Also whilst in jail, he was still allowed to receive Holy Communion, and had indicated to his friends and supporters on the outside that he would think closely of them during the morning Angelus. On the morning of 21 April 1951, Brother Joche-Albert Ly was executed by the PLA, together with another 24 Christians, near the ramparts of Xichang. The bells of the Angelus were ringing as the shots rang out. A private burial was held for him followed by a funeral service at the small Spanish Redemptorist chapel.

== See also ==
- Chinese Martyrs
- Christianity in Hebei
- Catholic Church in Sichuan
- Catholic Church in Tibet
