= Stefano Mazzotti =

Diplomats of the holy see

Monsignor Stefano Mazzotti 馬德範
- Pro-Chargé d’affaires of Apostolic Nunciature to China
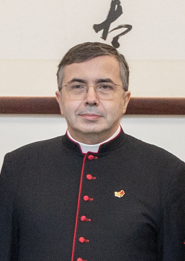
- Church: Catholic Church; Latin Church
- Appointed: 19 July 2022
- Predecessor: Arnaldo Catalan
- Successor: Incumbent
- Previous post: Chaplain of His Holiness

Orders
- Ordination: 24 November 2001

Personal details
- Born: 18 June 1966 (age 59) Faenza, Italy

Monsignor Stefano Mazzotti is a Prelate of Honour of His Holiness serving as Pro-Chargé d'affaires of the Apostolic Nunciature to China in Taipei, Taiwan.

== Biography ==
Stefano was born in Faenza, Italy on 18 June 1966. He was ordained a priest for the Roman Catholic Diocese of Terni-Narni-Amelia on 24 November 2001. He has served as Chaplain of His Holiness from 20 April 2010 until 03 July 2020. He has been serving as Prelate of Honour of His Holiness since 03 July 2020. He is currently serving as Pro-Chargé d'affaires of the Apostolic Nunciature to China in Taipei, Taiwan.
