= Apostolic Nunciature to China =

Diplomatic post of the Holy See

Apostolic Nunciature to China Nuntiatura Apostolica in Sinis 教廷駐華大使館
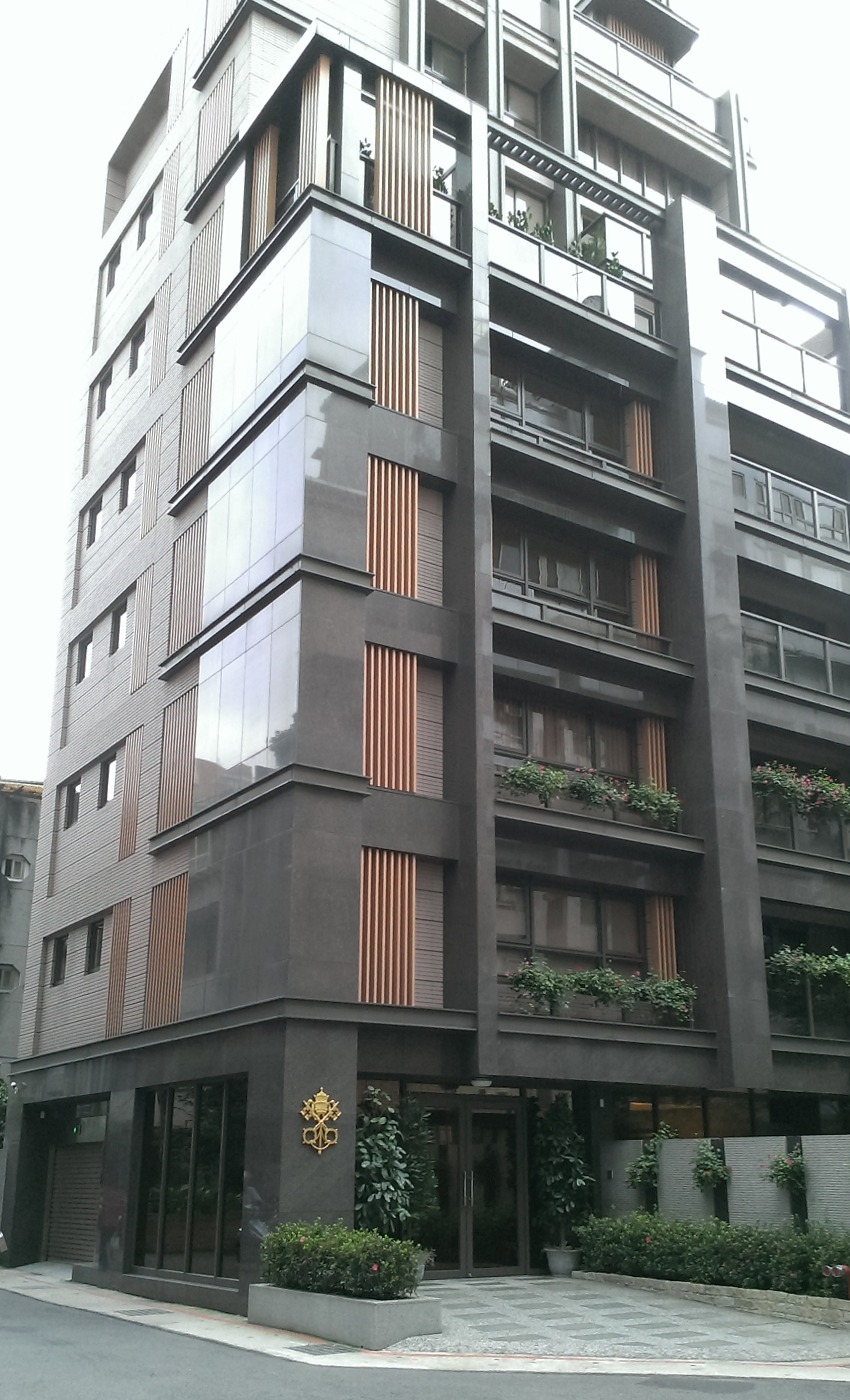
- The Apostolic Nunciature to the Republic of China in Taipei
- Location: Taipei, Taiwan, Republic of China
- Address: 7-1, Lane 265, Heping East Road Section 2, Da'an District
- Chargé d'affaires: Stefano Mazzotti

The Apostolic Nunciature to China is the diplomatic mission of the Holy See to the Republic of China (Taiwan). Located at 7–1, Lane 265, Heping East Road Section 2, Da'an District, Taipei, the Holy See conducts its relationship with China through formal diplomatic relations with Taiwan, and is the only European country in which Taiwan has an embassy. It does not have a formal diplomatic relationship with the People's Republic of China. The rank of a nuncio is equivalent to that of an ambassador. The post has been vacant since 1971, when UN Resolution 2758 was passed, recognizing the representatives of the PRC government as the only legitimate representatives of China. Since then, the mission has been headed by a chargé d'affaires.

== History ==
Efforts by both the Catholic Church and the Chinese government to establish direct contact began in the late Qing dynasty. Direct contact would break the restrictions of the Protectorate of missions of France. The Catholic Church responded to a request by Li Hongzhang of the Qing Empire on 3 May 1870 and established diplomatic ties. The church sent Archbishop Antonio Agliardi to China in early August as plenipotentiary with regard to diplomatic affairs. In July 1918, the Holy See and the Beiyang Government of the Republic of China agreed to send Giuseppe Petrelli and Dai Chenlin as their respective diplomats. However, this did not succeed due to objections from France.

Relations between the Republic of China and the Holy See strengthened in 1922 when Celso Benigno Luigi Costantini was appointed as an Apostolic Delegate to China, despite no diplomatic status. Official diplomatic ties were established in 1946 when Antonio Riberi assumed office as Apostolic Internuncio to China. In 1951, Riberi left mainland China following the relocation of the Government of the Republic of China to Taiwan. In 1966, the Apostolic Internunciature in China was upgraded to an Apostolic Nunciature. Since then, the Apostolic Nunciature to China sits in Taipei, Taiwan. Giuseppe Caprio became the first Apostolic Pro-Nuncio to China.

On 25 October, 1971, the United Nations General Assembly passed a resolution recognizing the People's Republic of China as the sole representative of China. The Holy See recalled the Apostolic Nuncio. Since that time, diplomatic affairs have been administered by chargés d'affaires. The diplomatic relationship between the ROC and the Holy See is significant from the perspective of the ROC because its embassy to the Holy See is its only remaining embassy in Europe.

== List of representatives ==
=== Apostolic Delegates to China (1922–1946) ===
In 1922, Father Celso Benigno Luigi Costantini was appointed by the Holy See as Apostolic Delegate to China, without diplomatic status.

Name	Name in Chinese	Nationality	Assumed office	Left office
Celso Benigno Luigi Costantini	剛恆毅 Gāng Héngyì	Italy	12 August 1922	1933
Mario Zanin	蔡寧 Cài Níng	Italy	7 January 1934	1946

=== Apostolic Internuncios to China (1946–1966) ===
Name	Name in Chinese	Nationality	Assumed office	Presentation of credentials	Left office
Antonio Riberi	黎培理 Lí Péilǐ	Monaco	6 July 1946	28 December 1946	1951
The Apostolic Nunciature to China was relocated to Taiwan in 1952 after the People's Republic of China broke off diplomatic ties with the Holy See.
Giuseppe Caprio	高理耀 Gāo Lǐyào	Italy	20 May 1959	29 October 1959	24 December 1966

=== Apostolic Nuncios to China (1966–present) ===
Name	Name in Chinese	Nationality	Assumed office	Presentation of credentials	Left office	Diplomatic title
Giuseppe Caprio	高理耀 Gāo Lǐyào	Italy	24 December 1966	30 January 1967	22 August 1967	Apostolic Pro-Nuncio
Luigi Accogli	艾可儀 Ài Kěyí	Italy	16 October 1967	23 December 1967	29 September 1970	Apostolic Pro-Nuncio
Edward Idris Cassidy	葛錫迪 Gé Xīdí	Australia	27 October 1970	5 December 1970	1979	Apostolic Pro-Nuncio
Cassidy was appointed apostolic nuncio to Bangladesh in 1972 and held both posts concurrently but moved to Bangladesh and left a chargés d'affaires to head the apostolic nunciature in Taipei. Since Cassidy left office in 1979, the post of apostolic nuncio to China has gone unfilled; the apostolic nunciature in Taipei has since been led by a chargés d'affaires.

==== Chargés d'affaires ====
Name	Name in Chinese	Nationality	Assumed office	Left office
Francesco Colasuonno	高樂天 Gāo Lètiān	Italy	2 August 1972	1974
Thomas A. White	陶懷德 Táo Huáidé	Ireland	1974	1978
Paolo Giglio	吉立友 Jí Lìyǒu	Malta	12 July 1978	1986
Piero Biggio	畢齊樂 Bì Qílè	Italy	6 April 1986	1988
Adriano Bernardini	裴納德 Péi Nàdé	Italy	17 January 1989	1992
Juliusz Janusz	尤雅士 Yóu Yǎshì	Poland	25 August 1992	1995
Joseph Chennoth	車納德 Chē Nàdé	India	26 April 1995	1999
Adolfo Tito Yllana	易福霖 Yì Fúlín	Philippines	20 September 1999	6 January 2002
James Patrick Green	格霖澤 Gé Línzé	United States	18 January 2002	2003
Ambrose Madtha	安博思 Ān Bósī	India	11 February 2003	8 May 2008
Paul Fitzpatrick Russell	陸思道 Lù Sīdào	United States	8 May 2008	19 March 2016
Slađan Ćosić	高德隆 Gāo Délóng	Bosnia and Herzegovina	19 March 2016	10 August 2019
Arnaldo Sanchez Catalan	佳安道 Jiā Āndào	Philippines	10 August 2019	31 January 2022
Stefano Mazzotti	馬德範 Mǎ Défàn	Italy	19 July 2022	

== See also ==
- China–Holy See relations
- Foreign relations of Taiwan
- Foreign relations of China
- Foreign relations of the Holy See
- Holy See–Taiwan relations
- List of diplomatic missions of the Holy See
- List of heads of the diplomatic missions of the Holy See
- Republic of China Ambassador to the Holy See (in Chinese)
