= Celso Benigno Luigi Costantini =

Catholic cardinal (1876–1958)

Servant of God Celso Benigno Luigi Costantini 剛恆毅
- Apostolic Chancery
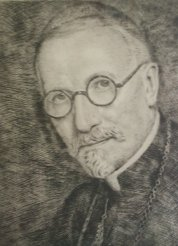
- Church: Roman Catholic Church
- Appointed: 22 May 1954
- Term ended: 17 October 1958
- Predecessor: Tommaso Pio Boggiani
- Successor: Santiago Luis Copello
- Other post: Cardinal-Priest of San Lorenzo in Damaso (1958)
- Previous posts: Apostolic Administrator of Rijeka (1920–21); Titular Bishop of Hierapolis (1921–22); Apostolic Delegate to China (1922–33); Titular Archbishop of Theodosiopolis in Arcadia (1922–53); Apostolic Administrator of Harbin (1931–33); Secretary of the Congregation for the Propagation of the Faith (1935–53); Cardinal-Priest of Ss. Nereo ed Achilleo (1953–58)

Orders
- Ordination: 26 December 1899 by Francesco Isola
- Consecration: 24 August 1921 by Pietro La Fontaine
- Created cardinal: 12 January 1953 by Pope Pius XII
- Rank: Cardinal-Priest

Personal details
- Born: Celso Benigno Luigi Costantini; 3 April 1876 Castions di Zoppola, Pordenone, Kingdom of Italy
- Died: 17 October 1958 (aged 82) Rome, Italy
- Motto: In hoc signo ("Under this sign")
- Coat of arms: Celso Benigno Luigi Costantini 剛恆毅's coat of arms

Sainthood
- Title as Saint: Servant of God

Ordination history of Celso Benigno Luigi Costantini
History
Priestly ordination
- Ordained by: Francesco Isola
- Date: 26 December 1899
- Place: Portogruaro, Kingdom of Italy
Episcopal consecration
- Principal consecrator: Pietro La Fontaine
- Co-consecrators: Angelo Bartolomasi & Luigi Paulini
- Date: 24 August 1921
Cardinalate
- Elevated by: Pope Pius XII
- Date: 12 January 1953
Episcopal succession
Bishops consecrated by Celso Benigno Luigi Costantini as principal consecrator
- Karol Slivovsky: 28 October 1923
- Paul Léon Cornelius Montaigne, C.M.: 19 April 1925
- Theodor Buddenbrock, S.V.D.: 7 June 1925
- Enrico Pascal Valtorta, P.I.M.E.: 13 June 1926
- Edward John Galvin, S.S.C.M.E.: 6 November 1927
- Pierre Cheng (Tcheng): 2 July 1928
- Georg Weig, S.V.D.: 23 September 1928
- Francis Xavier Wang Zepu (Tse-pu): 24 February 1930
- Paul Wang Wen-cheng (Uamuencem): 24 February 1930
- Francis Liu-Chiu-wen (Liou King wen): 12 October 1930
- Ignazio Canazei, S.D.B.: 9 November 1930
- James Robert Knox: 8 November 1953
- Alfredo Bruniera: 2 January 1955

Celso Benigno Luigi Costantini (Chinese: 剛恆毅, 3 April 1876 – 17 October 1958) was an Italian Roman Catholic cardinal and the founder of the Disciples of the Lord who served as the head of the Apostolic Chancery from 1954 until his death.

He was elevated to the cardinalate on 12 January 1953. He is best known for his work in China. Costantini dedicated himself to improving the work of missionaries and believed that evangelization in China belonged to the Chinese people. His time there heralded countless successes and he was careful never to involve himself in the complex politics between the Church and the State.

His cause for sainthood commenced on 24 June 2016 under Pope Francis and he has been titled as a Servant of God.

== Early years ==
Celso Benigno Luigi Costantini was born on 3 April 1876 in Castions di Zoppola as the second of ten children to Costante Costantini (a building contractor) and Maddalena Altan. His brother Giovanni (1880–1956) became the Bishop of La Spezia.

He followed his father's trade as a mason and worked since 1887 in that trade before deciding to undergo ecclesial studies. He studied first from 1892 until 1897 at Portogruaro and then attended as a part-time student at the Academica di San Tommaso in Rome from 1897 until 1899. It was there that he obtained his doctorates in philosophical and theological studies in 1899. He was ordained to the priesthood in Portogruaro on 26 December 1899 and then did pastoral work until 1914 in Concordia where he was also elected as capitular vicar and as a chaplain for the Portogruaro hospital.

In Costantini's view, the arts could give expression to God's truth and beauty. In 1911, he founded a Society of Friends of Christian Art. In 1913, he founded Art Sacra, a scholarly journal focused on Catholic art history.

In 1915, he founded the illustrated journal "Arte Cristiana" and served as its director until 1924. During World War I, he served as a chaplain in the Italian Armed Forces since 12 December 1917. He served as the Concordia diocese's vicar general from 5 November 1918 to 30 April 1920, when he was made apostolic administrator for Fiume until a replacement bishop for that diocese could be found. Costantini was also friends with Agostino Gemelli and over time expressed his support for the convocation of a new ecumenical council though this would not happen until after his death. He also was close with Alcide De Gasperi and the two housed together at some stage in 1944.

== China ==
He became the Titular Bishop of Hierapolis in 1921 and he received his episcopal consecration a month after from Cardinal Pietro La Fontaine with Angelo Bartolomasi and Luigi Paulini serving as the co-consecrators. Pope Pius XI appointed Costantini as the first Apostolic Delegate to China on 12 August 1922 and also made him Titular Archbishop of Theodosiopolis in Arcadia the following month. He met with Pius XI before his departure and with Cardinal Willem Marinus van Rossum who advised Costantini to implement all dimensions of Maximum illud, Pope Benedict XV's 1919 apostolic letter on the work of missionaries. Prior to leaving, Costantini was elevated to Archbishop in order for him to be the highest ranking prelate in China upon arrival.

Costantini arrived in Hong Kong on 8 November 1922.

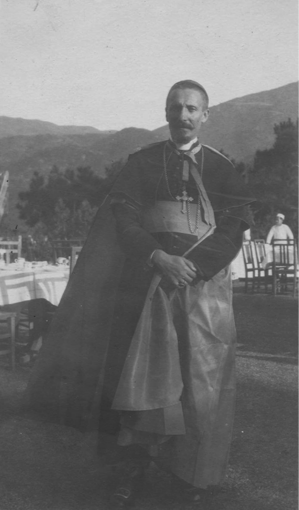
Costantini in Kaying (present-day Meixian) in 1924

In China, Costantini stated that four principles governed his work: (1) the mission for principally for evangelization, (2) he would respect the sovereignty of China and all other governments, (3) the Holy See did not want to interfere on political issues except those which impacted its spiritual mission, (4) that the Pope loved China, that the Holy See was not an imperial power, and that it sought to foster China's well-being, and (5) most important the Catholic Church's enterprise in China was missionary work.

In some historical views, Costantini's arrival in China marks the end of the French religious protectorate in China.

In his work with missions in China, Costantini contended, "It is wrong to make use of Western art in China" and that the Church should encourage "genuine expression of the genius of the indigenous people".

In 1923, Costantini convinced the Vicar Apostolic of Hankou to cede part of his territory for the creation of the apostolic prefecture of Bushi, where Chinese priest Odoric Cheng became the first Chinese Prefect Apostolic in more than 250 years.

Costantini met the Foreign Minister Gu Weijun when he visited Beijing for the first time in mid-1923. He called the first episcopal conference in Shanghai in mid-1924 and made constitutions for the missions in China. He also helped found the Fu Jen Catholic college.

From 15 May to 13 June 1924, Costantini led a synod in Shanghai, which was the first nationwide council of the Catholic Church in China.

He identified six indigenous Chinese candidates for episcopal ordination and established several regional major seminaries. In 1926, the first six Chinese bishops in modern history were consecrated in Rome.

He founded the Disciples of the Lord in 1928 with the help of the Spanish Redemptorist missionaries, and he became the apostolic administrator for Harbin in 1931 though returned to his homeland at that time and then to the United States to recover from several health issues. On 28 October 1926 he was present in the Sistine Chapel when Pius XI consecrated the first six Chinese bishops after he and the bishops-elect left from Shanghai on the previous 10 September.

== Curial service ==
The archbishop left China in 1933 and entered the service of the Roman Curia where he was appointed to the Congregation for Propagation of Faith first as a consulter on 3 December 1933 and then to its leadership on 20 December 1935 as its second-in-command. He was the second-highest official of that department under Cardinal Pietro Fumasoni Biondi. In 1936 he was made an Assistant at the Pontifical Throne. Pope Pius XII created him Cardinal-Priest of Santi Nereo e Achilleo on 12 January 1953. Costantini was made a member of some of the curial departments including Oriental Churches and the Congregation for Rites. Several months later he was named as the Apostolic Chancellor and opted for the cardinalitial title of San Lorenzo in Damaso on 9 June 1958.

== Death ==
He died of heart failure in Rome on 17 October 1958, three weeks after surgery, at the Villa Margherita Clinic in Via Massimo. His death followed that of Pope Pius XII and preceded the start of the conclave to choose his successor. Before his death, he told Cardinal Angelo Giuseppe Roncalli, soon to be elected pope, that he supported the candidacy of Gregorio Pietro Agagianian. He was buried next to his brother Bishop Giovanni Constantini in Zoppola. In 1959 his brother's remains were relocated to La Spezia.

== Beatification process ==
The beatification process received support on 30 September 2016 from the Trivenetian Episcopal Conference who endorsed the cause which had opened some months prior. It opened under Pope Francis on 24 June 2016 after the Congregation for the Causes of Saints titled him as a Servant of God and transferred the forum of investigation from Rome to Concordia. The diocesan process was inaugurated on 17 October 2017 and is ongoing.

The current postulator for this cause is Father Ader Nasr and the vice-postulator is Father Simon ee-Kim chong.

It is predicted that the cause's progress will be slow due to the divergent China-Vatican relations.

Diplomatic posts
Preceded by None	Apostolic Delegate to China; 12 August 1922 – 20 December 1935	Succeeded by Mario Zanin
Catholic Church titles
Preceded by Carlo Salotti	Secretary of the Congregation for the Propagation of the Faith; 20 December 1935 – 12 January 1953	Succeeded by Filippo Bernardini
Preceded by Dennis Joseph Dougherty	Cardinal-Priest of Santi Nereo e Achilleo; 15 January 1953 – 9 June 1958	Succeeded by William Godfrey
Preceded by Tommaso Boggiani	Apostolic Chancellor; 22 May 1954 – 17 October 1958	Succeeded by Santiago Copello
Preceded by Tommaso Pio Boggiani	Cardinal-Priest of San Lorenzo in Damaso; 9 June 1958 – 17 October 1958	Succeeded by Santiago Copello
