= Luigi Accogli =

Italian prelate

Luigi Accogli (16 August 1917 – 21 June 2004) was an Italian prelate of the Catholic Church who spent his career in the diplomatic service of the Holy See, including stints as Apostolic Nuncio in China, Ecuador, Bangladesh, and Syria.

Accogli in 1999

== Biography ==
Luigi Accogli was born in Andrano in the Province of Lecce on 16 August 1917. He was ordained a priest on 6 March 1943. To prepare for a diplomatic career he entered the Pontifical Ecclesiastical Academy in 1946.

On 19 October 1967, Pope Paul VI named him a titular archbishop and Apostolic Nuncio to China. He received his episcopal consecration from Cardinal Amleto Cicognani on 26 November 1967.

On 29 September 1970, Pope Paul VI appointed him Apostolic Nuncio to Ecuador. On 6 July 1979, Pope John Paul II named him Apostolic Nuncio to Bangladesh. On 17 June 1988, Pope John Paul named him Apostolic Nuncio to Syria.

He retired when he was replaced in that position on 11 February 1993.

He died on 21 June 2004.
