= Giuseppe Caprio =

Italian cardinal

His Eminence Giuseppe Caprio
- Grand Master Emeritus of the Equestrian Order of the Holy Sepulchre of Jerusalem
- Church: Roman Catholic Church
- Appointed: 14 December 1988
- Term ended: 21 December 1995
- Predecessor: Maximilien de Fürstenberg
- Successor: Carlo Furno
- Other post: Cardinal-Priest of Santa Maria della Vittoria (1990–2005)
- Previous posts: Apostolic Internuncio to China (1959–66); Titular Archbishop of Apollonia (1961–79); Apostolic Pro-Nuncio to China (1966–67); Apostolic Pro-Nuncio to India (1967–69); Secretary of the Administration of the Patrimony of the Apostolic See (1969–77); Substitute for General Affairs (1977–79); Pro-President of the Administration of the Patrimony of the Apostolic See (1979); Cardinal-Deacon of Santa Maria Ausiliatrice in Via Tuscolana (1979–90); President of the Administration of the Patrimony of the Apostolic See (1979–81); President of the Prefecture for the Economic Affairs of the Holy See (1981–90); Protodeacon (1987–90)

Orders
- Ordination: 17 December 1938 by Francesco Marchetti Selvaggiani
- Consecration: 14 December 1961 by Grégoire-Pierre Agagianian
- Created cardinal: 30 June 1979 by Pope John Paul II
- Rank: Cardinal-Deacon (1979–90); Cardinal-Priest (1990–2005)

Personal details
- Born: Giuseppe Caprio; 15 November 1914 Lapio, Benevento, Kingdom of Italy
- Died: 15 October 2005 (aged 90) Rome, Italy
- Education: Pontifical Gregorian University; Pontifical Academy of Ecclesiastical Nobles
- Motto: Pax in virtute
- Coat of arms

Styles of Giuseppe Caprio
- Reference style: His Eminence
- Spoken style: Your Eminence
- Religious style: Cardinal
- Informal style: Cardinal

Giuseppe Caprio (15 November 1914 – 15 October 2005), was an Italian cardinal of the Roman Catholic Church. He held the post of President of the Prefecture for the Economic Affairs of the Holy See before he retired in 1990.

Caprio was born just outside Naples and studied at the Gregorian University in Rome before being ordained in 1938. He worked in China for four years before being posted to Vietnam and Taiwan.

He was the internuncio, then pro-nuncio, to China from 1959 to 1967, and the pro-nuncio to India from 1967 to 1969.

He then transferred to the Roman Curia, serving as secretary of the Administration of the Patrimony of the Holy See, then to the Secretariat of State, where he worked for Pope John Paul I before being appointed President of the Administration of the Patrimony of the Holy See in 1979, and then to the presidency of the Prefecture for the Economic Affairs of the Holy See in 1981.

He was elevated to the cardinalate in 1979, becoming Cardinal-Deacon of S. Maria Ausiliatrice in Via Tuscolana. He was Cardinal Protodeacon from 22 June 1987.

Cardinal Caprio opted for the order of cardinal priests on 26 November 1990, and became the Cardinal-Priest of the titular church of Santa Maria della Vittoria.

He was a member of the Constantinian Order. He was also a Knight of St. Januarius.

His motto was "Pax in virtute" (peace in power).

Catholic Church titles
Preceded by Giovanni Benelli	Substitute for General Affairs; 14 June 1977 – 28 April 1979	Succeeded by Eduardo Martínez Somalo
Preceded by Jean-Marie Villot	President of the Administration of the Patrimony of the Apostolic See; 28 April 1979 – 30 January 1981	Succeeded by Agostino Casaroli
Preceded by Egidio Vagnozzi	President for the Prefecture of the Economic Affairs of the Holy See; 1981–1990	Succeeded by Edmund Szoka
Preceded by Opilio Rossi	Cardinal Protodeacon; 22 June 1987 – 26 November 1990	Succeeded by Aurelio Sabattani
Preceded by Maximilien de Furstenberg	Grand Master of the Equestrian Order of the Holy Sepulchre of Jerusalem; 1988–1995	Succeeded by Carlo Furno
Preceded by James Knox	Apostolic Pro-nuncio to India; 22 Aug 1967 – 19 Apr 1969	Succeeded by Marie-Joseph Lemieux
