= Mario Zanin (bishop) =

Italian prelate and papal diplomat

Monsignor Mario Zanin
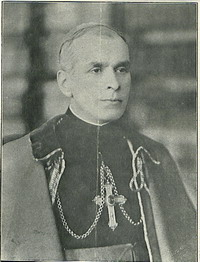
- See: Titular Archbishop of Traianopolis in Rhodope
- Predecessor: Giacinto Gaggia
- Successor: Albert-Pierre Falière
- Other posts: Apostolic Administrator of Harbin (1933–1946); Apostolic Delegate to China (1933–1946); Apostolic Nuncio to Chile (1947–1953); Apostolic Nuncio to Argentina (1953–1958)

Orders
- Ordination: 18 July 1913
- Consecration: 7 January 1934
- Rank: Archbishop

Personal details
- Born: Mario Zanin; April 3, 1890 Feltre, Italy
- Died: August 4, 1958 (aged 68) Buenos Aires, Argentina
- Denomination: Roman Catholic

Mario Zanin (April 3, 1890 – August 4, 1958), sometimes referred to by the French form of his name, Marius Zanin, and also known by the Chinese name Cài Níng (蔡寧), was an Italian prelate and papal diplomat. He served as Apostolic Delegate to China from 1933 to 1946, as Apostolic Nuncio to Chile from 1947 to 1953, and as Apostolic Nuncio to Argentina from 1953 to 1958.

== China ==
As Apostolic Delegate in China Zanin did not have the rank of a Vatican ambassador to the Chinese government. He was nevertheless accorded the honours reserved for Ministers Plenipotentiary.

In 1939, after the Japanese conquest of Nanjing, Zanin remained in occupied territory, delegating to an American Franciscan his authority regarding the area held by the Chinese government, whose provisional capital was Chongqing. According to Japanese diplomatic cables, he recommended to Pope Pius XII that the Vatican should recognize the Nanjing-based Reorganized National Government of China (a Japanese puppet state) as the legitimate government of China as opposed to the KMT government in Chongqing.

In the occupied area, Catholics, like most people, adjusted to Japanese rule. In some locales, Catholics tried to work with the new authorities. Zanin received complaints about missionaries who showed sympathy with the occupiers. On the other hand, after the killing, near a mission headquarters, of Chinese soldiers under Japanese command, some 60 Catholics, including a bishop, thought to have been involved were arrested with the intention of subjecting them to court-martial, but after intervention by the French diplomatic representatives were, except for one priest, released on condition that the bishop, who had previously refused to meet the Japanese authorities, be removed from his post. Missionaries were interned, and some were killed. Zanin mandated strict neutrality, asking the bishops to tell their priests "to avoid even the appearance of any action that ... could give an excuse for retribution against the mission residences. ... Do not let the whole community perish on account of one person's imprudence." This was unpopular with those who advocated some form of passive or active resistance to the invader, and led to formal representations from Chiang Kai-shek's government.

== South America ==
Claude Bowers, the American ambassador in Chile, described Zanin in the late 1940s as "a tall, slender man with graying hair, ... highly cultivated, exceptionally able and brilliant".

In 1953, Zanin was transferred to the nunciature in Buenos Aires, where he died on 4 August 1958. While in this post he witnessed the 1955 Revolución Libertadora that ended the rule of Juan Perón.
