= Edward Cassidy =

Australian Roman Catholic cardinal (1924–2021)

His Eminence Edward Cassidy AC
- President Emeritus of the Pontifical Council for Promoting Christian Unity
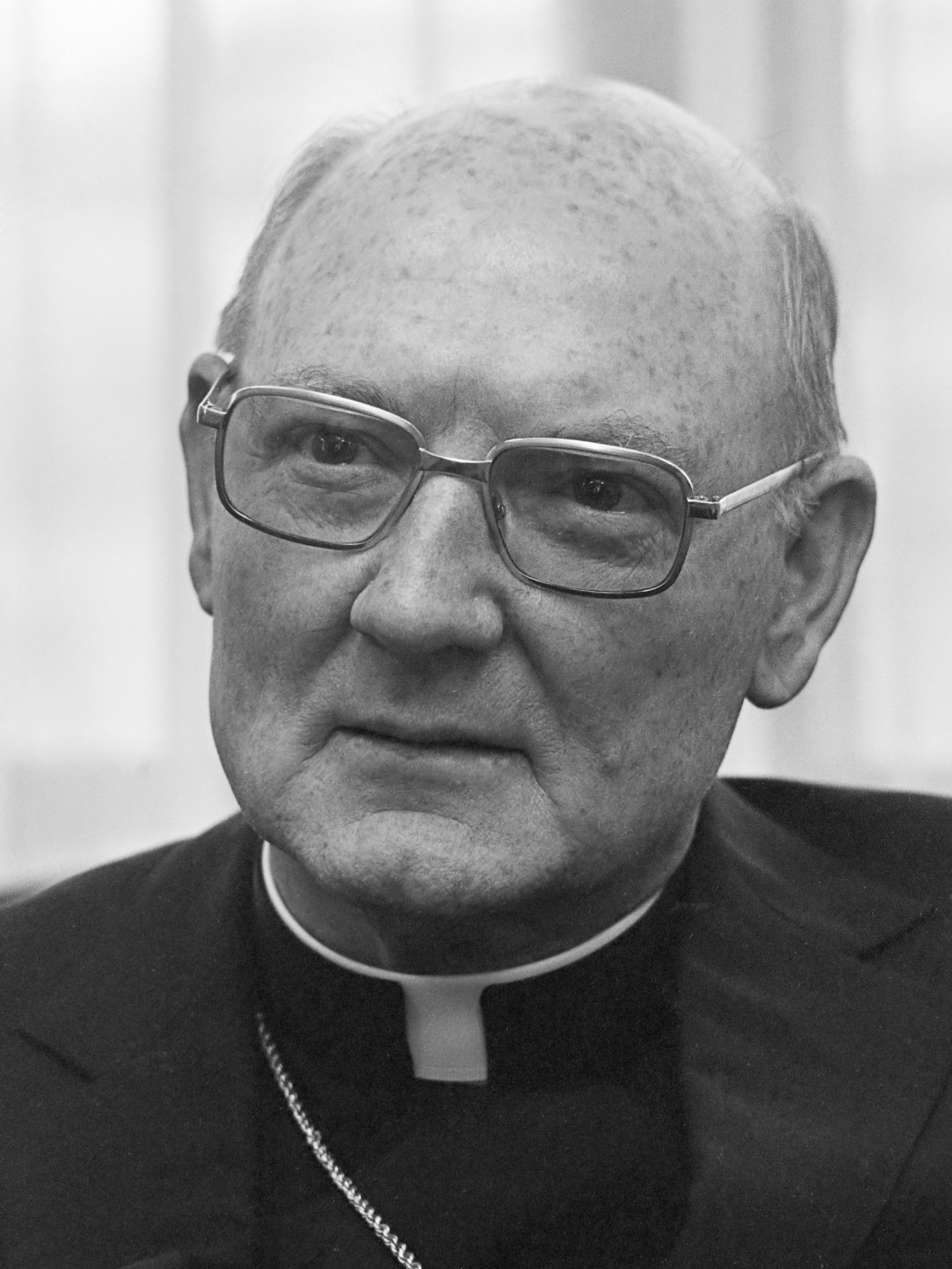
- Cassidy, 11 December 1984
- Church: Roman Catholic Church
- Appointed: 12 December 1989
- Term ended: 3 March 2001
- Predecessor: Johannes Willebrands
- Successor: Walter Kasper
- Other post: Cardinal-Priest 'pro hac vice' of Santa Maria in Via Lata (2002–2021)
- Previous posts: Apostolic Pro-Nuncio to China (1970–79); Titular Archbishop of Amantia (1970–1991); Apostolic Pro-Nuncio to Bangladesh (1973–79); Apostolic Pro-Nuncio to Lesotho (1979–1984); Apostolic Delegate to Southern Africa (1979–1984); Apostolic Pro-Nuncio to the Netherlands (1984–88); Substitute for General Affairs (1988–89); President of the Commission for Religious Relations with the Jews (1989–2001); Cardinal-Deacon of Santa Maria in Via Lata (1991–2002)

Orders
- Ordination: 23 July 1949 by Norman Thomas Gilroy
- Consecration: 15 November 1970 by Jean-Marie Villot
- Created cardinal: 28 June 1991 by Pope John Paul II
- Rank: Cardinal-Deacon (1991–2002); Cardinal-Priest (2002–2021)

Personal details
- Born: Edward Idris Cassidy; 5 July 1924 Sydney, New South Wales, Australia
- Died: 10 April 2021 (aged 96) Newcastle, New South Wales, Australia
- Education: Pontifical Lateran University; Pontifical Ecclesiastical Academy
- Motto: Fortitudo mea Dominus
- Coat of arms

Styles of Edward Idris Cassidy
- Reference style: His Eminence
- Spoken style: Your Eminence
- Informal style: Cardinal
- See: Amantia (titular see)

Edward Idris Cassidy AC (5 July 1924 – 10 April 2021) was an Australian prelate of the Catholic Church who was president of the Pontifical Council for Promoting Christian Unity from 1989 to 2001. He headed the Commission of the Holy See for Religious Relations with the Jews. He spent most of his career in the diplomatic service of the Holy See both in Rome and overseas. He was made a cardinal in 1991.

== Early life ==
Cassidy was born in Sydney on 5 July 1924. His parents were not Catholic and divorced while he was just one. When he was a student at Parramatta High School, a priest from St Felix's parish discouraged Cassidy from becoming a priest because he had not finished his secondary education, had not studied in Catholic schools and his family background was "unsuitable". Due to financial difficulties after his grandfather died, he left school to support his grandmother in 1939 and worked at the New South Wales Department of Road Transport as a junior clerk. In 1942, he presented his case for entering the seminary directly to Archbishop Norman Gilroy of Sydney, who accepted his arguments. Cassidy entered the local seminary, St Columba's Catholic College in Springwood, in February 1943.

Cassidy was ordained a priest of the Archdiocese of Sydney on 23 July 1949 at St Mary's Cathedral, Sydney, by Cardinal Gilroy. Edward Bede Clancy, like Cassidy a future cardinal, was ordained at the same time. He volunteered to transfer to the Diocese of Wagga Wagga and in January 1950 he was assigned to the small parish of Yenda.

== Diplomatic service ==
In 1952, Bishop Francis Henschke of Wagga Wagga asked him if he would like to go to Rome to study canon law; he agreed and left for Rome on 1 September 1952. While studying in Rome, he resided at Collegio Sant'Apollinare, next to Piazza Navona. He completed his education studying at the Pontifical Lateran University in Rome, where he obtained a doctorate in canon law in July 1955 with a dissertation on the history and juridical nature of apostolic delegations, and at the Pontifical Ecclesiastical Academy, also in Rome, from October 1953, where he obtained a diploma in diplomatic studies. After finishing his studies, he joined the Vatican diplomatic service in July 1955.

He served in the nunciatures in India, Portugal, and Ireland. He was appointed counsellor of the apostolic delegation in the United States in June 1967, but as the nuncio in Ireland, Archbishop Giuseppe Sensi, was then transferred to the nunciature in Portugal, Cassidy was required to stay in Dublin until the following November. He then did not take up his role in the US, and was named instead counselor of the nunciature in El Salvador, where he remained until the end of 1969, at which point he became counselor of the nunciature in Argentina.

On 27 October 1970 he was appointed titular bishop of Amantia and Apostolic Pro-Nuncio to the Republic of China. He was consecrated on 15 November by Cardinal Jean-Marie Villot assisted by Archbishops Giovanni Benelli and Matthew Beovich, representing Cardinal Sergio Pignedoli. On 31 January 1973 he was additionally named the first Apostolic Pro-Nuncio to Bangladesh (Cassidy relocated to Dhaka shortly thereafter) and Apostolic Delegate to Burma. On 25 March 1979, Pope John Paul II appointed him Apostolic Delegate to Southern Africa and Apostolic Pro-Nuncio to Lesotho. His term as Apostolic Pro-Nuncio to China only ended in April 1979; he was the last to hold that title. On 6 November 1984, he was appointed Apostolic Pro-Nuncio to the Netherlands.

== Roman Curia ==
On 30 May 1988 he was appointed Substitute of the Secretariat of State in the Roman Curia. After only a year he was appointed president of the Pontifical Council for Promoting Christian Unity. In the consistory of 28 June 1991 Pope John Paul II created him Cardinal-Deacon of S. Maria in Via Lata. On 26 February 2002 he took the option open to cardinal deacons to be elevated to the rank of cardinal priest after ten years as a cardinal deacon.

In 1999, Cassidy was jointly responsible for the publication of the Joint Declaration on the Doctrine of Justification, widely received as a landmark achievement for ecumenism in bridging the centuries-long divide between Catholics and Lutherans. Reflecting on his involvement, Cassidy joked that signing it would be the one thing he could confidently cite on his behalf on judgement day.

== Retirement ==
When he retired in 2001, he returned to his native Australia, where he substituted for local priests on occasion and served as chaplain to the Italian-speaking community of Newcastle.

His book titled Rediscovering Vatican II – Ecumenism and Interreligious Dialogue, was published 2005 and marked the 40th anniversary of the Vatican's ecumenism declaration Nostra aetate. The book made a significant contribution to ongoing international inter-religious dialogue.

Cassidy died in Newcastle, Australia, on 10 April 2021 at the age of 96.

== Honours ==
In 1990, Cassidy was appointed a Companion of the Order of Australia (AC) in "recognition of service to the [sic] religion and to international affairs".

In 2006, the LDS Church in Australia presented Cassidy with an award for his efforts to bring better understanding to the people of the world. Presenting the "John Simpson Standing for Something" award to Cassidy for his role in building interfaith relations across the world, LDS Elder Paul Sybrowsky said that "Latter-day Saints have seen that Cardinal Cassidy is indeed a man filled with faith and courage to help make this a better world for all to live in." In a message of congratulations, Premier Morris Iemma (also a Catholic) said that "no Australian has risen to greater eminence in the Catholic Church, and none has been such a devoted servant of the cause of ecumenism and inter-faith dialogue."

Diplomatic posts
Preceded by Luigi Accogli	Apostolic Pro-Nuncio to China; 27 October 1970 – 25 March 1979	Office abolished
Nunciature created	Apostolic Pro-Nuncio to Bangladesh; 31 January 1973 – 25 March 1979	Succeeded by Luigi Accogli
Preceded by Alfredo Poledrini	Apostolic Pro-Nuncio to Lesotho; 25 March 1979 – 6 November 1984	Succeeded by Joseph Mees
Preceded by Alfredo Poledrini	Apostolic Delegate to Southern Africa; 25 March 1979 – 6 November 1984	Succeeded by Joseph Mees
Preceded by Bruno Wüstenberg	Apostolic Pro-Nuncio to the Netherlands; 6 November 1984 – 23 March 1988	Succeeded by Audrys Juozas Bačkis
Catholic Church titles
Titular see created	— TITULAR — Titular Archbishop of Amantia; 27 October 1970 – 28 June 1991	Succeeded by Johannes Liku Ada'
Preceded by Johannes Willebrands	President of the Pontifical Council for Promoting Christian Unity; 12 December 1989 – 3 March 2001	Succeeded by Walter Kasper
Office created	President of the Commission for Religious Relations with the Jews; 12 December 1989 – 3 March 2001	Succeeded by Walter Kasper
Preceded by Władysław Rubin	Cardinal-Deacon of Santa Maria in Via Lata; 28 June 1991 – 26 February 2002	
	Cardinal-Priest of Santa Maria in Via Lata; 26 February 2002 – 10 April 2021	Vacant
Political offices
Preceded by Eduardo Martínez Somalo	Substitute for General Affairs; 23 March 1988 – 12 December 1989	Succeeded by Giovanni Battista Re
