= Blasco Francisco Collaço =

Indian prelate

His Excellency, The Most Reverend Blasco Francisco Collaço
- Apostolic Nuncio Emeritus to South Africa, Botswana, Lesotho, Namibia and Eswatini; Titular Archbishop of Octava
- Appointed: 24 May 2000
- Retired: 17 August 2006
- Predecessor: Manuel Monteiro de Castro
- Successor: James Green
- Other post: Titular Archbishop of Octava
- Previous posts: Apostolic Nuncio to Bulgaria (1996-2000); Apostolic Nuncio to Seychelles (1994-1996); Apostolic Pro-Nuncio to Madagascar and Mauritius (1991-1996); Apostolic Nuncio to Dominican Republic and Apostolic Delegate to Puerto Rico (1982-1991); Apostolic Nuncio to Panama (1977-1982)

Orders
- Ordination: 2 May 1954
- Consecration: 5 November 1977 by Jean-Marie Villot, Agostino Casaroli, and Duraisamy Simon Lourdusamy

Personal details
- Born: 16 May 1931 (age 95) Raia, Goa, Portuguese India

Styles of Blasco Francisco Collaço
- Reference style: His Excellency; The Most Reverend
- Spoken style: Your Excellency
- Religious style: Archbishop

Blasco Francisco Collaço (born 16 May 1931) is an Indian prelate of the Catholic Church who spent his career in the diplomatic service of the Holy See, including 30 years as an apostolic nuncio.

== Biography ==
Collaço was born in Raia, Goa, India, on 16 May 1931. He attended the Seminary of Rachol from 1941 to 1953. He was ordained a priest on 2 May 1954. Studying from 1954 to 1957 at Rome's Pontifical Urban University, he earned a doctorate in canon law. He spent the next year at the Pontifical Academy of Social Sciences. To prepare for a diplomatic career he entered the Pontifical Ecclesiastical Academy in 1959.

== Diplomatic career ==
He entered the diplomatic service of the Holy See in 1961 and filled assignments in Colombia, Australia (an office with responsibility for New Zealand and Oceania), France, Scandinavia, and Honduras. Beginning in 1976, he worked in the Roman Curia in the Office of Public Affairs.

On 23 September 1977, Pope Paul VI named Apostolic Nuncio to Panama and a titular archbishop. He was consecrated a bishop on 5 November 1977 by Cardinal Jean-Marie Villot. He was the first Indian and the first Goan priest to have the title of "Nuncio".

On 26 July 1982, Pope John Paul II appointed him apostolic nuncio to the Dominican Republic. He became Apostolic Delegate to Puerto Rico that year as well.

On 28 February 1991, Pope John Paul named him Apostolic Pro-Nuncio to Madagascar and Mauritius. He added the title apostolic nuncio to Seychelles on 4 May 1994.

On 13 April 1996, Pope John Paul appointed him Apostolic Nuncio to Bulgaria, where the Church and the government remained at odds over the restitution of Church property since the collapse of Communism in 1989.

On 24 May 2000, he appointed Collaço Apostolic Nuncio to South Africa and Namibia, and Apostolic Delegate to Botswana. On 24 June 2000, he added the responsibilities of Apostolic Nuncio to Lesotho and Swaziland.

Collaço retired from these positions in August 2006.

He appears as a character in the novel The Fifth Gospel by Ian Caldwell.

== See also ==
- List of heads of the diplomatic missions of the Holy See
