= Joseph Mees =

Belgian prelate

- Apostolic Pro-Nuncio to Lesotho; Apostolic Delegate to Southern Africa
- Church: Catholic Church
- In office: 19 January 1985 – October 1987
- Predecessor: Edward Cassidy
- Successor: Ambrose De Paoli
- Other post: Titular Archbishop of Ypres (1969-2001)
- Previous posts: Apostolic Nuncio to Paraguay (1973-1985); Apostolic Nuncio to Indonesia (1969-1973)

Orders
- Ordination: 4 April 1948
- Consecration: 30 June 1969 by Jean-Marie Villot

Personal details
- Born: 18 April 1923 Bornem, Antwerp Province, Belgium
- Died: 9 December 2001 (aged 78)

Joseph Mees (18 April 1923 – 9 December 2001) was a Belgian prelate of the Catholic Church who spent his career in the diplomatic service of the Holy See, including almost twenty years as an Apostolic Nuncio.

== Biography ==
Joseph Mees was born in Bornem, Belgium, on 18 April 1923. He was ordained a priest on 4 April 1948.

To prepare for a diplomatic career he entered the Pontifical Ecclesiastical Academy in 1948.

On 14 June 1969, Pope Paul VI named him a titular archbishop and Apostolic Nuncio to Indonesia. He received his episcopal consecration from Cardinal Jean-Marie Villot on 30 June 1969.

On 11 July 1973, Pope Paul appointed him Apostolic Nuncio to Paraguay. He had a close relationship with Paraguayan dictator Alfredo Stroessner.

On 19 January 1985, Pope John Paul II named him Apostolic Delegate to Southern Africa and Apostolic Pro-Nuncio to Lesotho. Rather than support the anti-apartheid efforts of the South African bishops led by Denis Hurley, Archbishop of Durban, Mees quoted Pope John Paul's structures against clerical participation in politics, the same words South African President P.W. Botha had quoted to the bishops: "It is not for the pastors of the Church to intervene directly in the political construction and organization of social life. This task forms part of the vocation of the laity acting on their own initiative with their fellow citizens." Mees left South Africa in October 1987, apparently recalled to Rome, leaving in charge of the nunciature Mario Cassari, who gave the bishops' political efforts his enthusiastic endorsement.

Mees died on 9 December 2001.
