= Apostolic Nunciature to Eswatini =

Diplomatic Mission of the Holy See in Eswatini

The Apostolic Nunciature to Eswatini (formerly Swaziland) is an ecclesiastical office of the Catholic Church in Eswatini. It is a diplomatic post of the Holy See, whose representative is called the Apostolic Nuncio with the rank of an ambassador. The title Apostolic Nuncio to Eswatini is held by the prelate appointed Apostolic Nuncio to South Africa; he resides in South Africa.

Pope John Paul II established the Nunciature to Eswatini on 10 March 1992.

== List of papal representatives to Eswatini ==
Apostolic Delegates

- Ambrose Battista De Paoli (17 April 1993 – 11 November 1997)

Apostolic Nuncios

- Manuel Monteiro de Castro (2 February 1998 – 1 March 2000)
- Blasco Francisco Collaço (24 June 2000 – August 2006)
- James Patrick Green (23 September 2006 – 15 October 2011)
- Mario Roberto Cassari (10 March 2012 – 22 May 2015)
- Peter Bryan Wells (13 June 2016 – 8 February 2023)
- Henryk Jagodziński (19 July 2024 – present)
