= Apostolic Nunciature to Lesotho =

Diplomatic post of the Holy See

The Apostolic Nunciature to Lesotho is an ecclesiastical office of the Catholic Church in Lesotho. It is a diplomatic post of the Holy See, whose representative is called the Apostolic Nuncio with the rank of an ambassador. The title Apostolic Nuncio to Lesotho is held by the prelate appointed Apostolic Nuncio to South Africa; he resides in South Africa.

== List of papal representatives to Lesotho ==
Apostolic Pro-Nuncios

- John Gordon (19 August 1967 – 11 August 1971)
- Alfredo Poledrini (20 September 1971 – 18 September 1978)
- Edward Idris Cassidy (25 March 1979 – 6 November 1984)
- Joseph Mees (19 January 1985 – October 1987)
- Ambrose Battista De Paoli (6 February 1988 – 11 November 1997)

Apostolic Nuncios

- Manuel Monteiro de Castro (7 March 1998 – 1 March 2000)
- Blasco Francisco Collaço (24 June 2000 – August 2006)
- James Patrick Green (6 September 2006 – 15 October 2011)
- Mario Roberto Cassari (17 March 2012 – 22 May 2015)
- Peter Bryan Wells (13 February 2016 – 8 February 2023)
- Henryk Jagodziński (16 April 2024 – present)
