= Ceirano (surname) =

Ceirano is a surname. Notable people with the surname include:

- Giovanni Battista Ceirano (1860–1912), Italian automobile industrialist, eldest of four Ceirano brothers
- Giovanni Ceirano (1865–1948), Italian automobile industrialist, second of four Ceirano brothers
- Giovanni Ceirano (nuncio) (1927–2006), Vatican diplomat and archbishop
- Matteo Ceirano (1870–1941), Italian automobile industrialist, third of four Ceirano brothers
- Ernesto Ceirano (1875 -?) an automobile racer, winner of the 1908 Targa Florio, the youngest of the four Ceirano brothers
- Giovanni "Ernesto" Ceirano (1889–1956), son of Giovanni Ceirano, industrialist and racing driver

== See also ==
- Ceirano (disambiguation)
