= James Green (bishop) =

American Catholic prelate (born 1950)

His Excellency, The Most Reverend James Patrick Green
- Apostolic Nuncio emeritus of Iceland, Sweden, Denmark, Finland, and Norway; Titular Archbishop of Altinum
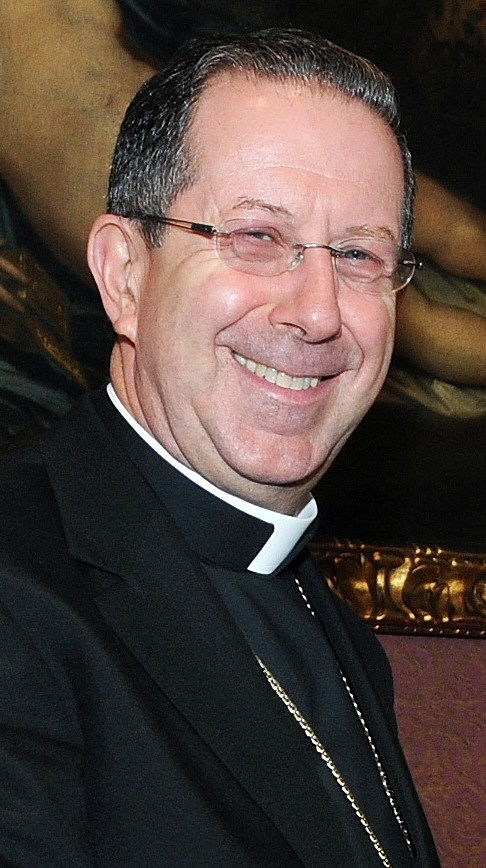
- Green in 2012
- Appointed: 6 April 2017 (Sweden, Iceland); 13 June 2017 (Denmark); 12 October 2017 (Finland); 18 October 2017 (Norway)
- Retired: 30 April 2022
- Predecessor: Henryk Józef Nowacki
- Successor: Julio Murat
- Other post: Titular Archbishop of Altinum
- Previous posts: Apostolic Nuncio to Peru (2011–2017); Apostolic Nuncio to South Africa, Namibia, Lesotho, Swaziland, Botswana (2003–2011); Chargé d'affaires to China (2002-2003)

Orders
- Ordination: 15 May 1976 by John Krol
- Consecration: 6 September 2006 by Angelo Sodano, Ivan Dias and Justin Francis Rigali

Personal details
- Born: May 3, 1950 (age 76) Philadelphia, Pennsylvania, U.S.

Styles of James Patrick Green
- Reference style: His Excellency; The Most Reverend
- Spoken style: Your Excellency
- Religious style: Archbishop

James Patrick Green (born May 3, 1950) is an American prelate of the Catholic Church who from 2006 to 2022 served as apostolic nuncio to a variety of countries including to several Scandinavian countries from 2017 to 2022.

Green consecrated Robert F. Prevost, who would go on to become Pope Leo XIV after the 2025 papal conclave, as a bishop.

== Early years ==
Green was born on May 3, 1950, in Philadelphia, Pennsylvania. He studied for the priesthood and was ordained a priest of the Archdiocese of Philadelphia on May 15, 1976.

== Diplomatic career ==
During his early years in the diplomatic service of the Holy See, he served in Papua New Guinea, South Korea, the Netherlands, Spain, and Denmark. He then spent a year in Taiwan as chargé d'affaires and then worked in Rome beginning in late 2002.

On August 17, 2006, Pope Benedict XVI appointed Green as titular archbishop of Altinum, apostolic nuncio to South Africa and Namibia, and apostolic delegate to Botswana.

Green was consecrated bishop on September 6, 2006, by Cardinal Secretary of State Angelo Sodano. That same day, Green was as appointed apostolic delegate to Lesotho. On September 23, 2006, he was appointed as apostolic delegate to Eswatini.

On October 15, 2011, Green was appointed as apostolic nuncio to Peru. On April 6, 2017, he became apostolic nuncio to Sweden and to Iceland; on June 13 to Denmark; on October 12 to Finland; and on October 18 to Norway.

Pope Francis accepted his resignation from his posts as nuncio on April 30, 2022.

== See also ==
- List of diplomatic missions of the Holy See

Diplomatic posts
| Preceded by Blasco Francisco Collaço | Apostolic Nuncio to South Africa; 2006–2011 | Succeeded by Mario Roberto Cassari |
| Preceded by Bruno Musarò | Apostolic Nuncio to Peru; 2011–2017 | Succeeded by Nicola Girasoli |
| Preceded by Henryk Józef Nowacki | Apostolic Nuncio to Sweden; 2017–2022 | Succeeded by Julio Murat |
