= Apostolic Nunciature to South Africa =

Diplomatic Mission of the Holy See in South Africa

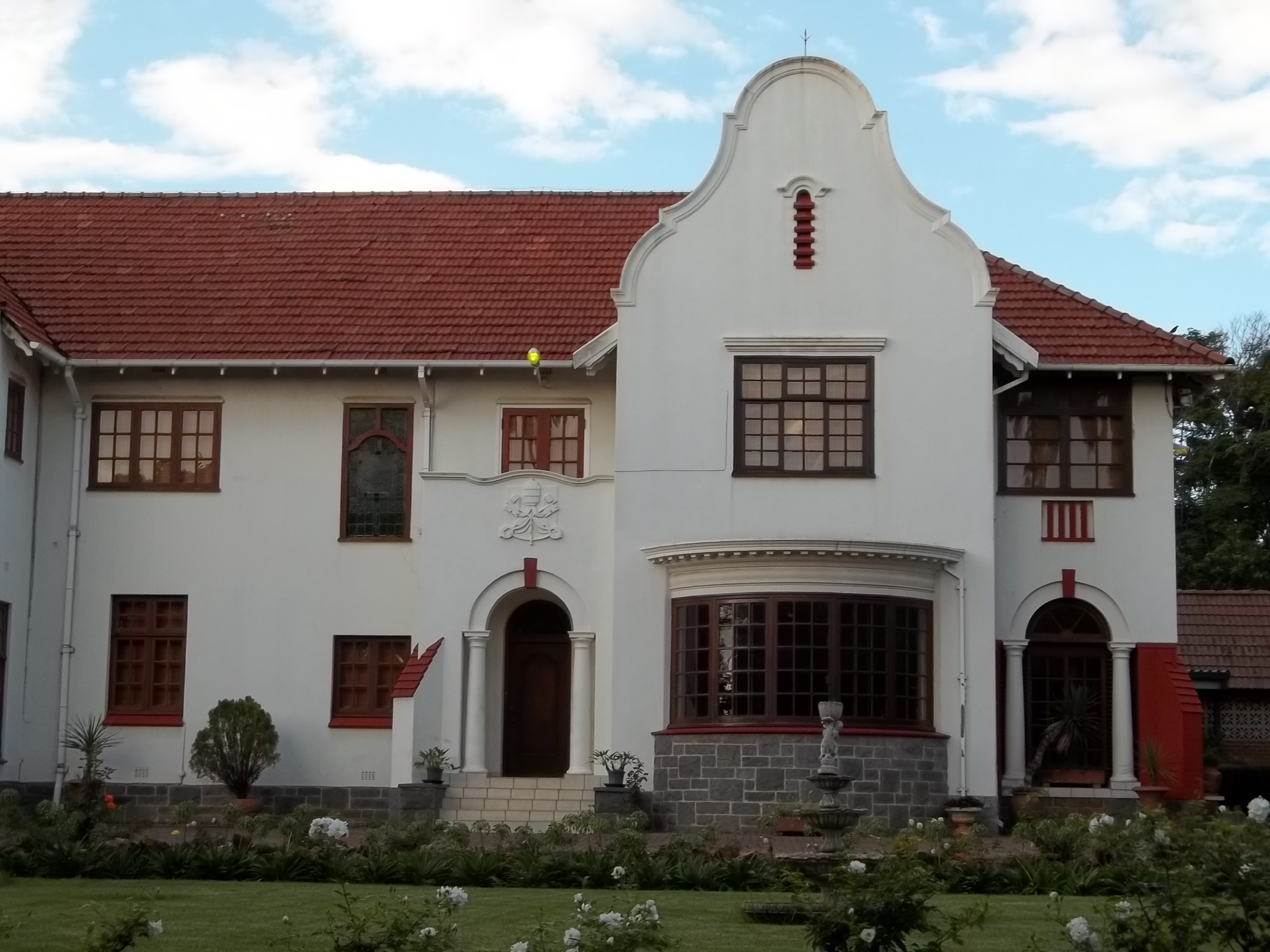
- Location: Pretoria, South Africa
- Address: 4 Argo Street, Waterkloof Ridge 0181, Waterkloof 0145, Pretoria, South Africa
- Coordinates: 25°47′04.5″S 28°13′47.2″E
- Apostolic Nuncio: Msgr. Henryk Mieczysław Jagodziński

The Apostolic Nunciature to South Africa the diplomatic mission of the Holy See to South Africa. It is located Pretoria. The current Apostolic Nuncio is Archbishop Henryk Jagodzinski, who was named to the position by Pope Francis on 9 February 2016.

The Apostolic Nunciature to the Republic of South Africa is an ecclesiastical office of the Catholic Church in South Africa, with the rank of an embassy. The nuncio serves both as the ambassador of the Holy See to the President of South Africa, and as delegate and point-of-contact between the Catholic hierarchy in South Africa and the Pope. The Apostolic Nuncio to South Africa is usually also the Apostolic Nuncio to Botswana, Eswatini, Lesotho and Namibia upon his appointment to said nations.

== History ==
It was established on 25 June 1994. Until then the Holy See maintained its representation through a series of delegations with increasingly narrow jurisdiction: the Delegation to Africa, the Delegation to Southern Africa, and the Delegation to South Africa.

== List of papal representatives to South Africa ==
Apostolic Delegates to Southern Africa

- Bernard Gijlswijk, O.P. (2 December 1922 – 22 December 1944 )
- Martin Lucas, S.V.D. (14 September 1945 – 3 December 1952 )
- Celestine Joseph Damiano (27 November 1952 – 24 January 1960 )
- Joseph Francis McGeough (17 September 1960 – 8 July 1967 )
- John Gordon (19 August 1967 – 1971 )
- Alfredo Poledrini (20 September 1971 – 18 September 1978 )
- Edward Idris Cassidy (25 March 1979 – 6 November 1984 )
- Joseph Mees (19 January 1985 – October 1987 )
- Ambrose Battista De Paoli (6 February 1988 – 24 June 1997 )

Apostolic Nuncios to South Africa

- Ambrose Battista De Paoli (25 June 1994 – 11 November 1997 )
- Manuel Monteiro de Castro (2 February 1998 – 1 March 2000 )
- Blasco Francisco Collaço (24 May 2000 – August 2006 )
- James Patrick Green (17 August 2006 – 15 October 2011)
- Mario Roberto Cassari (10 March 2012 – 22 May 2015)
- Peter Bryan Wells (9 February 2016 – 8 February 2023)
- Henryk Jagodziński (16 April 2024 – present)
