= Ambrose De Paoli =

American prelate

Ambrose Battista De Paoli
- Apostolic Nuncio to Australia
- Church: Catholic Church
- In office: December 18, 2004 – October 10, 2007
- Predecessor: Francesco Canalini
- Successor: Giuseppe Lazzarotto
- Other post: Titular Archbishop of Lares (1983-2007)
- Previous posts: Apostolic Nuncio to Japan (1997-2004); Apostolic Nuncio to Namibia (1995-1997); Apostolic Nuncio to South Africa (1994-1997); Apostolic Delegate to Botswana (1994-1997); Apostolic Nuncio to Swaziland (1993-1997); Apostolic Pro-Nuncio to Lesotho (1988-1997); Apostolic Delegate to Namibia (1994-1995); Apostolic Delegate to Southern Africa (1988-1994); Apostolic Pro-Nuncio (1983-1988)

Orders
- Ordination: December 18, 1960 by Martin John O'Connor
- Consecration: November 20, 1983 by Agostino Casaroli

Personal details
- Born: August 19, 1934 Jeannette, Pennsylvania, United States
- Died: October 10, 2007 (aged 73) Miami Beach, Florida, United States

Ambrose Battista De Paoli (August 19, 1934 – October 10, 2007) was an American prelate of the Catholic Church who worked in the diplomatic service of the Holy See.

== Biography ==
De Paoli was born in Jeannette, Pennsylvania and was ordained a priest on December 18, 1960, for the Archdiocese of Miami, Florida.

He earned a doctorate in canon law at the Pontifical Lateran University.

To prepare for a diplomatic career he entered the Pontifical Ecclesiastical Academy in 1964. He entered the diplomatic corps in 1966.

On September 23, 1983, Pope John Paul II named him a titular bishop and Apostolic Pro-Nuncio to Sri Lanka. He was consecrated a bishop on November 20, 1983, by Cardinal Agostino Casaroli.

On February 6, 1988, Pope John Paul appointed him Apostolic Delegate to Southern Africa and Apostolic Pro-Nuncio to Lesotho. He was then given additional titles as the Delegation to Southern Africa was transformed into country-specific missions, including Apostolic Nuncio to Swaziland on April 17, 1993; Apostolic Delegate to Namibia and to Botswana on March 5, 1994; and Apostolic Nuncio to South Africa on June 25, 1994.

On November 11, 1997, he was named nuncio to Japan.

On December 18, 2004, he was named nuncio to Australia.

He died from complications of leukemia in Miami Beach, Florida, on October 10, 2007.

== See also ==
- Apostolic Nuncio
- Peter Bryan Wells
