= Apostolic Nunciature to Namibia =

Diplomatic post of the Holy See

- Location: Namibia
- Ambassador: Apostolic Nuncio

The Apostolic Nunciature to Namibia is an ecclesiastical office of the Catholic Church in Namibia. It is a diplomatic post of the Holy See, whose representative is called the Apostolic Nuncio with the rank of an ambassador. The title Apostolic Nuncio to Namibia is held by the prelate appointed Apostolic Nuncio to South Africa; he resides in South Africa.

== List of papal representatives to Namibia ==
Apostolic Delegates

- Ambrose Battista De Paoli (5 March 1994 – 11 November 1997)

Apostolic Nuncios

- Manuel Monteiro de Castro (2 February 1998 – 1 March 2000)
- Blasco Francisco Collaço (24 May 2000 – August 2006)
- James Patrick Green (17 August 2006 – 15 October 2011)
- Mario Roberto Cassari (10 March 2012 – 22 May 2015)
- Peter Bryan Wells (13 February 2016 – 8 February 2023)
- Henryk Jagodziński (19 July 2024 – present)
