= Apostolic Nunciature to the Nordic countries =

Diplomatic post of the Holy See

The Holy See established what has evolved into its Apostolic Nunciature to the Nordic Countries on 16 March 1960 under the title Apostolic Delegation to Scandinavia with responsibility for representing the interests of the pope and the Catholic Church in Denmark, Finland, Iceland, Norway, and Sweden. It was originally located in Vedbæk, Denmark; since 2002 its office has been in Djursholm, Sweden, a suburb of Stockholm. The Holy See now has diplomatic relations with each of those countries and the Holy See appoints a nuncio, to date always the same person, to each of them.

The representative of the Holy See holds an ecclesiastical office, but the title varies according to the office's relationship to governments. The original title "Delegate" is used for an envoy whose relationship to the government has not received diplomatic statues. It usually evolves to Pro-Nuncio and then Nuncio as diplomatic relations are established and a formal agreement is reached between the Holy See and its counterpart. In the case of the Nordic Countries, the first Apostolic Delegate was appointed on 7 March 1960, though he had by then already, under the title "Apostolic Visitor", visited the reigning monarchs of Denmark, Norway, and Sweden, and announced plans to visit the president of Finland. The delegate received the additional titles Apostolic Pro-Nuncio to Finland on 16 February 1966 and Apostolic Pro-Nuncio to Iceland on 8 October 1976. On 2 October 1982 the Delegation was reorganized into country-specific nunciatures in anticipation of the establishment of diplomatic relations with each of them. All were first led by a Pro-Nuncio.

Since 1959, all the titles associated with the Nordic Countries, whatever their number, have been held by a single Vatican diplomat, though at times his appointment to all these offices have not occurred at the same time, as diplomatic assignments required the approval of the host country.

== List of papal representatives ==
- Martin Lucas (7 March 1960 – October 1961)
  - Apostolic Delegate to Scandinavia
- Bruno Bernard Heim (9 November 1961 – 7 May 1969)
  - Apostolic Delegate to Scandinavia
  - first Apostolic Pro-Nuncio to Finland as of 16 February 1966
- Josip Žabkar (17 May 1969 – 27 October 1981)
  - Apostolic Delegate to Scandinavia and Pro-Nuncio to Finland
  - first Apostolic Pro-Nuncio to Iceland as of 8 October 1976
- Luigi Bellotti (27 October 1981 – 2 October 1982)
  - originally Delegate to Scandinavia and Apostolic Pro-Nuncio to Finland and to Iceland
  - named Apostolic Pro-Nuncio to Denmark, Norway and Sweden on 2 October 1982
- Henri Lemaître (31 October 1985 – 28 March 1992)
  - named Apostolic Nuncio to all five countries simultaneously
- Giovanni Ceirano (20 August 1992 – 27 February 1999)
  - named Apostolic Nuncio to all five countries simultaneously
- Piero Biggio (27 February 1999 – 16 October 2004)
  - named Apostolic Nuncio to all five countries simultaneously
- Giovanni Tonucci (16 October 2004 – 18 October 2007)
  - named Apostolic Nuncio to all five countries simultaneously
- Emil Paul Tscherrig (26 January 2008 – 5 January 2012)
  - named Apostolic Nuncio to all five countries simultaneously
- Henryk Józef Nowacki
  - Apostolic Nuncio to Iceland and Sweden (28 June 2012 – 20 February 2017) (Note: He retired in February 2017 for health reasons after a private audience with Pope Francis.)
  - Apostolic Nuncio to Denmark, Finland, and Norway (6 October 2012 – 20 February 2017)
- James Patrick Green
  - Apostolic Nuncio to Iceland and Sweden (6 April 2017 – 30 April 2022)
  - Apostolic Nuncio to Denmark (13 June 2017 – 30 April 2022)
  - Apostolic Nuncio to Finland (12 October 2017 – 30 April 2022)
  - Apostolic Nuncio to Norway (18 October 2017 – 30 April 2022)
- Julio Murat
  - Apostolic Nuncio to Iceland and Sweden (9 November 2022 – present)
  - Apostolic Nuncio to Denmark (25 January 2023 – present)
  - Apostolic Nuncio to Finland (7 March 2023 – present)
  - Apostolic Nuncio to Norway (16 March 2023 – present)
