= Henryk Jagodziński (nuncio) =

Polish priest of the Catholic Church (born 1969)

His Excellency, The Most Reverend Henryk Jagodziński
- Apostolic Nuncio of South Africa, Eswatini, Lesotho, Namibia and Botswana; Titular Archbishop of Limosano
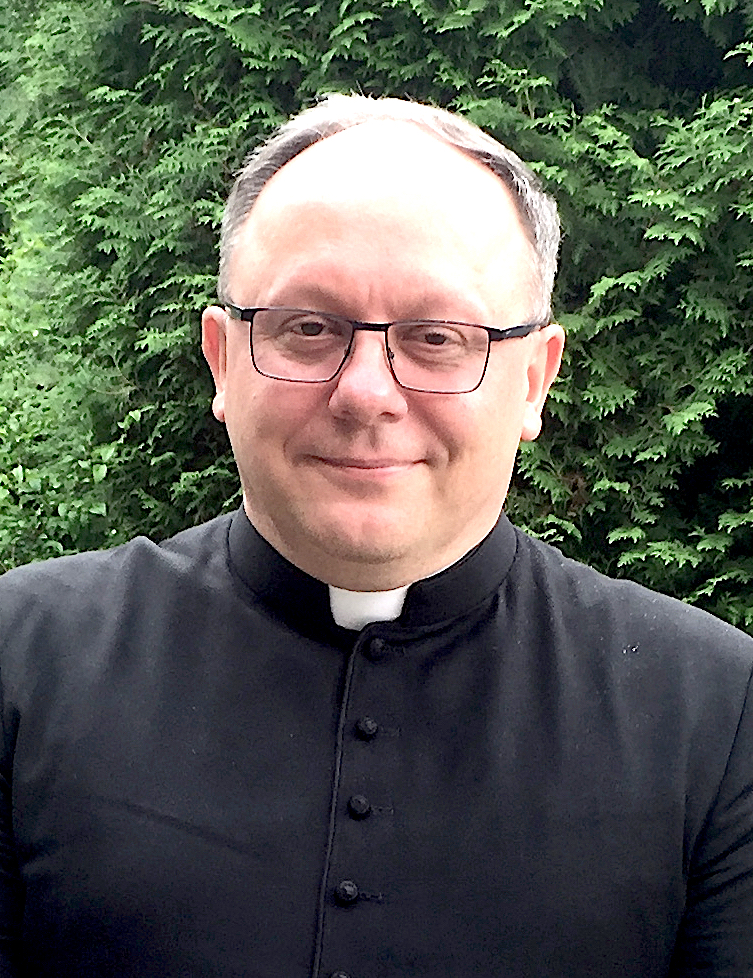
- Appointed: 16 April 2024
- Predecessor: Peter Bryan Wells
- Other post: Titular Archbishop of Limosano
- Previous post: Apostolic Nuncio to Ghana (2020-2024)

Orders
- Ordination: 3 June 1995 by Kazimierz Ryczan
- Consecration: 18 July 2020 by Jan Romeo Pawłowski, Salvatore Pennacchio, and Jan Piotrowski

Personal details
- Born: January 1, 1969 (age 57) Małogoszcz, Poland
- Motto: In Fines Orbis

Styles of Henryk Jagodziński
- Reference style: His Excellency; The Most Reverend
- Spoken style: Your Excellency
- Religious style: Archbishop

Henryk Mieczysław Jagodziński (born 1 January 1969) is a Polish priest of the Catholic Church who works in the diplomatic service of the Holy See.

== Biography ==
Henryk Jagodziński was born in Małogoszcz, Poland, on 1 January 1969. He attended the Higher Theological Seminary in Kielce. He was ordained a priest of the Diocese of Kielce on 3 June 1995 by Bishop Kazimierz Ryczan. He holds a degree in canon law. He did parish work in Busko-Zdrój for two years and then studied in Rome, earning a doctorate in canon law at the Pontifical University of the Holy Cross. He also studied at the Vatican training institute for diplomats, the Pontifical Ecclesiastical Academy.

== Diplomatic career ==
He entered the diplomatic service of the Holy See on 1 July 2001. His early assignments included stints in the offices representing the Holy See in Belarus from 2001 to 2005, Croatia from 2005 to 2008, in the Section for Relations with States of the Secretariat of State in Rome, and India from 2015 to 2018, and Bosnia and Herzegovina from 2018 to 2020.

On 3 May 2020, Pope Francis appointed him titular archbishop of Limosano and Apostolic Nuncio to Ghana.

On 16 April 2024, Pope Francis appointed him as nuncio to South Africa and Lesotho.

On 19 July 2024, his duties were extended to include Eswatini and Namibia.

On 20 August 2024, his duties were extended to include Botswana.

He is the author of scholarly articles that have appeared in Kieleckie Studia Teologiczne (Kielce Theological Studies). Among his books is a personal testament: Wiara kapłana (A Priest's Faith) (2014).

== See also ==
- List of heads of the diplomatic missions of the Holy See
