= Henryk Józef Nowacki =

Polish prelate of the Catholic Church (born 1946)

His Excellency, The Most Reverend Henryk Józef Nowacki
- Apostolic Nuncio Emeritus to Sweden, Denmark, Finland, Iceland and Norway; Titular Archbishop of Blera
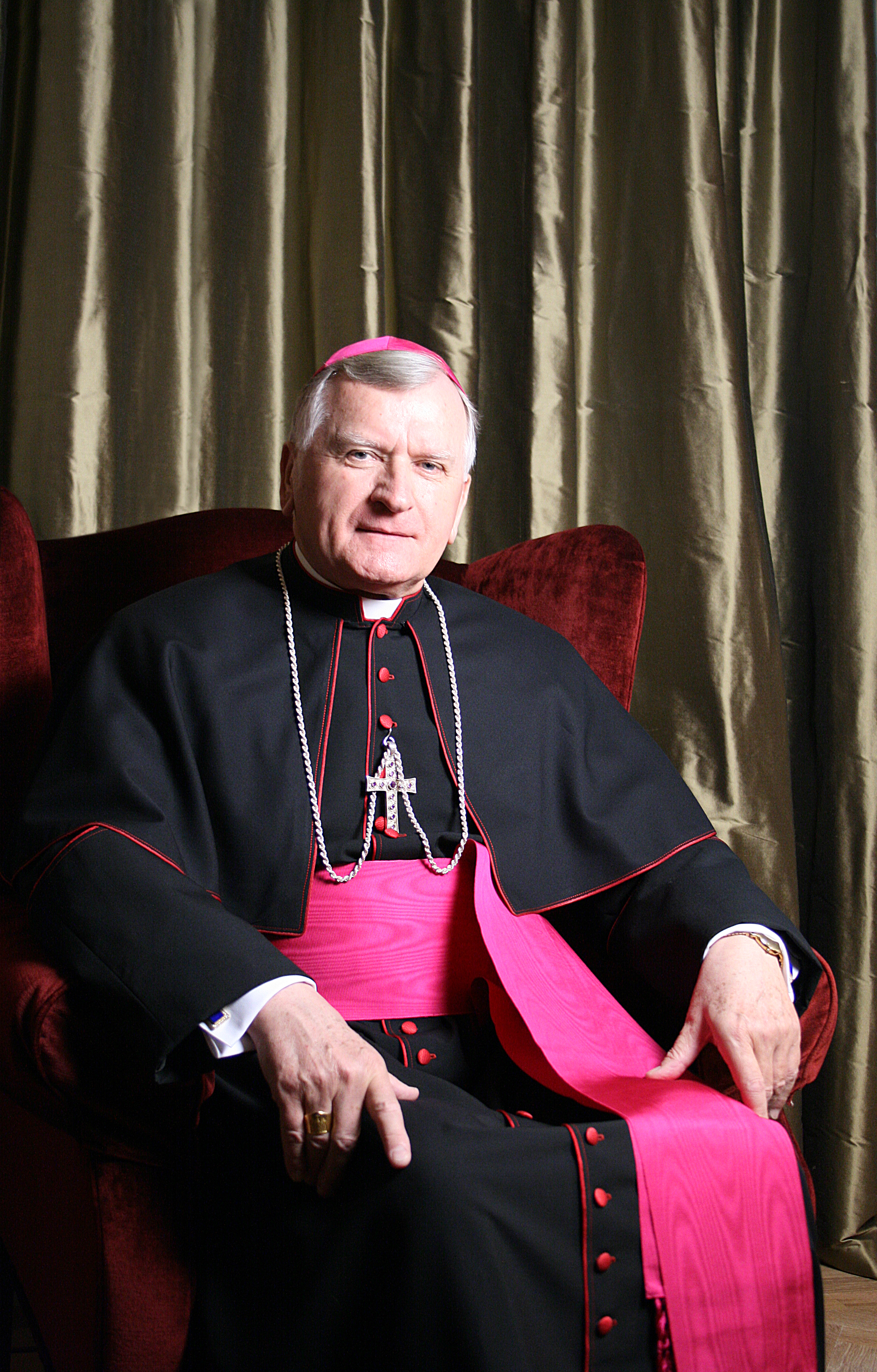
- Archbishop Henryk Józef Nowacki
- Appointed: 28 June 2012
- Retired: 20 February 2017
- Predecessor: Emil Paul Tscherrig
- Successor: James Patrick Green
- Other post: Titular Archbishop of Blera
- Previous posts: Apostolic Nuncio to Nicaragua (2007-2012); Apostolic Nuncio to Slovakia (2001-2007)

Orders
- Ordination: 31 May 1970 by Jerzy Karol Ablewicz
- Consecration: 19 March 2001 by John Paul II, Angelo Sodano, and Giovanni Battista Re

Personal details
- Born: 11 August 1946 (age 80) Gunzenhausen, Germany
- Motto: FORTES FIDE
- Coat of arms: Henryk Józef Nowacki's coat of arms

Styles of Henryk Józef Nowacki
- Reference style: His Excellency; The Most Reverend
- Spoken style: Your Excellency
- Religious style: Archbishop

Henryk Józef Nowacki (born 11 August 1946) is a Polish prelate of the Catholic Church who has spent his career in the diplomatic service of the Holy See.

== Biography ==
Nowacki was born on 11 August 1946 in Gunzenhausen. He was ordained a priest on 31 May 1970 by Jerzy Karol Ablewicz, Bishop of Tarnów.

== Diplomatic career ==
On 8 February 2001, Pope John Paul II appointed him titular archbishop of Blera and Apostolic Nuncio to Slovakia. He received his episcopal consecration from John Paul II on 19 March. On 28 November 2007, Pope Benedict XVI named him Apostolic Nuncio to Nicaragua.

Benedict appointed him Apostolic Nuncio in Sweden and Iceland on 28 June 2012. On 6 October 2012 Nowacki was named Apostolic Nuncio in Denmark, Finland and Norway as well.

He retired in February 2017 for health reasons after a private audience with Pope Francis.

== See also ==
- List of heads of the diplomatic missions of the Holy See
