= Octava =

Octava was a city and bishopric in Numidia. It is a Roman Catholic titular see.

== History ==
Giru Marcelli, located in present Algeria, was among the many town in the Roman province of Numidia which were important enough to become a suffragan diocese in the papal sway, but faded completely during the 6th century advent of Islam.

Its only historically documented bishops were :

- Victor, partaking in a council held in 256 at Carthage by its bishop Saint Cyprianus on the 'lapsed Christians' who accepted forced pagan sacrificing to avoid martyrdom.
- Pascentius, who participated in the synod called at Carthage by Hunerik of the Vandal Kingdom in 484, whereafter he was exiled, like most Catholic incumbents, unlike their Donatist heretic counterparts.

== Titular see ==
The diocese was nominally restored in 1933 as Titular bishopric of Octava (Latin) / Ottava (Curiate Italian) / Octaven(sis) (Latin) (Latin adjective).

It has had the following incumbents, of the fitting Episcopal (lowest) rank, with archiepiscopal exceptions :

- Titular Archbishop: Emile Maurice Guerry (1966.02.15 – death 1969.03.11) as emeritate; previously Titular Archbishop of Acrida (1940.05.31 – 1952.12.02) as Coadjutor Archbishop of Cambrai (France) (1940.05.31 – 1952.12.02), succeeding as Metropolitan Archbishop of Cambrai (1952.12.02 – 1966.02.15)
- Ignazio Cannavò (1970.10.31 – 1977.06.03), first as Auxiliary Bishop of Diocese of Acireale (Italy) (1970.10.31 – 1976.02.21), then as Coadjutor Archbishop of Messina (Sicily, Italy) (1976.02.21 – 1977.06.03); later Bishop-Prelate of Territorial Prelature of Santa Lucia del Mela (Italy) (1976.12.20 – 1986.09.30), Metropolitan Archbishop of Messina (Italy) (1977.06.03 – 1986.09.30) and (Archbishop-)Bishop of Lipari (Italy) (1977.12.10 – 1986.09.30), Metropolitan Archbishop of Messina-Lipari-Santa Lucia del Mela (Italy) (1986.09.30 – retired 1997.05.17), died 2015
- Titular Archbishop: Blasco Francisco Collaço (born colonial India) (1977.09.23 – ...) as papal diplomat : Apostolic Nuncio (ambassador) to Panama (1977.09.23 – 1982.07.26), Apostolic Nuncio to Dominican Republic (1982.07.26 – 1991.02.28), Apostolic Delegate to Puerto Rico (1982.07.26 – 1991.02.28), Apostolic Pro-Nuncio to Madagascar (1991.02.28 – 1996.04.13), Apostolic Pro-Nuncio to Mauritius (1991.02.28 – 1996.04.13), Apostolic Nuncio to Seychelles (1994.05.14 – 1996.04.13), Apostolic Nuncio to Bulgaria (1996.04.13 – 2000.05.24), Apostolic Nuncio to Namibia (2000.05.24 – 2006.08.17), Apostolic Nuncio to South Africa (2000.05.24 – 2006.08.17), Apostolic Delegate to Botswana (2000.05.24 – 2006.08.17), Apostolic Nuncio to Lesotho (2000.06.24 – 2006.08.17), Apostolic Nuncio to Swaziland (2000.06.24 – 2006.08.17), and on emeritate (2006.08.17 - ...).

== See also ==
- List of Catholic dioceses in Algeria

== Sources and external links ==
- GCatholic

Bibliography

- Pius Bonifacius Gams, Series episcoporum Ecclesiae Catholicae, Leipzig 1931, p. 467
- Stefano Antonio Morcelli, Africa christiana, Volume I, Brescia 1816, p. 249
