= Giovanni Ceirano (nuncio) =

Italian prelate

Giovanni Ceirano (20 July 1927 – 30 January 2006) was an Italian prelate of the Catholic Church who worked in the diplomatic service of the Holy See. He became an archbishop in 1990 and served as Apostolic Nuncio from 1990 to 1999.

== Biography ==
Giovanni Ceirano was born in Lagnasco, Italy, on 20 July 1927. He was ordained a priest on 1 July 1951. He earned a doctorate in civil and canon law at the Pontifical Lateran University.

To prepare for a diplomatic career he entered the Pontifical Ecclesiastical Academy in 1954. He joined the diplomatic service of the Holy See in 1956. His assignments included stints in Bolivia, Haiti, Austria, Scandinavia, South Africa, Congo, and Tanzania. He worked in the Vatican Mission in Jerusalem and in Bonn.

He was named Permanent Representative of the Holy See at the IAEA and Permanent Observer at UNIDO on 3 March 1983.

On 21 December 1989, Pope John Paul II appointed him titular archbishop of Tagase and Apostolic Pro-Nuncio to Papua New Guinea. He received his episcopal consecration on 6 January 1990 from Pope John Paul. He received the additional responsibility of Apostolic Pro-Nuncio to the Solomon Islands on 15 January 1990.

On 20 August 1992, he was named Apostolic Nuncio to Denmark, Finland, Iceland, Sweden, and Norway.

He was replaced in those positions by Piero Biggio on 27 February 1999. He retired to Lagnasco.

Ceirano died on 29 January 2006.
