= Ceirano =

Ceirano may refer to:

- Ceirano (surname), surname

== Organisations ==
Ceirano is the name associated with several Italian automobile companies founded by brothers Ceirano:

- Ceirano GB & C (Ceirano & C.), founded in 1898 by Giovanni Battista and Matteo Ceirano, and was key to the founding of the F.I.A.T. industrial group in 1899
- Fratelli Ceirano (Fratelli Ceirano & C.), founded in 1901 by Giovanni Battista and Matteo Ceirano.
- Itala (Itala Fabbrica Automobili), founded in 1903 by Matteo Ceirano.
- Ceirano Junior & C, a.k.a. Junior F.J.T.A. was founded in 1904 by Giovanni Ceirano.
- Società Piemontese Automobili S.P.A. (SPA), founded in 1906 by Matteo Ceirano and Michele Ansaldi.
- SCAT (Società Automobili Torino Ceirano), founded in 1906 by Giovanni Ceirano
- Ceirano Fabbrica Automobili or Giovanni Ceirano Fabbrica Automobili, founded in 1917 by Giovanni and his son Giovanni "Ernesto" (used the brand Ceirano)
- SCAT-Ceirano, formed in 1923 from the merger of S.C.A.T. and Ceirano Fabrica Automobili
- Fabrica Anonima Torinese Automobili (FATA) - See Aurea, taken over by Giovanni and his son Giovanni "Ernesto"

== See also ==
- List of automobile companies founded by the Ceirano brothers
