= Piero Biggio =

Italian prelate

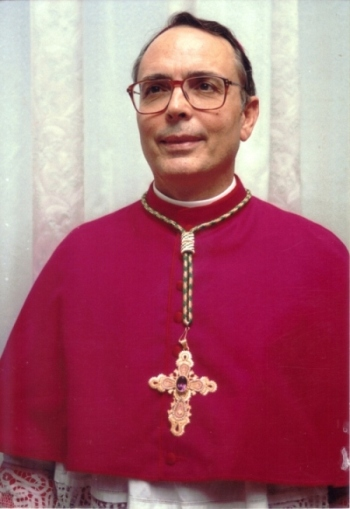
Piero Biggio

Piero Biggio (29 June 1937 – 18 April 2007) was an Italian prelate of the Catholic Church who worked in the diplomatic service of the Holy See.

== Biography ==
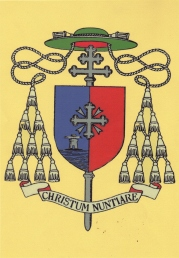
Episcopal Crest

Piero Biggio was born on 29 June 1937 in Calasetta, Province of Carbonia-Iglesias, Sardinia, Italy. He was ordained a priest on 5 August 1962.

In 1968, he obtained a Licentiate of Canon Law at the Pontifical Lateran University and then completed the two-year program at the Pontifical Ecclesiastical Academy from 1968 to 1970.

In 1970 he entered the diplomatic service of the Holy See. His first assignment was in the Apostolic Nunciature in Panama. Other postings followed in Chile, Zambia, Australia, Switzerland and Taiwan.

On 10 December 1988, Pope John Paul II appointed him titular archbishop of Otriculum and Apostolic Nuncio to Bangladesh. He received his episcopal consecration from the Secretary of State Cardinal Agostino Casaroli on 25 February 1989. Biggio was apostolic nuncio in Chile from 1992 to 1999. In that role he advised against prosecuting former Chilean dictator Augusto Pinochet for crimes against humanity, suggesting he be given diplomatic immunity, pardoned and prayed for. He called Pinochet's arrest by British authorities on a Spanish warrant a "violation of diplomatic immunity".

He was nuncio in Denmark, Iceland, Finland, Norway and Sweden from his appointment on 27 February 1999 until John Paul accepted his resignation on 16 October 2004.

His last years were spent working in Rome in the offices of the Secretariat of State. He died after a long illness on 18 April 2007.
