= Alfredo Poledrini =

Italian prelate

Alfredo Poledrini (30 June 1914 – 23 April 1980) was an Italian prelate of the Catholic Church who worked in the diplomatic service of the Holy See. He became an archbishop in 1965 and served as Apostolic Nuncio to several countries in Africa.

== Biography ==
Alfredo Poledrini was born on 30 June 1914 in Genoa, Italy. He was ordained a priest on 27 March 1937.

To prepare for a diplomatic career he entered the Pontifical Ecclesiastical Academy in 1945.

On 27 October 1965, Pope Paul VI named him titular archbishop of Vazari and Apostolic Pro-Nuncio to Zambia.

He received his episcopal consecration in 5 December 1965 from Cardinal Amleto Cicognani.

On 21 May 1966, Pope Paul gave him the additional responsibility of Apostolic Pro-Nuncio to Malawi.

On 20 September 1971, Pope Paul named him Apostolic Pro-Nuncio to Lesotho and Apostolic Delegate to Southern Africa.

He resigned from both those positions on 18 September 1978 at the age of 64.

He died on 23 April 1980 at the age of 65.
