= Peter Bryan Wells =

American Catholic prelate (born 1963)

His Excellency, The Most Reverend Peter Bryan Wells
- Apostolic Nuncio to Thailand; and Cambodia; Apostolic Delegate to Laos
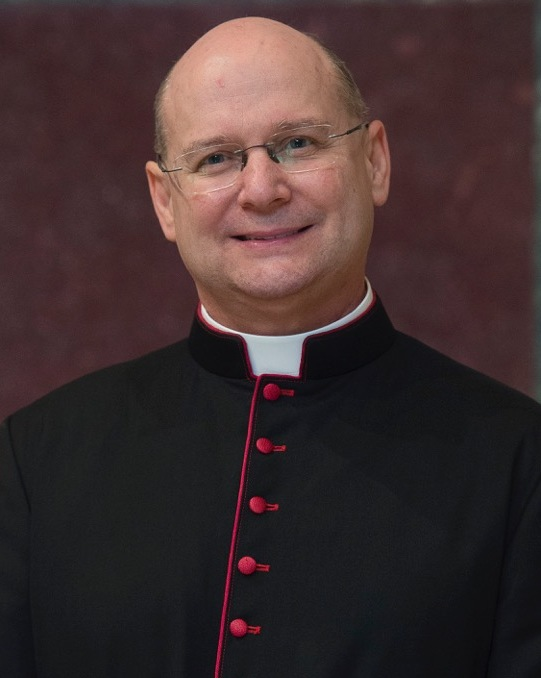
- Official portrait, 2017
- Church: Catholic Church; Latin Church
- Appointed: 8 February 2023
- Predecessor: Paul Tschang In-Nam
- Other post: Titular Archbishop of Marcianopolis (2016‍–‍present)
- Previous posts: Assessor for General Affairs of the Secretariat of State (2009‍–‍2016); Apostolic Nuncio to South Africa, Botswana, Namibia, Lesotho, and Eswatini (2016‍–‍2023)

Orders
- Ordination: July 12, 1991 by Eusebius J. Beltran
- Consecration: March 19, 2016 by Pope Francis, Fernando Filoni and Giovanni Angelo Becciu

Personal details
- Born: May 12, 1963 (age 63) Tulsa, Oklahoma, US
- Education: St. Meinrad Seminary College; Pontifical North American College; Pontifical Gregorian University; John Paul II Pontifical Theological Institute for Studies on Marriage and Family; Pontifical Ecclesiastical Academy
- Motto: Misericordia et spes (Latin for 'Mercy and hope')
- Styles
- Reference style: His Excellency; The Most Reverend
- Spoken style: Your Excellency
- Religious style: Archbishop

Peter Bryan Wells (born May 12, 1963) is an American Catholic prelate who has spent most of his career in the diplomatic service of the Holy See. He has worked in Rome in the administration of the Secretariat of State and in foreign postings. He has been an archbishop and a nuncio since 2016.

== Biography ==
=== Early years ===
Wells was born on May 12, 1963, the first of five children in Tulsa, Oklahoma. He completed his studies in philosophy at St. Meinrad Seminary College in Indiana. He completed his studies in theology at the Pontifical North American College in Rome. In 1990, he obtained a Bachelor of Theology degree from the Pontifical Gregorian University.

=== Priesthood ===
Wells was ordained a priest at Holy Family Cathedral in Tulsa by Bishop Eusebius Joseph Beltran on July 12, 1991, for the Diocese of Tulsa. After his ordination, the diocese assigned Wells as a curate at Holy Family Cathedral Parish, as special secretary to the bishop of Tulsa, and vicar for religious education in the diocese. He soon returned to Rome, receiving a Licentiate of Theology at the John Paul II Pontifical Theological Institute for Studies on Marriage and Family in 1992. In 1998 and 1999, Wells received a Licentiate of Canon Law and a Doctor of Canon Law degree from the Gregorian University. At the same time, he was a student at the Pontifical Ecclesiastical Academy in Rome.

== Diplomatic service ==
=== Early positions ===
Wells entered the diplomatic service of the Holy See on July 1, 1999, working in the Apostolic Nunciature to Nigeria and, beginning in 2002, in the Section for General Affairs of the Secretariat of State. He was appointed to head the English-language desk in 2006. Besides his native English, Wells speaks Italian, French, German and Spanish.

Wells was named assessor on July 16, 2009. Speaking about his work as assessor of general affairs, Wells said that the role of papal diplomacy was to allow Pope Francis and his representatives to "have the ability to act freely in the world" and not be "impeded in their ministry", especially in reaching out to the most marginalized.

Francis named Wells secretary of the five-member Pontifical commission that was responsible for investigating the Institute for the Works of Religion in 2013. (Note: Other members of the commission included Cardinal Raffaele Farina as commission president, Bishop Juan Ignacio Arrieta Ochoa de Chinchetru, who served as the coordinator, and Mary Ann Glendon.) Wells also served as president of the Holy See's Financial Security Committee.

=== Apostolic nuncio ===
On February 9, 2016, Wells was appointed Apostolic Nuncio to South Africa and Botswana and titular archbishop of Marcianopolis. On February 13, he was also named apostolic nuncio to Lesotho and Namibia.

Wells was consecrated an archbishop at St. Peter's Basilica in Rome on March 19, 2016 by Francis. On June 13, 2016, Wells was also appointed apostolic nuncio to Eswatini. On February 8, 2023, Francis appointed him as nuncio to Thailand and Cambodia and apostolic delegate to Laos.

== See also ==
- List of heads of the diplomatic missions of the Holy See

== Notes ==
Catholic Church titles
Preceded by Gabriele Giordano Caccia	Assessor for General Affairs of the Secretariat of State; July 16, 2009 – February 9, 2016	Succeeded by Paolo Borgia
Diplomatic posts
Preceded by Mario Roberto Cassari	Apostolic Nuncio to South Africa; February 9, 2016 – February 8, 2023	Succeeded by vacant
Preceded by Mario Roberto Cassari	Apostolic Nuncio to Botswana; February 9, 2016 – February 8, 2023	Succeeded by vacant
Preceded by Mario Roberto Cassari	Apostolic Nuncio to Lesotho; February 13, 2016 – February 8, 2023	Succeeded by vacant
Preceded by Mario Roberto Cassari	Apostolic Nuncio to Namibia; February 13, 2016 – February 8, 2023	Succeeded by vacant
Preceded by Mario Roberto Cassari	Apostolic Nuncio to Eswatini; June 13, 2016 – February 8, 2023	Succeeded by vacant
Preceded by Paul Tschang In-Nam	Apostolic Nuncio to Thailand; February 8, 2023 – present	Succeeded by Incumbent
Preceded by Paul Tschang In-Nam	Apostolic Nuncio to Cambodia; February 8, 2023 – present	Succeeded by Incumbent
Preceded by Paul Tschang In-Nam	Apostolic Delegate to Laos; February 8, 2023 – present	Succeeded by Incumbent
