= Jean-Marie Villot =

Roman Catholic cardinal

His Eminence Jean-Marie Villot
- Cardinal Secretary of State
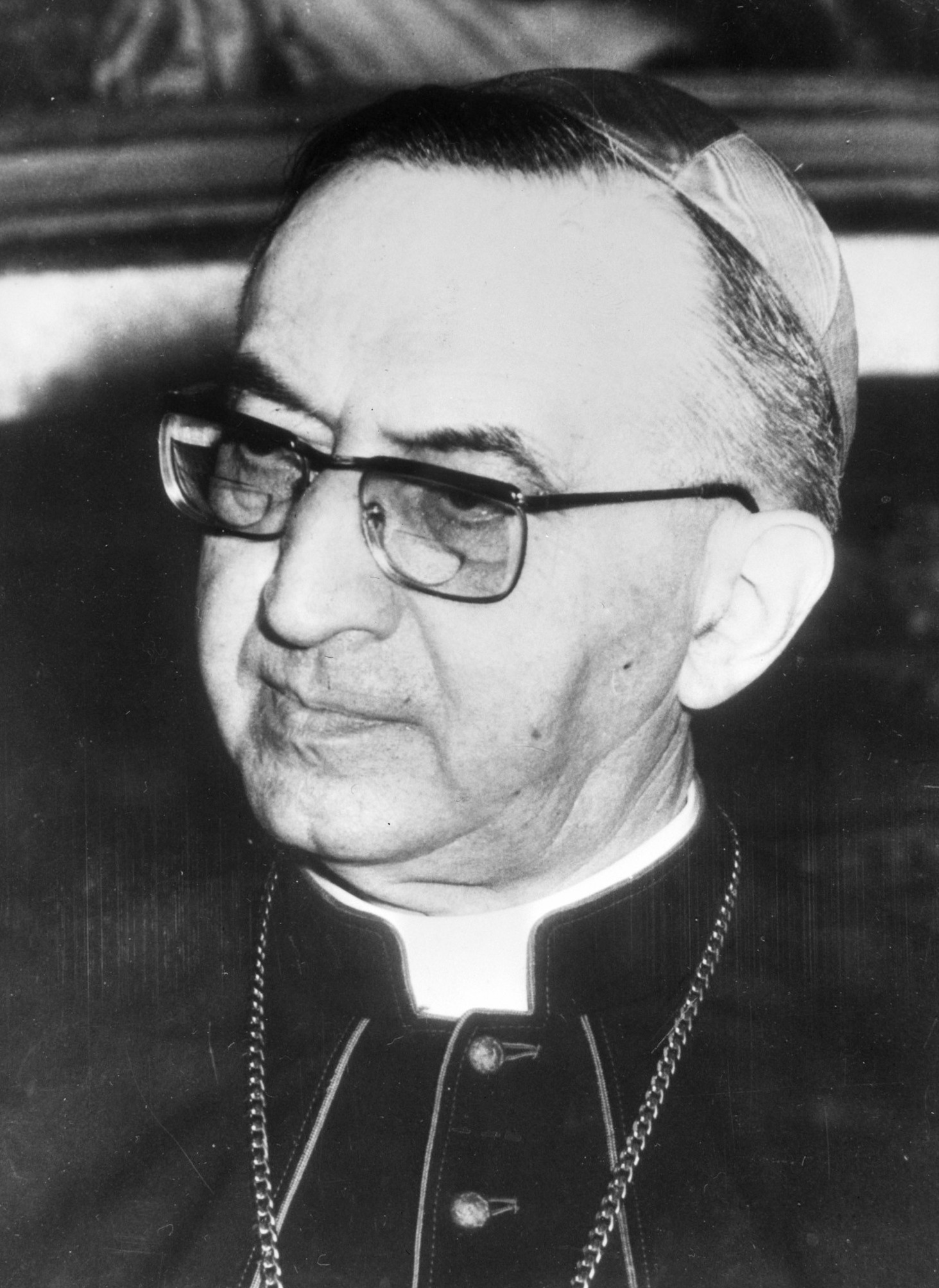
- Villot in 1978
- See: Frascati
- Appointed: 2 May 1969
- Term ended: 9 March 1979
- Predecessor: Amleto Giovanni Cicognani
- Successor: Agostino Casaroli
- Other posts: Cardinal-Bishop of Frascati; Camerlengo of the Apostolic Chamber
- Previous posts: Auxiliary Bishop of Paris (1954–1959); Titular Bishop of Vinda (1954–1959); Coadjutor Archbishop of Lyon-Vienne (1959–1965); Titular Archbishop of Bosporus (1959–1965); Archbishop of Lyon-Vienne (1965–1967); Cardinal-Priest of Santissima Trinità al Monte Pincio (1965–1974); Prefect of the Congregation of the Council (1967–1969); President of the Pontifical Council “Cor Unum” (1971–1978)

Orders
- Ordination: 19 April 1930 by Alfred-Henri-Marie Baudrillart
- Consecration: 12 October 1954 by Maurice Feltin
- Created cardinal: 22 February 1965 by Pope Paul VI
- Rank: Cardinal-Bishop

Personal details
- Born: 11 October 1905 Saint-Amant-Tallende, Puy-de-Dôme, France
- Died: 9 March 1979 (aged 73) Vatican City
- Motto: auxilium a domino
- Coat of arms: Jean-Marie Villot's coat of arms

Jean-Marie Villot (French: [ʒɑ̃ maʁi vijo]; 11 October 1905 – 9 March 1979) was a French prelate and Cardinal of the Roman Catholic Church who served as Archbishop of Lyon from 1965 to 1967, Prefect of the Congregation for the Clergy from 1967 to 1969, Vatican Secretary of State from 1969 to 1979, and Camerlengo of the Holy Roman Church from 1970 to 1979. He was made a cardinal in 1965.

== Early life ==
He was born on 11 October 1905 in Saint-Amant-Tallende, Puy-de-Dôme, to Joseph and Marie (née Laville) Villot; he was an only child. Before completing his military service on 2 August 1924, he studied for the priesthood in Riom, Clermont, and Lyon. Clermont, and Lyon. He became a Marist novice on 7 September 1925, but left the order three months later. He then studied at the Catholic Institute of Paris and the Pontifical Athenaeum Angelicum in Rome, where he earned a licentiate in canon law and a doctorate in sacred theology in 1934 with a thesis entitled Le pape Nicolas II et le décret de 1059 sur l'élection pontificale.

== Priesthood ==
He was ordained a priest of the Archdiocese of Paris on 19 April 1930 by Archbishop Alfred-Henri-Marie Baudrillart, rector of the Institut Catholique. From 1931 to 1934, he served as secretary to Pierre-Marie Gerlier, Bishop of Tarbes-et-Lourdes. He taught at the Clermont seminary and the Catholic University in Lyon, serving as vice-rector of the latter from 1942 to 1950. At the start of 1950 he was incardinated into the Archdiocese of Lyon.

== Bishop ==
Coat of arms of Cardinal Villot during the vacancies of the papacy in 1978

Pope Pius XII appointed Villot auxiliary bishop of Paris and titular bishop of Vinda on 2 September 1954. He received his episcopal consecration on 12 October from Cardinal Maurice Feltin, with Archbishop Emile Guerry of Cambrai and Bishop Pierre de la Chanonie of Clermont as co-consecrators.

On 17 December 1959, he was named Coadjutor Archbishop of Lyon and titular archbishop of Bosporus. He succeeded Cardinal Gerlier as Archbishop of Lyon on 17 January 1965.

During the Second Vatican Council, he served as one of several of the council's undersecretaries, where his performance impressed Pope Paul VI.

== Cardinal ==
Styles of Jean-Marie Villot
- Reference style: His Eminence
- Spoken style: Your Eminence
- Religious style: Monsignor
- Informal style: Cardinal
- See: Lyon

On 22 February 1965, he was created Cardinal-Priest of SS. Trinità al Monte Pincio by Pope Paul VI.

He was named Prefect of the Congregation of the Council (later renamed the Congregation for the Clergy) on 7 April 1967. Two years later, on 2 May 1969, he was named Cardinal Secretary of State as part of Pope Paul's program to internationalize the Roman Curia. Though Villot told reporters "I have long been a Roman at heart", his appointment was resented by the Italians though without public conflict. Pope Paul underscored his stance by adding to Villot's portfolio in May 1969, naming him head of the Section if the Secretariat of State responsible for foreign affairs, expanding his control over broader curia by making him President of the Pontifical Commission for Vatican City State and of the Administration of the Patrimony of the Apostolic See.

Villot was named Camerlengo of the Holy Roman Church on 16 October 1970, the first non-Italian to hold the office in half a millennium, a further testament of Pope Paul's insistence on expanding the role of non-Italians at the highest levels of the Vatican bureaucracy. On 15 July 1971, he was appointed President of the newly formed Pontifical Council Cor Unum, a position he resigned on 4 September 1978, during the brief pontificate of Pope John Paul I.

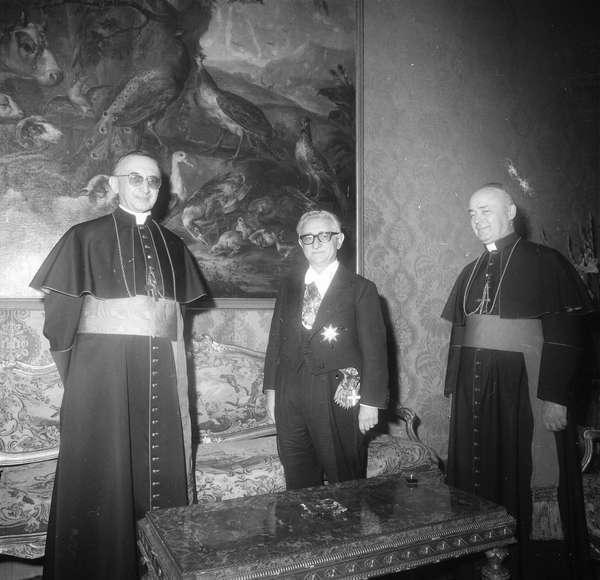
Cardinal Villot with Giovanni Leone in the Quirinal Palace in September 1972

Pope Paul elevated him to Cardinal Bishop of Frascati on 12 December 1974. Villot was present at the death of Paul VI in Castel Gandolfo on 6 August 1978.

Pope John Paul I retained Villot as Secretary of State. When Pope John Paul II announced that he would retain Villot as Secretary of State, he made clear the appointment was short-term but also confirmed Villot in his other positions. He noted that Villot himself had suggested that the first non-Italian pope in centuries might want an Italian as his Secretary of State. He remained in office until his death in March 1979.

Villot participated as a cardinal elector in both the August and October conclaves of 1978, which elected John Paul I and John Paul II respectively, and presided at the conclaves because he was the senior cardinal bishop in attendance. As Camerlengo he acted as the interim administrator of the Holy See in the interregnums of 1978.

== Death ==
Villot died at age 73 from bronchial pneumonia on 9 March 1979, in his Vatican City apartment, the day he returned from a four-day hospital stay. John Paul II celebrated his funeral Mass in St. Peter's Basilica on 13 March, and his remains were buried in the crypt of Ss. Trinità al Monte Pincio.

== Personal life ==
Villot was one of the people accused on the so-called Pecorelli list, alleging membership in Freemasonry of 121 men associated with the Vatican, where he is listed with the code name “JEANNI”, supposedly initiated on 6 August 1966. This list was named for the Italian journalist Carmine Pecorelli (himself a member of Propaganda Due, assassinated in 1979), who published it in his journal Osservatore Politico in 1978, but it had also been published elsewhere in Panorama two years earlier.

== Bibliography ==
- Agnoli, Carlo Alberto (1996). La massoneria alla conquista della Chiesa. EILIES. ISBN 8871300181.
- Wenger, Antoine, Le cardinal Jean Villot 1905-1979: Secretaire d'état de trois papes, Desclée de Brouwere, Paris, 1989 ISBN 2-220-03063-6

Catholic Church titles
Preceded by Pierre-Marie Gerlier	Archbishop of Lyon; 17 January 1965 – 7 April 1967	Succeeded by Alexandre Renard
Preceded by Pietro Ciriaci	Prefect of the Congregation for the Clergy; 7 April 1967 – 2 May 1969	Succeeded by John Joseph Wright
Preceded by Benedetto Aloisi Masella	Camerlengo; 16 October 1970 – 9 March 1979	Succeeded by Paolo Bertoli
Preceded by none	President of the Pontifical Council Cor Unum; 15 July 1971 – 4 September 1978	Succeeded by Bernardin Gantin
Political offices
Preceded by Amleto Giovanni Cicognani	Cardinal Secretary of State; 2 May 1969 – 9 March 1979	Succeeded by Agostino Casaroli
