= Agostino Casaroli =

Catholic cardinal and diplomat

His Eminence Agostino Casaroli
- Cardinal Secretary of State
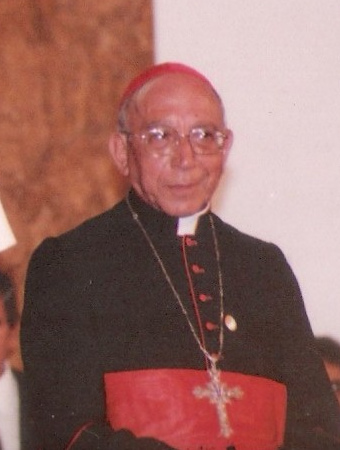
- Casaroli in 1986
- See: Porto-Santa Rufina
- Appointed: 1 July 1979
- Term ended: 1 December 1990
- Predecessor: Jean-Marie Villot
- Successor: Angelo Sodano
- Other posts: Cardinal-Bishop of Porto-Santa Rufina; Cardinal-Priest of Santi XII Apostoli
- Previous posts: Secretary of the Congregation for Extraordinary Ecclesiastical Affairs (1967–1968); Titular Archbishop of Carthage (1967–1979); Pro-Secretary of the Secretariat of State (1979); President of the Pontifical Commission for Vatican City State (1979–1984); President of the Administration of the Patrimony of the Apostolic See (1979–1982)

Orders
- Ordination: 27 May 1937
- Consecration: 16 July 1967 by Pope Paul VI
- Created cardinal: 30 June 1979 by John Paul II
- Rank: Cardinal-Bishop

Personal details
- Born: 24 November 1914 Castel San Giovanni, Italy
- Died: 9 June 1998 (aged 83) Vatican City
- Denomination: Roman Catholic
- Motto: Pro fide et justitia
- Coat of arms

Styles of Agostino Casaroli
- Reference style: His Eminence
- Spoken style: Your Eminence
- Informal style: Cardinal
- See: Porto-Santa-Rufina (suburbicarian)

Agostino Casaroli (24 November 1914 – 9 June 1998) was an Italian Catholic priest and diplomat for the Holy See, who became Cardinal Secretary of State. He was an important figure behind the Vatican's efforts to deal with the religious persecution of the Church in the nations of the Soviet bloc after the Second Vatican Council.

== Biography ==
Casaroli was born in Castel San Giovanni in the province of Piacenza, Italy, to a family of humble roots. His father was a tailor in Piacenza. He was educated at the Collegio Alberoni in Piacenza; the Episcopal Seminary of Bedonia, Piacenza; the Pontifical Lateran University in Rome where he earned a doctorate in canon law; and at the Pontifical Ecclesiastical Academy.

=== Early career ===
He was ordained to the priesthood on 27 May 1937 in Piacenza. He studied in Rome from 1937 to 1939. Beginning in 1940 he served in the Vatican Secretariat of State while also participating in pastoral ministry in the diocese of Rome from 1943. He was named Privy Chamberlain of His Holiness on 4 January 1945. He served as chaplain of Villa Agnese from 1950 to 1998. He was raised to the rank of Domestic prelate of His Holiness on 22 December 1954.

He served as an assistant to Cardinal Adeodato Giovanni Piazza at the First General Conference of the Latin American Bishops in Rio de Janeiro, Brazil, in 1955. He served as a faculty member of the Pontifical Ecclesiastical Academy from 1958 to 1961. On 24 February 1961, he was appointed Undersecretary of the Sacred Congregation for Extraordinary Ecclesiastical Affairs, effectively deputy foreign minister. In 1964, he represented the Holy See at the exchange of instruments in ratification of the modus vivendi with Tunisia, concerning the situation of the Catholic Church. He was a signatory of the partial agreement between the Holy See and Hungary in Budapest on 15 September 1964. He negotiated with the Communist Czechoslovak government over the appointment of František Tomášek as apostolic administrator of the Archdiocese of Prague in February 1965. He was appointed secretary of the Sacred Congregation for Extraordinary Ecclesiastical Affairs on 29 June 1967.

Pope Paul consecrated him a bishop on 16 July 1967.

During the period following Vatican II, Casaroli gained a reputation as a highly skilled diplomat who was able to negotiate with regimes hostile to the Church. He headed the CSCE conference in Helsinki from 30 July to 1 August 1975. On 28 April 1979, he was appointed Pro-Secretary of State.

=== Cardinal ===
Casaroli was made a Cardinal-Priest of Ss. XII Apostoli in John Paul II's first consistory in 1979, and at the same time he became Secretary of State. Although he was seen as less hardline than any other close associate of John Paul, Casaroli's skillful diplomacy was seen by Wojtyła as an irreplaceable asset in the struggle against the Soviet Union.

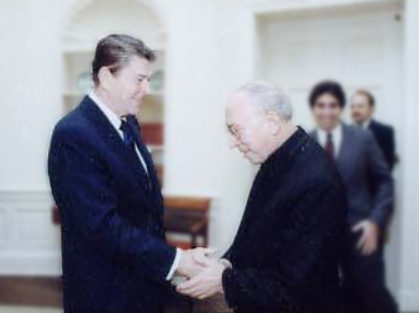
Casaroli meeting with Ronald Reagan as Vatican Secretary of State in 1981

In 1985, he became Cardinal Bishop of the suburbicarian diocese of Porto-Santa-Rufina, and in 1990, he retired as Secretary of State, being succeeded by Angelo Sodano (who became Pro-Secretary of State at that time). He was Vice-Dean of the College of Cardinals from 1993 until his 1998 death of cardiorespiratory disease.

== Views ==
=== Relations with Communism ===
As the Holy See's Secretary of State, Casaroli was a significant influence in the Holy See's efforts to come to terms with the Communist countries and develop its approach of Ostpolitik.

Casaroli's signing of treaties with Hungary in 1964 and Yugoslavia in 1966 was the first time the Holy See had opened itself in this way to Communist governments.

Beginning in 1967, Casaroli made visits to Poland, meeting with Bishops there including Karol Wojtyła, the future Pope John Paul II. According to academic Paul P. Mariani, Casaroli likely vetted Wojtyła to be named a Cardinal in June 1967.

In the Holy See's interactions with the People's Republic of China, Casaroli's view was that the Holy See should prioritize dialogue and diplomacy in an effort to make incremental gains for the Church.

In his obituary, The New York Times described him as an "architect of reconciliation with the Communist world."

According to writer John O. Koehler, the KGB and its "brother organs" in Eastern Europe were well aware of Cardinal Casaroli's real opinions and influence. Therefore, his personal office was one of the primary espionage targets inside the Vatican.

The KGB was assisted in this by the Cardinal's own nephew, Marco Torreta, and Torreta's Czechoslovak wife Irene Trollerová. According to Italian intelligence officials, Torreta had been a KGB informant since 1950.

According to Koehler:

Irene returned from Czechoslovakia in the early 1980s, with a ceramic statue of the Virgin Mary, about 10 inches high, a beautiful work of renowned Czech ceramic art. The couple presented the statue to Cardinal Casaroli, who accepted gratefully. What a betrayal by his own nephew! Inside the revered religious icon was a "bug", a tiny but powerful transmitter, which was monitored from outside the building by the couple's handlers from the Soviet Embassy in Rome. The statue had been placed in an armoire in the dining room close to Cardinal Casaroli's office. Another eavesdropping device inside a rectangular piece of wood was hidden in the same armoire. Both were not discovered til 1990 during a massive probe initiated by Magistrate Rosario Priore in the aftermath of the assassination attempt on Pope John Paul II. The bugs had been transmitting until that time."

=== Teilhard de Chardin ===
On 10 June 1981, on the 100th anniversary of Pierre Teilhard de Chardin's birth, L'Osservatore Romano, the official Vatican newspaper, published a letter by Casaroli that praised the "astonishing resonance of his research, as well as the brilliance of his personality and richness of his thinking." Casaroli wrote that Teilhard had anticipated John Paul II's call to "be not afraid", embracing "culture, civilization and progress". The letter was antedated 12 May 1981, the day prior to the attempted assassination of Pope John Paul II, but was published during his convalescence. On 20 July 1981, a communiqué of the Press Office of the Holy See stated that the letter did not change the position of the warning issued by the Holy Office on 30 June 1962, which pointed out that Chardin's work contained ambiguities and grave doctrinal errors.

=== Pecorelli list ===
Casaroli was one of the people accused on the so-called Pecorelli list, alleging membership in Freemasonry of 121 men associated with the Vatican, where he is listed with the code name “CASA”, supposedly initiated on 28 September 1957. This list was named for the Italian journalist Carmine Pecorelli (himself a member of Propaganda Due, assassinated in 1979), who published it in his journal Osservatore Politico in 1978, but it had also been published elsewhere in Panorama two years earlier.

== Honors ==
- Honorary degree, University of Pavia, 1991

== In popular culture ==
Cardinal Casaroli was portrayed by veteran character actor Ben Gazzara in the 2005 miniseries, Pope John Paul II.

Political offices
Preceded by Jean-Marie Villot	Cardinal Secretary of State; 1 July 1979 – 1 December 1990	Succeeded by Angelo Sodano
Catholic Church titles
Preceded by Giuseppe Caprio	President of the Administration of the Patrimony of the Apostolic See; 30 January 1981 – 8 April 1984	Succeeded by Agnelo Rossi
Preceded by Sebastiano Baggio	Vice-Dean of the College of Cardinals; 5 June 1993 – 9 June 1998	Succeeded by Joseph Ratzinger
