= Mario Roberto Cassari =

Italian Roman Catholic archbishop and diplomat

Mario Roberto Cassari (27 August 1943 – 19 August 2017) was an Italian Roman Catholic archbishop and diplomat. He joined the diplomatic service of the Holy See in 1977 and served as apostolic nuncio in several countries from the time he became an archbishop in 1999 until he retired in 2016.

== Biography ==
Mario Roberto Cassari was born in Ghilarza, Oristano, Sardinia, Italy on 27 August 1943. He was ordained a priest for the Diocese of Ampurias-Tempio on 27 December 1969. He obtained a degree in theology and a licentiate in canon law at Pontifical Lateran University in Rome. From 1969 to 1974 he was parochial vicar at the Cathedral of Tempio Pausania, taught school, was a bishop's secretary and studied pedagogy at the University of Sassari.

He then studied at the Pontifical Ecclesiastical Academy in Rome and entered the diplomatic service of the Holy See on 22 March 1977. He worked in the Apostolic Nunciatures in Pakistan, Colombia, Ecuador, Sudan, South Africa, Japan, Austria, Lithuania (Latvia/Estonia), Federal Republic of Yugoslavia (Serbia/Montenegro) and Bosnia and Herzegovina. In 1987, when the departure of the Apostolic Nunzio to South Africa Joseph Mees left him temporarily in charge of the nunciature there, he addressed a meeting of South Africa's bishops and directly contradicted Mees' position that Pope John Paul's strictures against involvement in politics applied to South Africa bishops under apartheid. He received a standing ovation when he said:

You, more than others, know your people, you live among them, you share their anxieties and their sorrows as a result of their everyday conditions. For all this you must shout even from the rooftops–in the name of God–that the time has come that South Africa really becomes a New South Africa.

On 3 August 1999 Pope John Paul II appointed him Titular Archbishop of Tronto and Apostolic Nuncio to the Republic of the Congo and Gabon. He received his episcopal consecration on 16 October 1999. On 31 July 2004 John Paul appointed him Apostolic Nuncio to Côte d'Ivoire and Burkina Faso, and on 8 September 2004 also Apostolic Nuncio to Niger. His assignments in Burkina Faso and Niger ended with the appointment of his successor on 12 June 2007.

On 14 February 2008 Pope Benedict XVI named him Apostolic Nuncio to Croatia. On 10 March 2012 he was appointed Apostolic Nuncio to South Africa, Botswana, Namibia and Swaziland, adding Lesotho a week later.

Pope Francis named him Apostolic Nuncio to Malta on 22 May 2015.

He retired in April 2017 and died on 19 August 2017.
