= Francesco Saverio Toppi =

Italian archbishop

Venerable Francesco Saverio Toppi OFMCap
- Prelate Emeritus of Pompei
- Church: Roman Catholic Church
- Archdiocese: Naples
- See: Pompei
- Appointed: 13 October 1990
- Term ended: 17 February 2001
- Predecessor: Domenico Vacchiano
- Successor: Domenico Sorrentino

Orders
- Ordination: 29 June 1948 by Michele Raffaele Camerlengo
- Consecration: 7 December 1990 by Michele Giordano

Personal details
- Born: Vincenzo Toppi; 26 June 1925 Brusciano, Naples, Kingdom of Italy
- Died: 2 April 2007 (aged 81) Nola, Naples, Italy
- Buried: Santuario della Beata Vergine di Pompeii
- Education: Pontifical Gregorian University
- Motto: Maria speravi meum

Francesco Saverio Toppi (26 June 1925 – 2 April 2007) - born Vincenzo Toppi - was an Italian Capuchin who served as the Prelate of Pompei from 1990 until his resignation in 2001. Toppi fostered a deep devotion to the Blessed Mother and this devotion further developed and was solidified when he was appointed to oversee the Marian shrine in the Pompei prelature. He carried out his duties to the fullest as a teacher serving in Palermo and Naples prior to his episcopal appointment and served in various capacities of leadership for his order.

Toppi's reputation for holiness and his rapport with the faithful led to calls after his death for his cause of beatification to be introduced and the cause was introduced on 3 October 2013 titling Toppi as a Servant of God. He was named as venerable in 2022.

== Life ==
Vincenzo Toppi was born on 26 June 1925 in Brusciano to humble and simple peasants.

Toppi had total and unconditional love for the Blessed Mother and desired nothing more since his childhood than total self-giving all for Jesus Christ. But his piousness was often countered with mischievousness since he liked pranks that appealed to his often exuberant character. He was also noted for his keen intelligence and was seen as a brilliant student due to his academic achievements. His father had initial doubts about his son's vocation but encouraged him after giving him his blessing.

He commenced his ecclesial studies on 19 October 1936 in the San Agnello district in Sorrento and in 1940 completed high school which he had spent in both Nola and Avellino where he had completed his theological education from 1944 until 1948. He commenced his novitiate in the Order of Friars Minor Capuchin in 1940 when he entered their order and he later made his perpetual profession of vows on 7 July 1947. Toppi graduated from the Pontifical Gregorian in Rome in historical sciences on 20 June 1951.

Toppi began teaching in Naples in the old convent of Sant'Efremo (1957–71) while from 1959 to 1968 serving as the provincial superior for the Naples province of his order; he held exactly the same position from 1971 to 1976 though for the Sicilian province when he was based in Palermo. It was during this period that he made visits to both Africa and Latin America. He later taught at the Ateneo San Giovanni Evangelista in Palermo from 1974 to 1976 of which he was one of the co-founders of. Toppi later published the historical thesis entitled "Maria Lorenza Longo e l'Opera del Divino Amore a Napoli"; he was also a writer. He once met with Saint Pio da Pietrelcina and with Chiara Lubich of the Focolare Movement.

Toppi collaborated with Catholic Action in Benevento and with the Secular Franciscan Order in Naples and he served on the Diocesan Pastoral Council of the Nola diocese from 1984 until 1989. Pope John Paul II appointed Toppi on 13 October 1990 as the Bishop-Prelate of Pompei while elevating him as an archbishop (the holder of the said office was a bishop in rank). Cardinal Michele Giordano conferred episcopal consecration upon Toppi on the following 7 December in the Santuario della Beata Vergine del Rosario di Pompei. In 2000 he submitted his resignation to the pope in accordance with canon law and this was accepted later in 2001.

Toppi died at 1:00am on 2 April 2007 in a Franciscan convent after a prolonged period of frail health and Cardinal Crescenzio Sepe presided over his funeral at 4:00pm on 3 April. His remains were interred in the Santuario della Beata Vergine del Rosario di Pompei.

== Beatification process ==
On 15 April 2013 the bishops from the Campania region approved the proposal to request and launch the beatification cause for Toppi and this decision was communicated one month later. The official request was lodged to the Congregation for the Causes of Saints on 13 June 2013.

The cause commenced on 3 October 2013 under Pope Francis once the C.C.S. issued the official edict of "nihil obstat" (nothing against the cause) which approved the cause's introduction and titled Toppi as a Servant of God. Tommaso Caputo inaugurated the diocesan process on 2 April 2014 and later closed the process upon the investigation being completed on 13 October 2016. The C.C.S. ratified the diocesan process on 3 November 2017 and received the "Positio" dossier to assess in 2020. Nine theologians voiced their approval after assessing the dossier on 23 February 2021 and the C.C.S. also confirmed their approval later on 11 January 2022. Pope Francis named Toppi as Venerable on 20 January 2022 after he determined that the late bishop had lived a life of heroic virtue. The postulator for this is the Capuchin friar Carlo Calloni and the vice-postulator for the cause is the priest Massimiliano Noviello.
