= Carlo Cremonesi =

Italian cardinal of the Roman Catholic Church

His Eminence Carlo Cremonesi
- Cardinal-Priest of San Lorenzo in Lucina
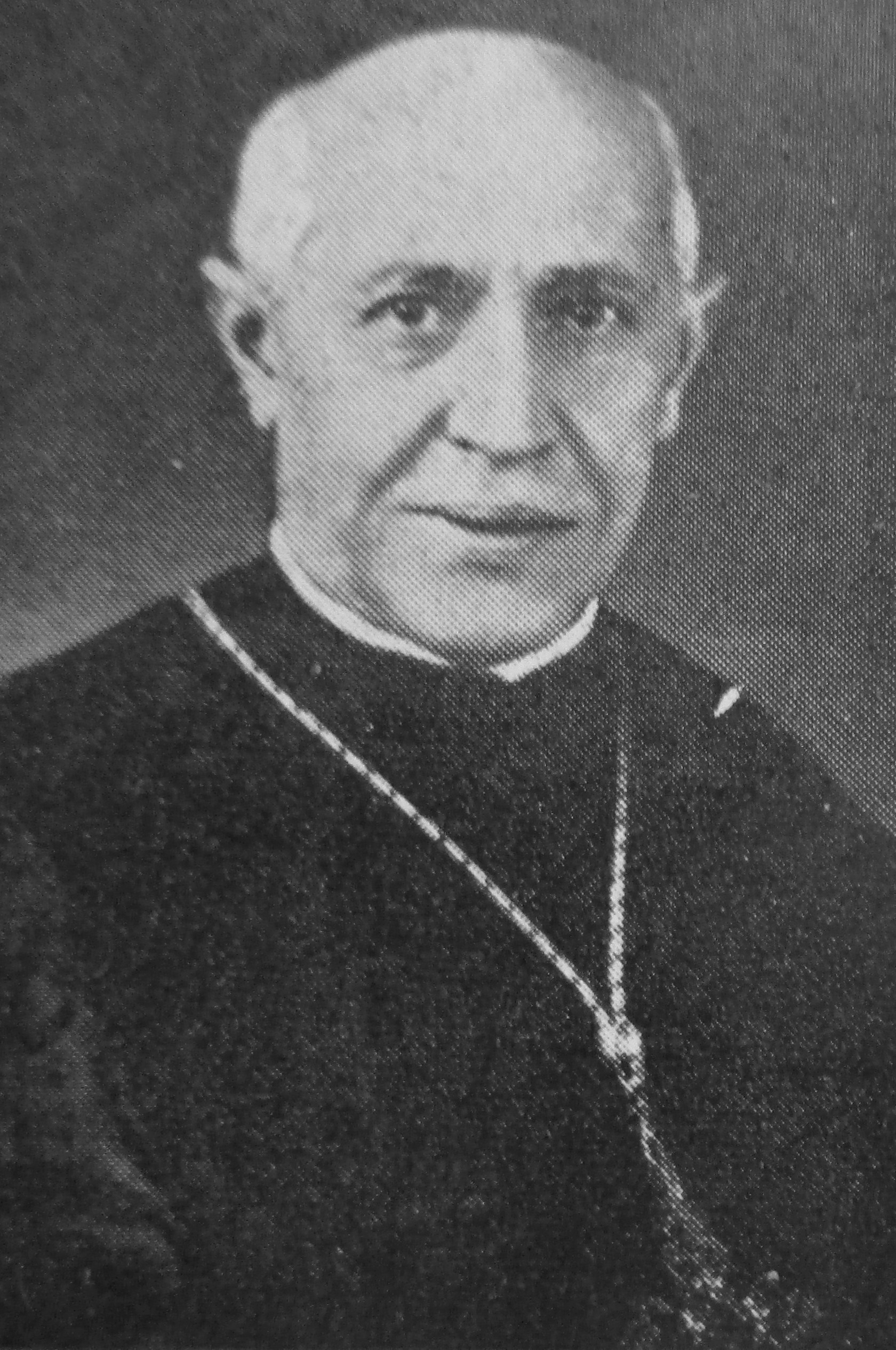
- Church: Roman Catholic Church
- Appointed: 19 December 1935
- Term ended: 25 November 1943
- Predecessor: Pietro Gasparri
- Successor: Manuel Arteaga y Betancourt
- Previous posts: Titular Archbishop of Nicomedia (1921-35); Almoner of the Office of Papal Charities (1921-35); Bishop-Prelate of Pompeii (1926-27)

Orders
- Ordination: 21 June 1890
- Consecration: 8 January 1922 by Pope Benedict XV
- Created cardinal: 16 December 1935 by Pope Pius XI
- Rank: Cardinal-Priest

Personal details
- Born: Carlo Cremonesi; 4 November 1866 Rome, Papal States
- Died: 4 November 1943 (aged 77) Vatican City
- Buried: San Lorenzo in Lucina
- Education: Pontifical Roman Seminary

Styles of Carlo Cremonesi
- Reference style: His Eminence
- Spoken style: Your Eminence
- Informal style: Cardinal
- See: none

Carlo Cremonesi (4 November 1866 – 25 November 1943) was an Italian cardinal of the Roman Catholic Church who served as Territorial Prelate of Pompei from 1926 to 1928, and was elevated to the cardinalate in 1935.

== Biography ==
Cremonesi was born in Rome, and there studied at the Pontifical Roman Seminary before being ordained to the priesthood on 21 June 1890. He then taught literature at the Pontifical Urbaniana University in Rome until 1909. Once private secretary to Cardinal Luigi Galimberti, he was also a canon of the chapter of Sant'Angelo in Pescheria, and was raised to the rank of an Honorary Chamberlain on 22 May 1898. Cremonesi served as notary for the processes of the candidates to become Italian bishops, and later as Secretary of the Pontifical Commission for Works of Religion from 1909 to 1921. He was made a Domestic Prelate of His Holiness on 9 September 1910, and a cleric of the Apostolic Chamber on 14 June 1914.

On 29 December 1921, Cremonesi was appointed Privy Almoner of His Holiness and titular archbishop of Nicomedia by Pope Benedict XV. He received his episcopal consecration on 8 January 1922 from Pope Benedict himself, with Archbishop Giovanni Nasalli Rocca di Corneliano and Bishop Agostino Zampini, OSA, serving as co-consecrators, in the Sistine Chapel. Cremonesi was later named Apostolic Delegate to the Pontifical Shrine of Our Lady of Pompei on 9 March 1926, and the first Territorial Prelate of Pompei on 21 March 1926. He resigned the prelature in 1928, and described Benito Mussolini's fifty-five-minute-long audience with Pope Pius XI in February 1932 as "very long".

Pope Pius created Cremonesi cardinal-priest of San Lorenzo in Lucina in the consistory of 16 December 1935. He was one of the cardinal electors who participated in the 1939 papal conclave that selected Pope Pius XII.

Cardinal Cremonesi died in Rome from a heart attack at age 77. He is buried in his titular church of S. Lorenzo in Lucina.

Catholic Church titles
Preceded by none	Territorial Prelate of Pompei; 1926–1928	Succeeded by Antonio Anastasio Rossi
