= Luigi Conti (nuncio) =

Italian Roman Catholic archbishop (1929–2015)

- Apostolic Nuncio to Libya & Malta
- Church: Catholic Church
- See: Apostolic Nunciature to Libya & Malta
- In office: 8 August 2001 – 5 June 2003
- Predecessor: Luigi Gatti
- Successor: Félix del Blanco Prieto
- Other post: Titular Archbishop of Gratiana (1975-2015)
- Previous posts: Apostolic Nuncio to Turkmenistan & Turkey (1999-2001); Apostolic Nuncio to Honduras (1991-1999); Apostolic Nuncio to Ecuador (1987-1991); Apostolic Pro-Nuncio to Iraq & Kuwait (1983-1987); Apostolic Nuncio to Haiti (1975-1983); Permanent Observer of the Holy See to UNESCO (1971-1975)

Orders
- Ordination: 29 September 1954
- Consecration: 5 August 1975 by Jean-Marie Villot

Personal details
- Born: 2 March 1929 Ceprano, Province of Frosinone, Kingdom of Italy
- Died: 5 December 2015 (aged 86) Viterbo, Lazio, Italy

Luigi Conti (2 March 1929 – 5 December 2015) was an Italian prelate of the Catholic Church who spent his career in the diplomatic service of the Holy See. He held the title of archbishop and the rank of nuncio from 1975.

== Biography ==
Conti was born on 2 March 1929 in Ceprano, Province of Frosinone, Italy. He was ordained a priest of the Diocese of Veroli-Frosinone on 29 September 1954. He prepared for a diplomatic career at the Pontifical Ecclesiastical Academy.

He early assignments working in the diplomatic service took him to Indonesia, Venezuela, Belgium, and France. In 1971 he became Permanent Observer of the Holy See to UNESCO in Paris.

On 1 August 1975, Pope Paul VI named him Apostolic Nuncio to Haiti, Apostolic Delegate to the Antilles, and titular archbishop of Gratiana. He received his episcopal consecration from Cardinal Jean-Marie Villot on 5 October. He defended his newly constructed residence when criticized for its extravagance by Cardinal Aloisio Lorscheider and other prelates who saw it when attending a conference of Latin American bishops in Port-au-Prince. (The structure survived the earthquake and tsunami of 2010.) He continued as Nuncio to Haiti when Paul Fouad Tabet replaced him as Delegate to the Antilles on 9 February 1980.

On 19 November 1983, he was named Apostolic Pro-Nuncio to Iraq and Kuwait.

On 17 January 1987, he was named Apostolic Nuncio to Ecuador.

On 12 April 1991, he was named Apostolic Nuncio to Honduras.

On 15 May 1999, he was named Apostolic Nuncio to Turkey and Turkmenistan. While he was in that position, Pope John Paul II made the first papal reference to the "Armenian genocide".

On 8 August 2001, he was named Apostolic Nuncio to Malta and Libya.

He retired on 5 June 2003. He died on 5 December 2015.
