= Tommaso Caputo =

Italian prelate of the Catholic Church

The Most Reverend Tommaso Caputo
- Bishop-Prelate of Pompei
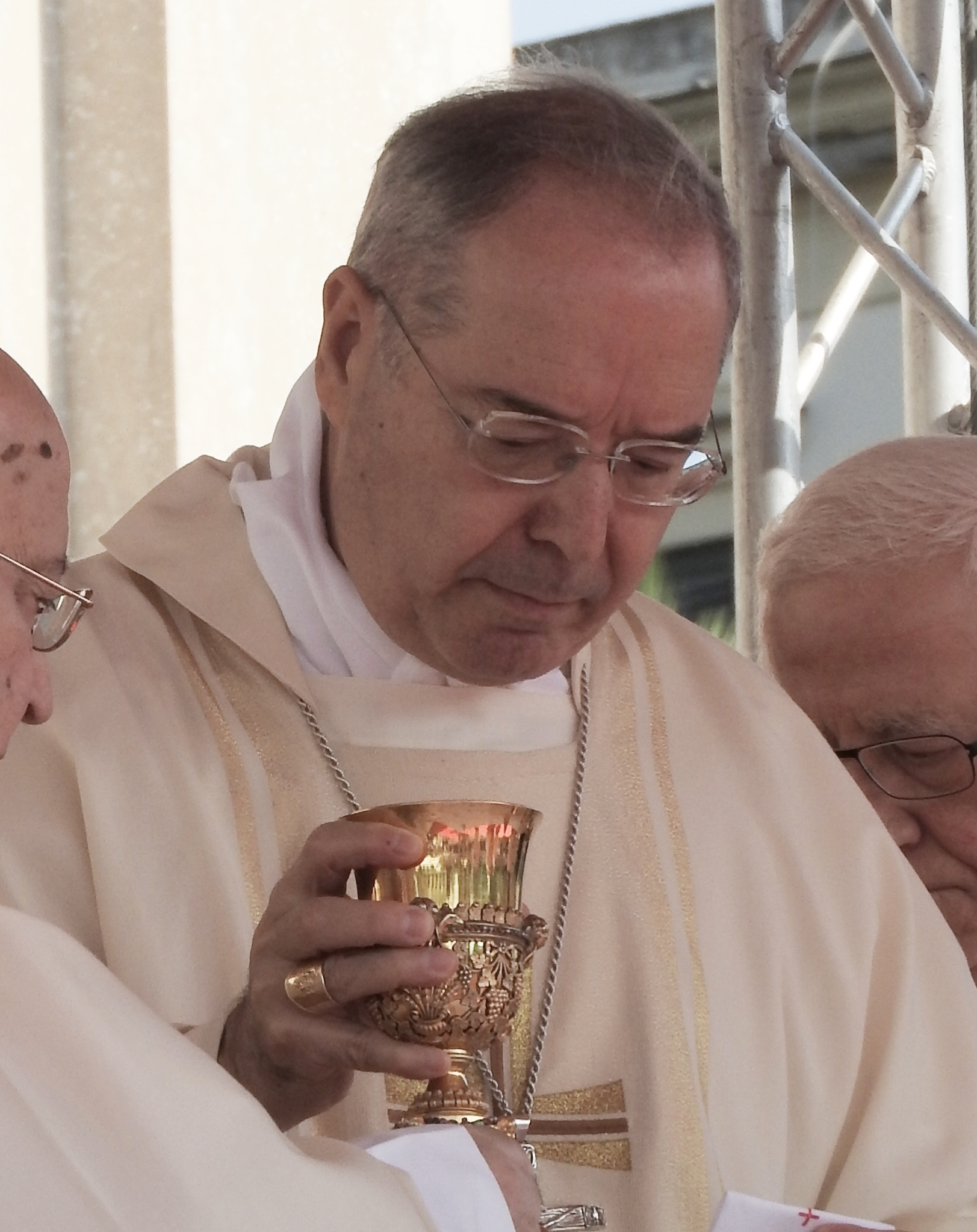
- Bishop Caputo (center) during a Mass in Pompei.
- Church: Roman Catholic Church
- See: Pompei
- Appointed: 10 November 2012
- Predecessor: Carlo Liberati
- Other post: Pontifical Delegate for the Shrine of Our Lady of the Rosary of Pompeii (2012-)
- Previous posts: Head of Protocol of the Secretariat of State (1993-2007); Titular Archbishop of Otricoli (2007–2012); Apostolic Nuncio to Libya (2007–2012); Apostolic Nuncio to Malta (2007–2012)

Orders
- Ordination: 10 April 1974 by Corrado Ursi
- Consecration: 29 September 2007 by Pope Benedict XVI

Personal details
- Born: Tommaso Caputo; 17 October 1950 (age 76) Afragola, Italy
- Education: Pontifical Ecclesiastical Academy; Pontifical Lateran University
- Motto: Adjutores gaudii vestri
- Coat of arms: Tommaso Caputo's coat of arms

Ordination history of Tommaso Caputo
History
Episcopal consecration
- Consecrated by: Pope Benedict XVI

Tommaso Caputo (born 17 October 1950) is an Italian prelate of the Catholic Church who worked in the diplomatic service of the Holy See from 1980 to 2012, when he was named Territorial Prelate of Pompei.

== Biography ==
Tommaso Caputo was born on 17 October 1950 in Afragola in Naples, Italy. He studied at the seminary in Naples and obtained a licenciate in sacred theology at the Theological Faculty of Southern Italy. He was ordained a priest on 10 April 1974. His early assignments including the formation of seminarians, parish vicar, and religion teacher in the public schools.

To prepare for a diplomatic career he entered the Pontifical Ecclesiastical Academy in 1976. While there, he also earned a doctorate in canon law at the Pontifical Lateran University. Caputo joined the diplomatic service of the Holy See on 25 March 1980 where he occupied various posts at the Apostolic Nunciatures in Rwanda (1980–1984), the Philippines (1984–1987), Venezuela (1987–1989), and at the Secretariat of State (1989–1993). On 19 June 1993 he was named Head of Protocol in the Secretariat of State.

Caputo was appointed Titular Archbishop of Otriculum and Apostolic Nuncio to Malta and Libya on 3 September 2007. He was ordained a bishop by Pope Benedict XVI (principal consecrator), and the Cardinals Tarcisio Bertone and Marian Jaworski, on 29 September 2007. In March 2011, as the political situation in Libya was becoming violent, he appealed for Italy to accept Eritrean refugees trapped in Libya. He reported that Catholic religious in the country were not in danger as "the Libyan people, as traditionally they have always done, are expressing their gratitude for the presence and service of the women religious and priests. In these days this benevolence is shown with concrete gestures of solidarity".

He held his post as Nuncio until his appointment as prelate of the Territorial Prelature of Pompei on 10 November 2012. Pope Francis approved his additional appointment to the office of Assessor of the Order of the Holy Sepulchre effective September 2019.

Diplomatic posts
Preceded by Félix del Blanco Prieto	Apostolic Nuncio to Malta; 2007–2012	Succeeded by Aldo Cavalli
Preceded by Félix del Blanco Prieto	Apostolic Nuncio to Libya; 2007–2012	Succeeded by Aldo Cavalli
Catholic Church titles
Preceded by Carlo Liberati	Prelate of the Territorial Prelature of Pompei; 2012–present	Incumbent
