= Antonio del Giudice (nuncio) =

Italian archbishop (1913–1982)

- Apostolic Pro-Nuncio to Iraq & Kuwait
- Church: Catholic Church
- See: Apostolic Nunciature to Iraq & Kuwait
- In office: 22 December 1978 – 20 August 1982
- Predecessor: Jean Rupp
- Successor: Luigi Conti
- Other post: Titular Archbishop of Hierapolis in Syria (1962-1982)
- Previous posts: Apostolic Nuncio to Malta (1974-1978); Apostolic Nuncio to Venezuela (1970-1974); Apostolic Delegate to Puerto Rico (1967-1970); Apostolic Nuncio to the Dominican Republic (1967-1970); Apostolic Pro-Nuncio to South Korea (1966-1967); Apostolic Internuncio to South Korea (1963-1966); Apostolic Delegate to South Korea (1962-1963)

Orders
- Ordination: 22 February 1936
- Consecration: 29 June 1962 by Amleto Giovanni Cicognani

Personal details
- Born: 16 April 1913 Casoria, Province of Naples, Kingdom of Italy
- Died: 20 August 1982 (aged 69) Baghdad, Iraqi Republic

Antonio del Giudice (16 April 1913 – 20 August 1982) was an Italian prelate of the Catholic Church who worked for forty years in the diplomatic service of the Holy See, serving twenty years as an apostolic nuncio. His diplomatic career included a series of postings to countries at sensitive points in their political history, including Spain, the Dominican Republic, Taiwan, Korea, and the Middle East.

== Biography ==
Born in Casoria on 16 April 1913 to the town's mayor and pharmacist, Antonio del Guidice was ordained a priest in Rome in 1936. He earned a degree in civil and canon law in 1940 and then entered the diplomatic service of the Holy See as the protege of Cardinal Secretary of State Luigi Maglione, who came from the same home town. He was assigned briefly to the Apostolic Delegation in Albania and then worked for a decade beginning in 1942 in the Apostolic Nunciature to Spain during the formative years of the Franco dictatorship, the first of several postings in political sensitive locations. His next assignments took him Ecuador in 1952, Formosa from 1958 to 1960, to India in 1961, and to the Dominican Republic as Chargé d'affaires, when the regime of Rafael Leónidas Trujillo had just been overthrown by the military. There he gave sanctuary to the provisional president Joaquín Balaguer in the Nunciature and gave him a safe-conduct to visit foreign countries while the revolutionaries held power.

On 18 April 1962 he was appointed Apostolic Delegate in Korea by Pope John XXIII, and on 29 June he received his episcopal consecration as titular archbishop of Hierapolis of Syria from Cardinal Amleto Giovanni Cicognani.

He attended all three annual sessions of the Second Vatican Council.

On 19 August 1967 he was named Apostolic Pro-Nuncio to the Dominican Republic; On 2 December 1970, Nunzio to Venezuela, to Malta on 18 December 1974, where his intervention in local politics resulted in his ouster as persona non grata, and to Iraq and Kuwait on 22 December 1978. In 1989, the government of Iraq decided not to allow non-Islamic religious followers to continue to live in the country, del Guidice succeeded in having the policy reversed.

He died in Baghdad on 20 August 20 1982 at the age of 69. He was buried in the Basilica of San Mauro Abate of Casoria where his funeral monument sits next to that of Maglione.
