= Rispoli =

Rispoli is a surname. Notable persons with that surname include:

- Andrea Rispoli (born 1988), Italian footballer
- Giovanni Rispoli (1836–?), Italian engraver
- James Rispoli, former Assistant Secretary of Energy for Environmental Management
- James Rispoli (motorcyclist) (born 1991), American motorcycle racer
- John Matthew Rispoli (1582–1639), Maltese philosopher
- Luciano Rispoli (1932–2016), Italian journalist
- Michael Rispoli (born 1960), American actor
- Salvatore Rispoli (1739–1812), Italian opera composer
- Umberto Rispoli, Italian horse racing jockey
