= Apostolic Nunciature to Greece =

Diplomatic post of the Holy See

The Apostolic Nunciature to Greece is an ecclesiastical office of the Catholic Church in Greece. It is a diplomatic post of the Holy See, whose representative is called the Apostolic Nuncio with the rank of an ambassador.

== Representatives of the Holy See to Greece ==
- Ioannis Marangos (9 June 1874 - 17 December 1891)
- Antonios Delenda (22 August 1900 - 10 September 1911)
- Louis Petit (4 March 1912 - 24 June 1926)
- Carlo Margotti (12 February 1931 - 25 July 1934)
- Angelo Giuseppe Roncalli (30 November 1934 - 22 December 1944)
- Giovanni Mariani (25 April 1980 - 5 May 1990)
- Luciano Storero (28 June 1990 - 15 November 1995)
- Paul Fouad Naïm Tabet (2 January 1996 - 25 January 2005)
- Patrick Coveney (25 January 2005 - 16 July 2009)
- Luigi Gatti (16 July 2009 - 22 February 2011)
- Edward Joseph Adams (22 February 2011 - 8 April 2017)
- Savio Hon Tai-Fai (28 September 2017 - 24 October 2022)
- Jan Romeo Pawłowski (1 December 2022 - 7 October 2026)

== See also ==
- Foreign relations of the Holy See
- List of diplomatic missions of the Holy See
