= Apostolic Nunciature to Libya =

Diplomatic post of the Holy See

The Apostolic Nunciature to Libya is the diplomatic mission of the Holy See to Libya. The Apostolic Nuncio to Libya is an ecclesiastical office of the Catholic Church in Libya, with the rank of an ambassador. The nuncio serves both as the ambassador of the Holy See to the State of Libya and as delegate and point-of-contact between the Catholic hierarchy in Libya and the pope.

The Vatican established the position of Delegate to Northern Africa in 1965; John Gordon held that post until 19 August 1967. Sante Portalupi succeeded him on 27 September 1967. The delegate's responsibilities were modified as the Holy See developed relationships with countries in the delegate's area of responsibility. Portalupi took on the titles of Pro-Nuncio to Algeria and to Tunisia in 1972. When he added the title Pro-Nuncio to Morocco on 5 March 1976, his role as Delegate to North Africa was left with responsibility for Libya alone and he became Delegate to Libya.

The title Apostolic Nuncio to Libya is held by the prelate appointed Apostolic Nuncio to Malta; he resides in Malta.

== List of papal representatives to Libya ==
Apostolic Delegates to Northern Africa

- John Gordon (27 February 1965 – 14 July 1967)
- Sante Portalupi (27 September 1967 – 5 March 1976)

Apostolic Delegates

- Sante Portalupi (5 March 1976 - 15 December 1979)
- Gabriel Montalvo Higuera (18 March 1980 - 12 June 1986)
- Giovanni De Andrea (22 November 1986 - 26 August 1989)
- Edmond Farhat (26 August 1989 - 26 July 1995)
- José Sebastián Laboa Gallego (28 October 1995 - 10 March 1997)

Apostolic Nuncios

- José Sebastián Laboa Gallego (10 March 1997 – 13 June 1998)
- Luigi Gatti (13 June 1998 - 28 June 2001)
- Luigi Conti (8 August 2001 - 5 June 2003)
- Félix del Blanco Prieto (24 June 2003 - 28 July 2007)
- Tommaso Caputo (3 September 2007 - 10 November 2012)
- Aldo Cavalli (13 April 2013 - 21 March 2015)
- Alessandro D'Errico (10 June 2017 – 30 April 2022)
- Savio Hon Tai-fai (18 May 2023 – 02 February 2026)
- Wojciech Załuski (25 April 2026 – present)
