= Savio Hon =

Hong Konger Catholic archbishop (born 1950)

His Grace, The Most Reverend Savio Hon Tai-fai SDB
- Apostolic Nuncio Emeritus to Malta and Libya; Titular Archbishop of Sila
- Native name: 韓大輝
- Church: Catholic Church
- Appointed: 24 October 2022
- Retired: 2 February 2026
- Predecessor: Alessandro D'Errico
- Other post: Titular Archbishop of Sila
- Previous posts: Apostolic Nuncio to Greece (2017-2022); Apostolic Administrator sede plena of Agaña (2016); Secretary of the Congregation for the Evangelization of Peoples (2010–2017)

Orders
- Ordination: 17 July 1982 by John Baptist Wu
- Consecration: 5 February 2011 by Pope Benedict XVI, Angelo Sodano and Tarcisio Bertone

Personal details
- Born: 21 October 1950 (age 76) Hong Kong
- Denomination: Catholic
- Education: University of London; Pontifical Salesian University
- Motto: Hilarem Datorem Diligit Deus 歡欣交付，主愛常存 ("God loves a cheerful giver", from 2 Corinthians 9:7)
- Coat of arms: Savio Hon Tai-fai's coat of arms

Styles of Savio Hon Tai-fai
- Reference style: His Grace; The Most Reverend
- Spoken style: Your Grace; Your Excellency
- Religious style: Archbishop

Ordination history of Savio Hon
History
Priestly ordination
- Ordained by: John Baptist Wu (Hong Kong)
Episcopal consecration
- Principal consecrator: Pope Benedict XVI
- Co-consecrators: Angelo Sodano (Dec. Col. S. R. E. Card.); Tarcisio Bertone (Sec. Stat.)
Episcopal succession
Bishops consecrated by Savio Hon as principal consecrator
- Ryan Jimenez: 14 August 2016

Savio Hon Tai-fai SDB (traditional Chinese: 韓大輝; simplified Chinese: 韩大辉; Jyutping: Hon⁴ Daai⁶fai¹; pinyin: Hán Dàhuī; born 21 October 1950) is a Hong Konger prelate who works in the diplomatic service of the Holy See. He served as secretary of the Congregation for the Evangelization of Peoples from 2010 to 2017. Before that, he was a professor of theology at the Holy Spirit Seminary of Hong Kong.

== Biography ==
Hon was born in Hong Kong. After studying at a Salesian school, he made his first religious profession on 15 August 1969. He made perpetual vows on 15 August 1975 and was ordained a priest in Hong Kong on 17 July 1982. He received his B.A. in philosophy from the University of London and a doctorate in theology at Rome's Pontifical Salesian University.

Hon was a visiting professor at various seminaries in China and a professor of theology at the seminary of Hong Kong. His research has appeared in a variety of journals, especially those devoted to theology. He was responsible for the translation of the Catechism of the Catholic Church into Chinese. He belongs to the Salesian Province of China which encompasses mainland China, Hong Kong, Macau, and Taiwan.

Hon became a member of the Pontifical Academy of Theology in 1999. He was named to a five-year term as a member of the International Theological Commission in 2004 and his appointment was renewed in 2009.

== Diplomatic career ==
On 23 December 2010, Pope Benedict XVI appointed him Titular Archbishop of Sila and secretary of the Congregation for the Evangelization of Peoples. Hon Tai Fai had known the pope for many years since Benedict was president of the International Theological Commission during most of Hon's tenure on the commission.

Hon was consecrated in Rome on 5 February 2011 by Pope Benedict, with Cardinals Angelo Sodano and Tarcisio Bertone as co-consecrators. He said of his consecration: "I could feel an airstream when the pope laid his hands with strength on my head".

In March 2011, Hon said the planned ordination of priests by the Chinese Patriotic Catholic Association meant "division ... causes great pain to the entire body ... [the] whole body is scarred and bleeding", because no bishop can be validly appointed without a papal mandate. He added that those who have resisted the will of the party, such as Monsignor Li Lianghui (Cangzhou, Hebei) are now in isolation, forced to undergo political re-education classes. He said that Chinese priests and bishops must show "some backbone" and resist government pressure out of love for Church unity and the memory of the many heroic witnesses to the faith of the past decades. Hon has sought without success to win the release from prison of two imprisoned bishops, Su Zhi-Min of Baoding and Cosma Shi Enxiang of Yixian.

In July 2011, Archbishop Hon, while addressing hundreds of delegates during the 17th plenary assembly of Association of Member Episcopal Conferences in Eastern Africa (AMECEA) in Nairobi, stressed the ever-increasing role of the lay faithful in evangelization. He said "Given that between 70%–80% of our church collaborators are women, AMECEA should make the effort to increase room for them in decision-making processes". He warned against the culture of death especially abortion and other "ideological poisons from abroad", which are leading to the erosion of certain African values whose sense of family the church supports. "AMECEA as a community of Christians has been useful in promoting the family beyond the limits of blood relationship and tribal allegiance", he said, in reference to the many inter-ethnic conflicts engulfing the region.

On 7 March 2012 he was appointed a member of the Pontifical Committee for the International Eucharistic Congresses. On 12 June 2012, he was appointed a member of the Pontifical Council for Promoting Christian Unity.

Archbishop Hon served as the Apostolic Administrator of the Archdiocese of Agana, Guam, from 6 June 2016 until 31 October 2016 when Michael J. Byrnes was appointed Coadjutor Archbishop of the archdiocese.

On 28 September 2017, Pope Francis named him Apostolic Nuncio to Greece, his first position in the diplomatic service.

On 24 October 2022, Pope Francis named him Apostolic Nuncio to Malta.

On 18 May 2023, he was also named as nuncio to Libya.

On 2 February 2026, Pope Leo XIV accepted his resignation upon reaching the age limit.

== See also ==
- List of heads of the diplomatic missions of the Holy See

Catholic Church titles
Preceded by Angelo Amato	— TITULAR — Archbishop of Sila; 2010–present	Incumbent
Preceded by Robert Sarah	Secretary of the Congregation for the Evangelization of Peoples; 23 December 2010 – 28 September 2017	Succeeded by Protase Rugambwa
Vacant Title last held by Anthony Sablan Apuron	Apostolic Administrator of Agaña; 6 June 2016 – 31 October 2016	Succeeded by Michael J. Byrnes
Diplomatic posts
Preceded by Edward Joseph Adams	Apostolic Nuncio to Greece; 28 September 2017 – 24 October 2022	Succeeded by Jan Romeo Pawłowski
Preceded by Alessandro D'Errico	Apostolic Nuncio to Libya; 18 May 2023 – 02 February 2026	Succeeded by Wojciech Załuski
Preceded by Alessandro D'Errico	Apostolic Nuncio to Malta; 24 October 2022 – 02 February 2026	Succeeded by Wojciech Załuski
