= Apostolic Nunciature to Malta =

Diplomatic post of the Holy See

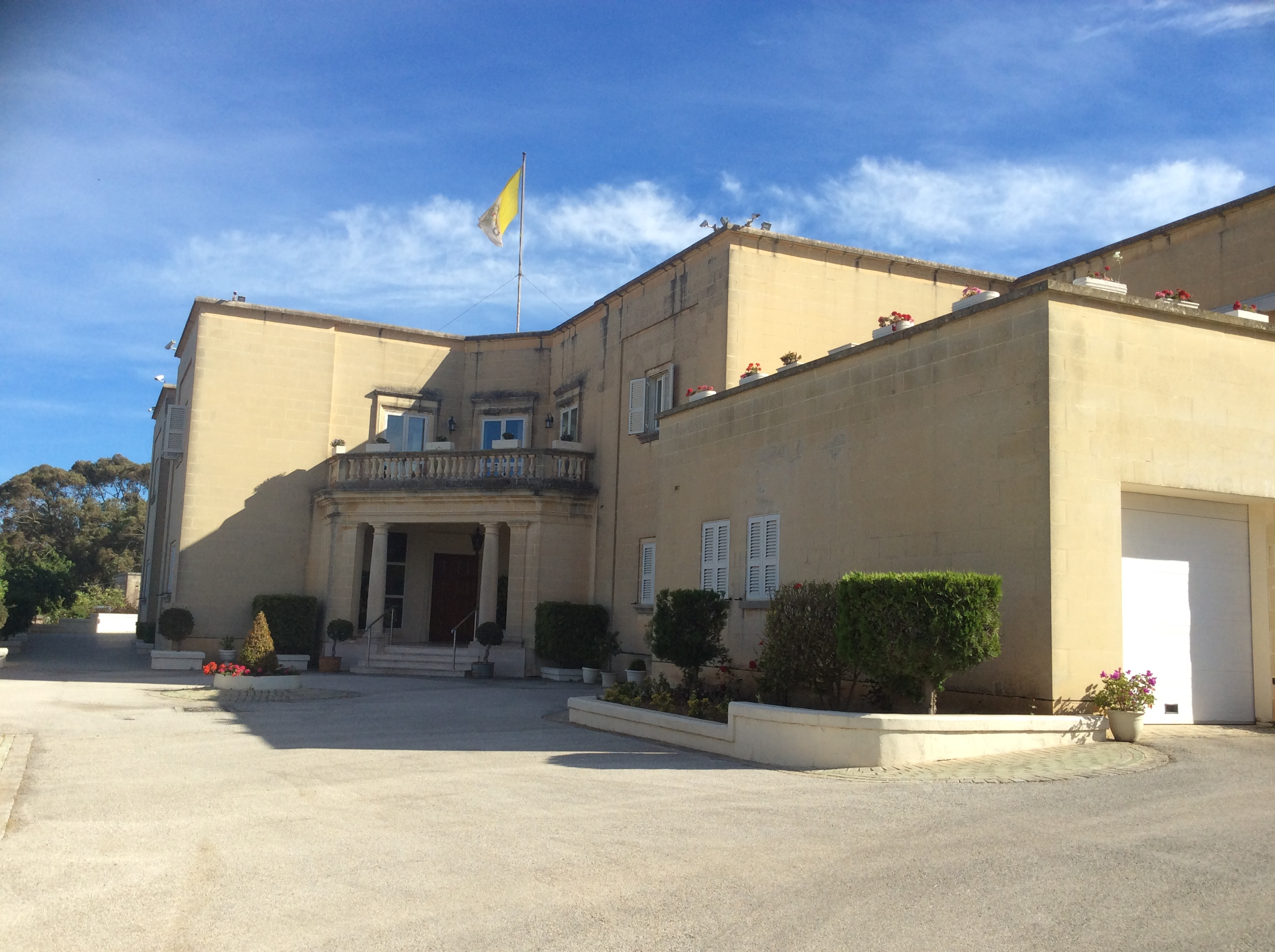
- The Apostolic Nunciature at Tal-Virtù
- Location: Malta
- Address: 20/22, Pietru Caxaru Street, Tal-Virtù, Rabat RBT 2604, Malta
- Jurisdiction: Malta
- Apostolic Nuncio: Wojciech Załuski

The Apostolic Nunciature to Malta is the diplomatic mission of the Holy See to Malta. The nunciature is located at 20/22, Pietru Caxaru Street, Tal-Virtù, Rabat RBT 2604, Malta. The Apostolic Nuncio to Malta is usually also the Apostolic Nuncio to Libya upon his appointment to said nation. The current Apostolic Nuncio is Titular Archbishop Wojciech Załuski.

The Apostolic Nunciature to Malta is an ecclesiastical office of the Catholic Church in Malta, with the rank of an embassy. The nuncio serves both as the ambassador of the Holy See to the Republic of Malta and as delegate and point-of-contact between the Catholic hierarchy in Malta and the Pope.

== History ==
The building of the Apostolic Nunciatur is found at Tal-Virtù in Rabat, Malta. The building's final design was decided by architect Joseph M. Spiteri. It was the Catholic Curia which appointed Spiteri for the final revision to the plan of the building.

== List of Apostolic Nuncios to Malta ==
- Martin John O'Connor (15 December 1965 - May 1969)
- Saverio Zupi (17 May 1969 - 14 November 1969)
- Giuseppe Mojoli (14 November 1969 - December 1971)
- Edoardo Pecoraio (28 December 1971 - 1974)
- Antonio del Giudice (18 December 1974 - 22 December 1978)
- Pier Luigi Celata (12 December 1985 - 6 February 1995)
- José Sebastián Laboa Gallego (18 March 1995 - 13 June 1998)
- Luigi Gatti (13 June 1998 - 28 June 2001)
- Luigi Conti (8 August 2001 - 5 June 2003)
- Félix del Blanco Prieto (5 June 2003 - 28 July 2007)
- Tommaso Caputo (3 September 2007 - 10 November 2012)
- Aldo Cavalli (16 February 2013 - 21 March 2015)
- Mario Roberto Cassari (22 May 2015 - 26 April 2017)
- Alessandro D'Errico (26 April 2017 - 30 April 2022)
- Savio Hon Tai-fai (24 October 2022 - 2 February 2026)
- Wojciech Załuski (28 February 2026 - present)
