= Angelo Amato =

Italian cardinal of the Catholic Church (1938–2024)

His Eminence Angelo Amato S.D.B.
- Prefect of the Congregation for the Causes of Saints
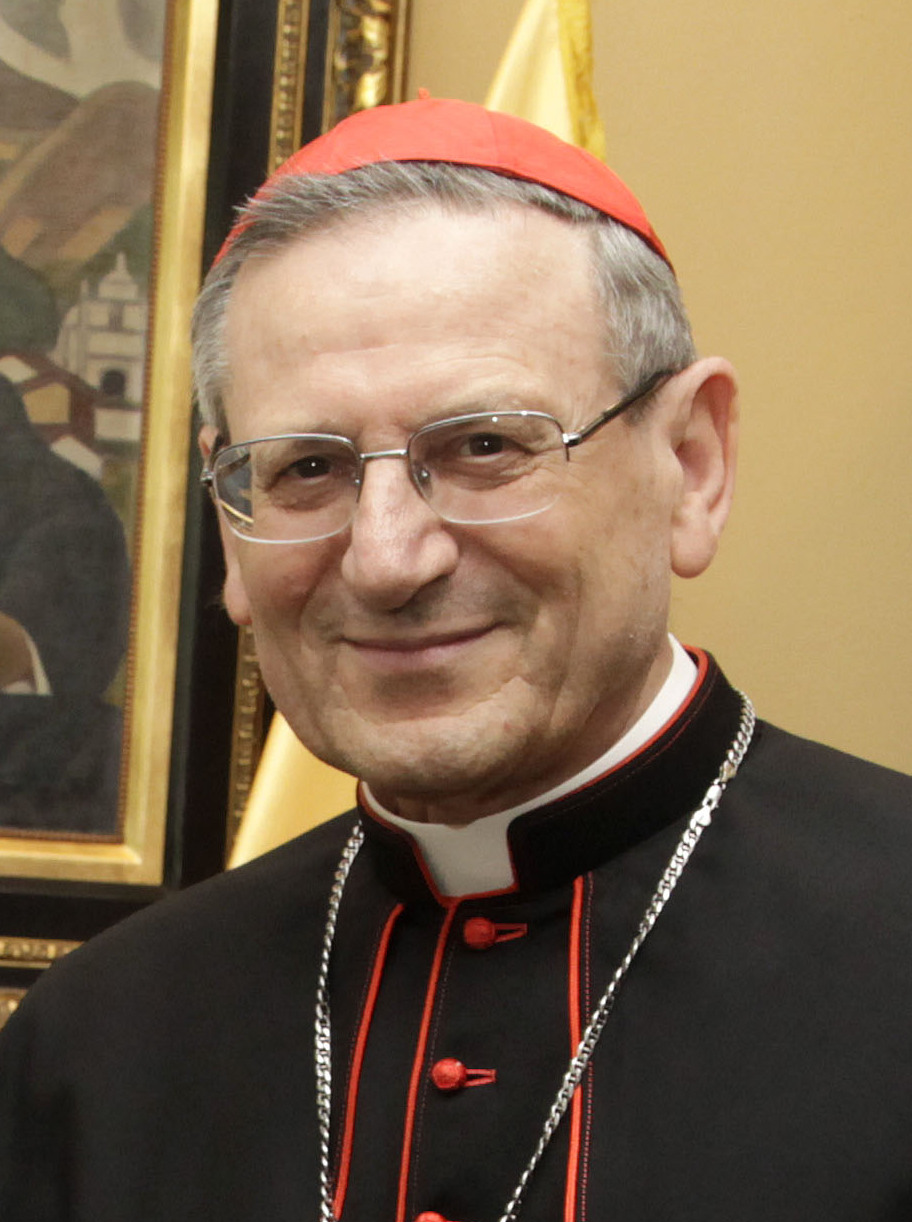
- Amato in 2015
- Church: Roman Catholic Church
- Appointed: 9 July 2008
- Term ended: 31 August 2018
- Predecessor: José Saraiva Martins, C.M.F.
- Successor: Giovanni Angelo Becciu
- Other post: Cardinal-Priest 'pro hac vice' of Santa Maria in Aquiro (2021–2024)
- Previous posts: Pro-Rector of the Salesian Pontifical University (1991); Prelate-Secretary of the Pontifical Academy of Theology (1999–2002); Titular Archbishop of Sila (2002–2010); Secretary of the Congregation for the Doctrine of the Faith (2002–2008); Cardinal-Deacon of Santa Maria in Aquiro (2010–2021)

Orders
- Ordination: 22 December 1967
- Consecration: 6 January 2003 by Pope John Paul II
- Created cardinal: 20 November 2010 by Pope Benedict XVI
- Rank: Cardinal-Deacon (2010–2021); Cardinal-Priest (2021–2024)

Personal details
- Born: Angelo Amato; 8 June 1938 Molfetta, Apulia, Italy
- Died: 31 December 2024 (aged 86) Rome, Italy
- Denomination: Roman Catholic
- Education: Salesian Pontifical University; Pontifical Gregorian University; Aristotle University of Thessaloniki
- Motto: Sufficit gratia mea ("My grace is sufficient")
- Coat of arms

Angelo Amato, S.D.B. (8 June 1938 – 31 December 2024) was an Italian cardinal of the Catholic Church who served as the Prefect of the Congregation for the Causes of Saints between 2008 and 2018. He served as Secretary of the Congregation for the Doctrine of the Faith from 2002 to 2008 and became a cardinal in 2010.

== Early life and education ==
Amato was born in Molfetta, Apulia, Italy, on 8 June 1938. He entered the Salesians after completing his novitiate at a Salesian high school. He studied philosophy and theology.

He was ordained a priest on 22 December 1967, becoming a member of the Salesians of Saint John Bosco. He studied at the Salesian Pontifical University, gaining a licentiate in philosophy, specialising in Christology. In 1972, he began to teach at the Salesian as an assistant. In 1974, he obtained his doctorate at the Pontifical Gregorian University with a dissertation on The Tridentine pronouncements on the need for sacramental confession in canons 6–9, Session XIV.

From 1978 to 1979, he was a fellow of the Ecumenical Patriarchate of Constantinople in Thessaloniki, Greece, at the monastery Orthodox Moní Vlatádon, home of the renowned Institute of patristic studies. In 1988, he spent a sabbatical year in Washington, DC, where he began to study the theology of religions.

== Academic life ==
Amato was professor of dogmatics at the Salesian Pontifical University, and for twelve years (from 1981 to 1987 and then 1993 to 1997) was dean of the Faculty of Theology. He served as a consultor to the Congregation for the Doctrine of the Faith and the Pontifical Council for Promoting Christian Unity as well as for the Congregation for Bishops.

His publications include: Trinità in contesto, Biblioteca di Scienze Religiose 110 (Roma: LAS, 1994); La Catechesi al traguardo. Studi sul Catechismo della Chiesa Cattolica, a cura di Angelo Amato, Enrico dal Covolo e Achille M. Triacca, Biblioteca di Scienze Religiose 127 (Roma: LAS, 1997); Il vangelo del Padre (Bologna: EDB, 1998); Gesù il Signore. Saggio di cristologia, Corso di Teologia Sistematica 4 (Bologna: EDB, 1999); Maria e la Trinità. Spiritualità mariana ed esistenza cristiana – Alma Mater (Roma: San Paolo Edizioni, 2000); Il celibato di Gesù (Città del Vaticano: Libreria Editrice Vaticana, 2010); and I santi della chiesa (Città del Vaticano: Libreria Editrice Vaticana, 2010).

== Secretary of the Congregation for the Doctrine of the Faith ==
On 19 December 2002, Pope John Paul II appointed him as Secretary of the Congregation for the Doctrine of the Faith and titular archbishop of Sila. He was consecrated bishop on 6 January 2003 by Pope John Paul II.

In addition to his role as CDF Secretary, Amato served as a consultor to the Pontifical Councils for Christian Unity and Interreligious Dialogue.

In an April 2007 address to chaplains, he denounced same-sex marriage and abortion and criticised the Italian media's coverage of them. He said that they are evils "that remain almost invisible" due to media presentation of them as an "expression of human progress."

=== Church treatment of Galileo Galilei ===
According to Amato, a 1633 letter discovered in the Vatican's archive proved that the Roman Inquisition, the predecessor of his Congregation, had not persecuted Galileo Galilei for maintaining that the Earth goes round the Sun. The letter from the Commissioner of the Holy Office to Francesco Barberini expressed the Pope's concern that the trial of the scientist accused of heresy be concluded quickly, as his health was poor. Archbishop Amato said the letter proved that the church's attitude to the great astronomer was benign.

== Prefect of the Congregation for the Causes of Saints ==
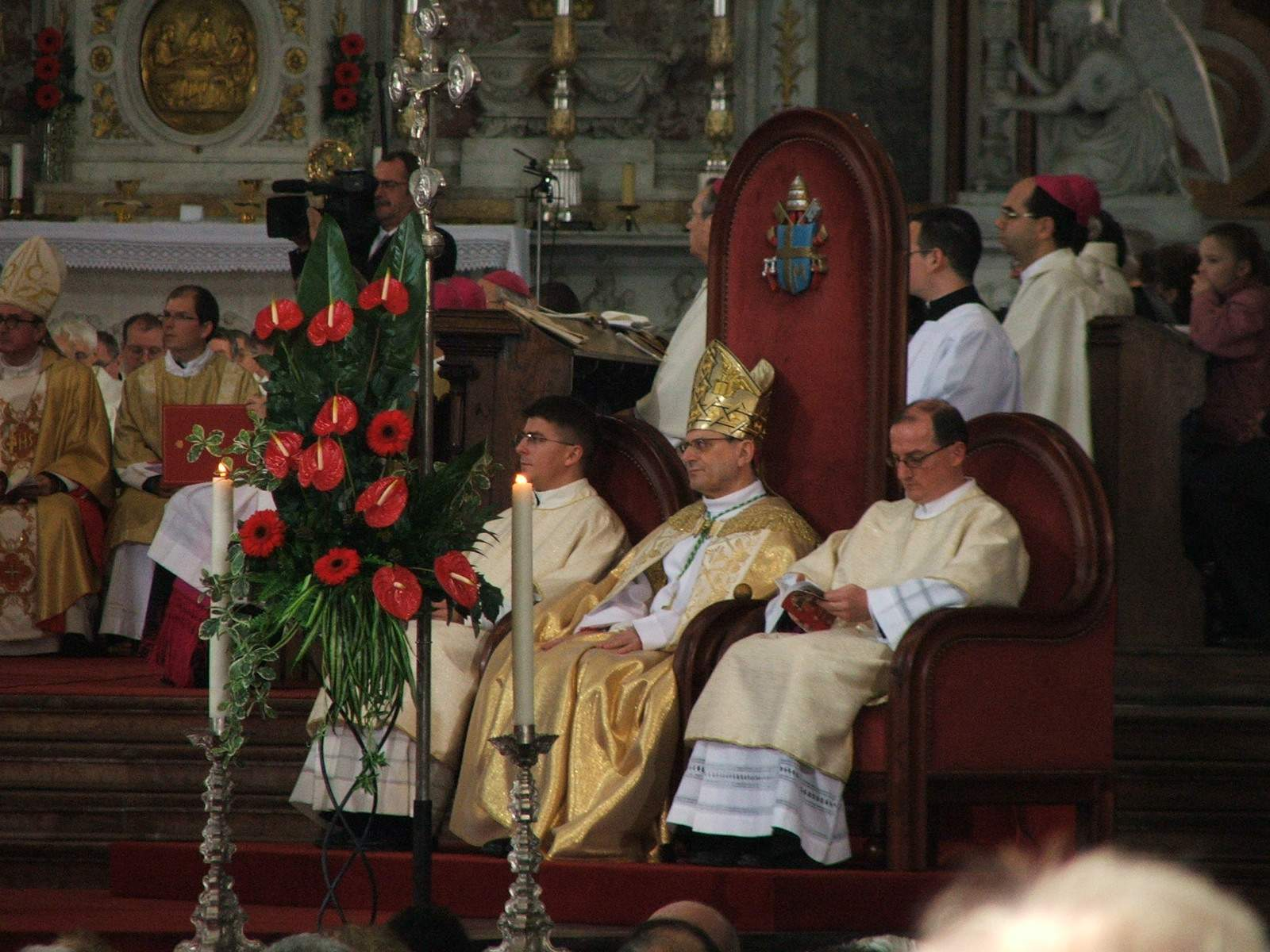
Amato at a beatification ceremony in the Esztergom Basilica

After the 2005 Papal conclave, Amato was the first person received in private audience by the new Pope Benedict XVI, who until his election had been Prefect of the Congregation of which Amato continued to be Secretary until 9 July 2008, when Pope Benedict named him Prefect of the Congregation for the Causes of Saints. Thus, Amato oversaw the process which leads to the canonisation of saints, which includes preparing a case, including the approval of certified miracles. The case is presented to the pope, who decides whether or not to proceed with beatification or canonisation. Amato was the second CDF Secretary to have led the Causes of Saints dicastery, the first having been Alberto Bovone.

Styles of Angelo Amato, SDB
- Reference style: His Eminence
- Spoken style: Your Eminence
- Religious style: Cardinal
- Informal style: Cardinal

On 6 July 2010, he was appointed a member of the Congregation for Divine Worship and the Discipline of the Sacraments. On 16 October 2010, he was appointed by Pope Benedict as a member of the Congregation for the Doctrine of the Faith for a five-year renewable term. Being resident in Rome, he was invited to attend not only the plenary meetings of those departments, which in principle are held every year, but also the ordinary meetings.

Amato was created Cardinal-Deacon of S. Maria in Aquiro by Pope Benedict XVI in the consistory of 20 November 2010.

On 29 December 2010, Amato was appointed a member of the Pontifical Council for Promoting Christian Unity.

On 14 January 2011, Pope Benedict XVI signed a decree attributing a miracle to the intercession of Pope John Paul II, clearing the way for his beatification on 1 May 2011. Amato said that the "Papal dispensation of the 5-year waiting period before opening a cause, and the second was the placing of the cause on a 'fast track' that by-passed the waiting list. There were, however, no corners cut with regard to the rigour and accuracy of procedure. The case was treated like any other, following all the steps prescribed by the law of the Congregation for the Causes of Saints. On the contrary, if I may speak further to one of my first observations: precisely in order to honour the dignity and the memory of this great Pope, to avoid any doubt and overcome any difficulties, the case was subjected to particularly careful scrutiny."

Amato was considered papabile for the papal conclave of 2013 that elected Pope Francis.

His replacement by Giovanni Angelo Becciu as Prefect of the Congregation for the Causes of Saints as of 31 August was announced on 26 May 2018.

After ten years at the rank of cardinal deacon, he exercised his option to assume the rank of cardinal priest, which Pope Francis confirmed on 3 May 2021.

== Death ==
Amato died in Rome on 31 December 2024, at the age of 86.

== See also ==
- Blessed Martyrs of Drina
- Cardinals created by Benedict XVI

Catholic Church titles
Preceded by Leoncio Leviste Lat	Titular Archbishop of Sila; 2002–2010	Succeeded by Savio Hon Tai-Fai, S.D.B.
Preceded by Tarcisio Bertone, S.D.B.	Secretary of the Congregation for the Doctrine of the Faith; 2002–2008	Succeeded by Luis Ladaria Ferrer, S.J.
Preceded by José Cardinal Saraiva Martins, C.M.F.	Prefect of the Congregation for the Causes of Saints; 2008–2018	Succeeded by Giovanni Angelo Becciu
Preceded by Antonio Innocenti	Cardinal-Deacon of Santa Maria in Aquiro; 2010–2021	Himself as Cardinal-Priest
Himself as Cardinal-Deacon	Cardinal-Priest 'pro hac vice' of Santa Maria in Aquiro; 2021–2024	Vacant
