= Sila, Numidia =

Ancient city and bishopric in North Africa

Sila was ancient city and bishopric in Roman North Africa, which remains a Latin Catholic titular see.

== History ==
Sila, identified with modern Bordj-El-Ksar in present Algeria, was among the cities important enough in the Roman province of Numidia (in the papal sway) to become one of its many suffragan dioceses, yet destined to fade, possibly with the 7th century advent of Islam.

Its only historically documented bishop, Donatus, was exiled in 484 by king Huneric of the Vandal Kingdom, like most attending Catholic bishops, unlike their Donatist (heretical) counterparts.

== Titular see ==
The diocese was nominally restored in 1925 as Latin titular bishopric of Sila (Latin = Curiate Italian) / 錫拉 (正體中文) / Silen(sis) (Latin adjective).

It has had the following incumbents, of the fitting Episcopal (lowest) rank or of higher archiepiscopal rank:

- Francis Joseph Spellman (1932.07.30 – 1939.04.15) as Auxiliary Bishop of Archdiocese of Boston (Mass., USA) (1932.07.30 – 1939.04.15); later Metropolitan Archbishop of New York (NY, USA) (1939.04.15 – death 1967.12.02) and United States of America (USA) (1939.12.11 – 1967.12.02), created Cardinal-Priest of Santi Giovanni e Paolo (1946.02.22 – 1967.12.02)
- Thomas Arthur Connolly (1939.06.10 – 1950.05.18) as Auxiliary Bishop of Archdiocese of San Francisco (Calif., USA) (1939.06.10 – 1948.02.28) and as Coadjutor Bishop of Roman Catholic Diocese of Seattle (Wash., USA) (1948.02.28 – 1950.05.18); next succeeded as last suffragan Bishop of Seattle (1950.05.18 – 1951.06.23), (see) promoted first Metropolitan Archbishop of Seattle (1951.06.23 – 1975.02.13), died 1991
- Cornelius Lucey (1950.11.14 – 1952.08.24) as Coadjutor Bishop of Cork (Ireland) (1950.11.14 – 1952.08.24); next succeeded as last Bishop of Cork (Ireland) (1952.08.24 – 1958.04.19), also Apostolic Administrator of Diocese of Ross (Ireland) (1954 – 1958.04.19) succeeding and (see) restyled as first Bishop of Cork and Ross (1958.04.19 – retired 1980.08.23), died 1982
- Joseph Trương Cao Ðại (1953.01.08 – death 1969.06.29), as Apostolic Vicar of Hai Phòng (Vietnam) (1953.01.08 – 1960) and on emeritate
- Titular Archbishop: Alberto Rencoret Donoso (1970.05.18 – 1976.02.26) as emeritate, died 1978; previously last suffragan Bishop of Puerto Montt (Chile) (1958.03.21 – 1963.05.10), (see) restyled first Metropolitan Archbishop of Puerto Montt (Chile) (1963.05.10 – 1970.05.18)
- Michael Murphy (1976.04.01 – 1980.08.23) as Coadjutor Bishop of Cork and Ross (Ireland) (1976.04.01 – 1980.08.23); next succeeded as Bishop of Cork and Ross (1980.08.23 – death 1996.10.07)
- Leoncio Leviste Lat (1980.10.30 – death 2002.11.06) first as Auxiliary Bishop of Diocese of Malolos (Philippines) (1980.10.30 – 1985), then as Auxiliary Bishop of Archdiocese of Manila (Philippines) (1985 – retired 1992.12.12), finally as emeritus
- Titular Archbishop: Angelo Amato, Salesians (S.D.B.) (2002.12.19 – 2010.11.20) as Roman Curia official : Secretary of Roman Congregation for the Doctrine of the Faith (2002.12.19 – 2008.07.09), Prefect of Roman Congregation for the Causes of Saints (2008.07.09 – ...); previously Pro-Rector of Salesian Pontifical University (1991.10.01 – 1991.12.02), Prelate-Secretary of Pontifical Academy of Theology (1999 – 2002.12.19); later created Cardinal-Deacon of S. Maria in Aquiro (2010.11.20 [2011.02.11] – ...)
- Titular Archbishop: Savio Hon Tai-Fai (韓大輝), S.D.B. (born Hong Kong) (2010.12.23 – ...) as Secretary of Roman Congregation for the Evangelization of Peoples (2010.12.23 – ...), Vice-Grand Chancellor of Pontifical Urbaniana University (2010.12.23 – ...), Apostolic Administrator sede plena of Archdiocese of Agaña (Guam, US overseas territory) (2016.06.06 – ...).

== See also ==
- List of Catholic dioceses in Algeria

== Sources ==
- Pius Bonifacius Gams, Series episcoporum Ecclesiae Catholicae, Leipzig 1931, p. 468
- Stefano Antonio Morcelli, Africa christiana, Volume I, Brescia 1816, p. 280
- GCatholic - data for all sections
