= Oscar Rizzato =

Italian Roman Catholic bishop (1928–2021)

- Almoner of the Office of Papal Charities
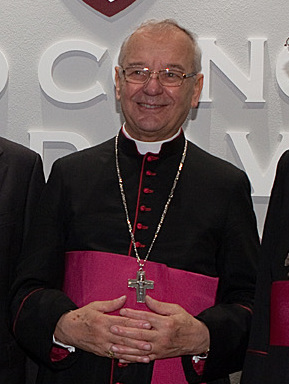
- Church: Catholic Church
- In office: 23 December 1989 – 28 July 2007
- Predecessor: Antonio Maria Travia
- Successor: Félix del Blanco Prieto
- Other post: Titular Archbishop of Virunum (1989-2021)

Orders
- Ordination: 4 July 1954
- Consecration: 6 January 1990 by Pope John Paul II

Personal details
- Born: 8 February 1929 San Giorgio delle Pertiche, Province of Padua, Kingdom of Italy
- Died: 11 January 2021 (aged 91) Padua, Province of Padua, Italy

Oscar Rizzato (8 February 1929 – 11 January 2021) was an Italian Catholic titular bishop.

== Biography ==
Rizzato was born in San Giorgio delle Pertiche, Italy and was ordained to the priesthood in 1954. He was created titular bishop of Virunum and served as Papal Almoner to the Pope.

He died of complications from COVID-19 at Padua hospital on 11 January 2021, at age 91, during the COVID-19 pandemic in Italy. The funeral was celebrated by Bishop Claudio Cipolla on 16 January in the parish church of Arsego.
