= Territorial Prelature of Pompei =

Roman Catholic ecclesiastical territory in Italy

Coordinates: 40.7500°N 14.5000°E

Territorial Prelature of Pompei Praelatura Territorialis Pompeianus seu Beatissimae Virginis Mariae a SS.mo Rosario

Catholic
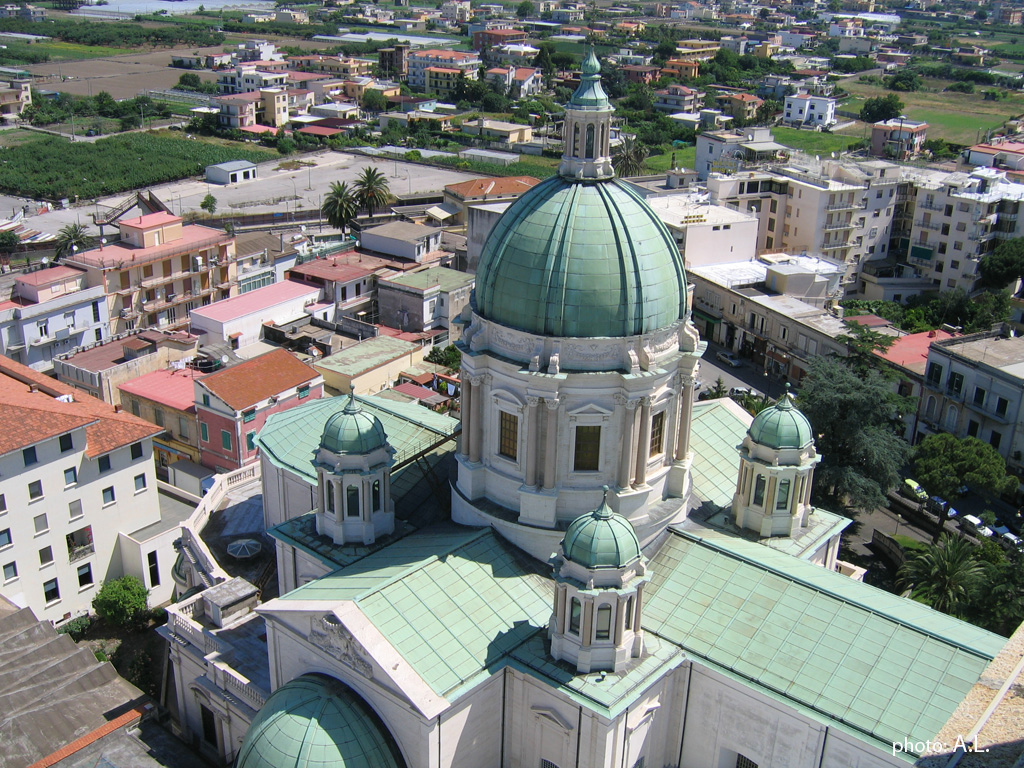
- Pompei Cathedral

Location
- Country: Italy
- Metropolitan: Napoli

Statistics
- Area: 12 km^{2} (4.6 sq mi)
- Population: Total; Catholics: (as of 2013); 26,140; 25,200 (est.) (96.4%)

Information
- Denomination: Catholic Church
- Rite: Latin Rite
- Established: 20 March 1926 (100 years ago)
- Cathedral: Santuario Basilica Pontificia della Madonna del Rosario (Cathedral & Pontifical Basilica)
- Secular priests: 42 (secular); 5 (Religious Orders)

Current leadership
- Pope: Leo XIV
- Prelate: Tommaso Caputo
- Metropolitan Archbishop: Domenico Battaglia

Website
- www.santuario.it

The Territorial Prelature of Pompei also called the Territorial Prelature of the Blessed Virgin Mary of the Most Holy Rosary (Latin: Praelatura Territorialis Pompeianus seu Beatissimae Virginis Mariae a SS.mo Rosario) is a Latin Church territorial prelature located in the city of Pompei in the ecclesiastical province of Napoli in Italy. The cathedral of the territorial prelature is the Shrine of the Virgin of the Rosary of Pompei.

== History ==
- 20 March 1926: Established as Territorial Prelature of Beatissima Vergine Maria del Santissimo Rosario
- 8 May 1951: Renamed as Territorial Prelature of Pompei

== Leadership ==
Prelates of Pompei

- Tommaso Caputo (10 November 2012 – present)
- Carlo Liberati (5 November 2003 – 10 November 2012)
- Domenico Sorrentino (17 February 2001 – 2 August 2003)
- Francesco Saverio Toppi, O.F.M. Cap. (13 October 1990 – 17 February 2001)
- Domenico Vacchiano (30 March 1978 – 13 October 1990)
- Aurelio Signora (12 March 1957 – 1977)
- Roberto Ronca (8 May 1951 – 1955)

Prelates of Beatissima Vergine Maria del Santissimo Rosario

- Roberto Ronca (21 June 1948 – 8 May 1951)
- Antonio Anastasio Rossi (19 December 1927 – 29 March 1948)
- Carlo Cremonesi (21 March 1926 – 19 December 1927)
