= Edoardo Pecoraio =

Edoardo Pecoraio (1 September 1910 – 9 August 1986) was an Italian prelate of the Catholic Church who worked in the Roman Curia and then served in the diplomatic service of the Holy See.

== Biography ==
Edoardo Pecoraio was born on 1 September 1910 in Sant'Egidio alla Vibrata, Italy. He studied at the seminaries in Montalto delle Marche and Fano. He was ordained a priest on 26 July 1935. He earned a degree in literature and law and then taught at the Montalto seminary. He served as a military chaplain in the Second World War. In 1947 he worked at the Congregation for the Propagation of the Faith. He also worked for the Tribunal of the Apostolic Signatura. He was named a peritus (expert) for the Second Vatican Council.

He joined the staff of the Congregation for the Propagation of the Faith in 1960. On 30 October 1961, Pope John XXIII appointed him under-secretary of the Congregation for the Propagation of the Faith.

On 28 December 1971, Pope Paul VI named him titular archbishop of Cumae and Apostolic Nuncio to Malta. He received his episcopal consecration on 13 February 1972 from Pope Paul.

He resigned in 1974 at the age of 63.

Pecoraio died on 9 August 1986 at the age of 75.
