= Operation Nifty Package =

1989 US capture of Panama's Manuel Noriega

- Part of the United States invasion of Panama and the war on drugs
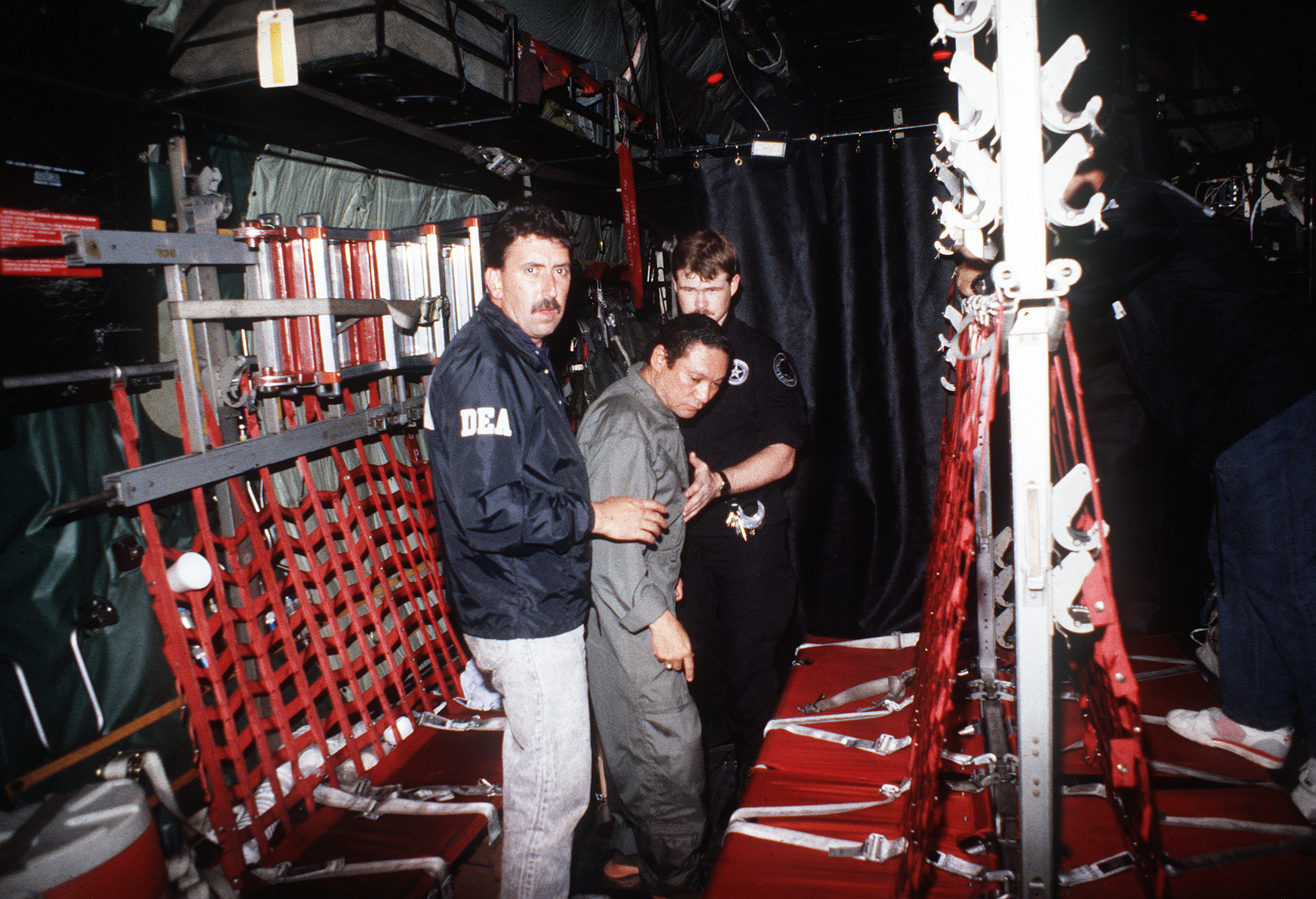
- Noriega is escorted onto a U.S. Air Force MC-130E Combat Talon I by agents from the U.S. Drug Enforcement Administration (DEA) and U.S. Marshals Service.
Date	20–23 December 1989
Location	Panama City, Panama
Result	American victory: Manuel Noriega captured

Belligerents
United States	Panama

Commanders and leaders
(United States) Cmdr. Tom McGrath (United States) Cmdr. Norman J. Carley (United States) Lt. Cmdr. Patrick Toohey	(Panama) Manuel Noriega (surrendered)

Strength
52 SEAL and Delta Force operators	Unknown; 1 gunboat

Casualties and losses
4 killed 9 wounded	1 Learjet 35A destroyed 1 gunboat sunk 3 soldiers killed 8 wounded carried off

Operation Nifty Package was a United States Delta Force and Navy SEAL-operated plan conducted in 1989 designed to capture the de facto ruler of Panama Manuel Noriega who ruled through puppet presidents. When Noriega took refuge in the Apostolic Nunciature of the Holy See (diplomatic quarter), deafening music and other psychological warfare tactics were used to convince him to exit and surrender himself.

The United States claimed that after ten days of psychological harassment, the Papal Nuncio (ambassador) Monsignor Laboa had threatened to revoke Noriega's sanctuary if he didn't surrender to the United States, although Laboa insisted that he had made no threats of revoking the right of asylum under the Church, but had used his own "precisely calibrated psychological campaign" to force Noriega's departure.

Although the operation was successful, Brent Scowcroft, National Security Advisor, would later point to the psychological harassment of the Papal Nuncio as "a low moment in U.S. Army history", noting that their approach had been silly, reproachable, and undignified.

== Military operation ==
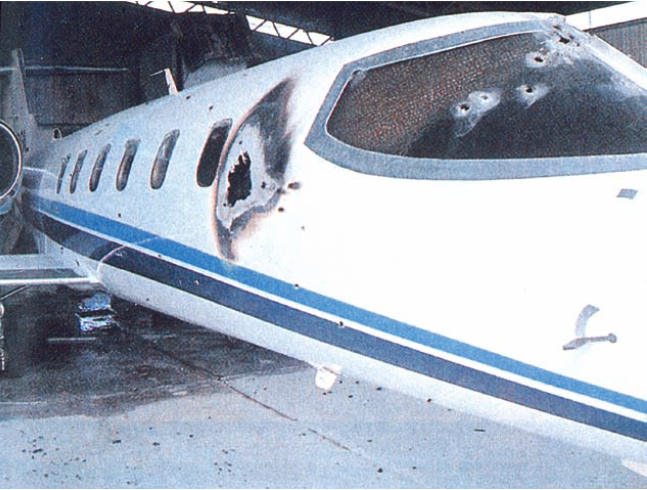
Manuel Noriega's disabled Learjet 35A jet

Launched in the starting hours of Operation Just Cause, this operation was handled by SEAL Team 4. Consisting of 48 U.S. Navy SEALs (three SEAL Platoons; Golf, Bravo, and Delta) under the command of Lt. Cmdr. Patrick Toohey (executive officer of Team 4 and former SEAL Team Six officer), this team was tasked with destroying Noriega's private jet (a 1980 Learjet 35 registered N930GL; serial 35A-330) on the ground at the Punta Paitilla Airport, a coastal airport in Panama City. The main force of SEALs landed just south of the airport at approximately 0030, shortly before the initial combat operations started within Panama City itself. Several reconnaissance teams were hidden on the north side of the airfield to provide real-time data on enemy movements. Once the SEALs landed, Lt. Cmdr. Toohey established a command post near the southern edge of the runway. At this time Cmdr. McGrath, a SEAL officer stationed on a patrol boat offshore coordinating several operations, passed on information implying that the aircraft was to be disabled with "minimal damage" (defined as shot out tires and cut control wires), rather than destroyed. This later became a point of controversy after the operation, as the message was poorly worded and forced the SEALs to change their tactics at the last minute and approach the aircraft more closely than anticipated.

The three platoons then began advancing up the airfield, with Golf platoon taking up final assaulting positions outside the hangar at roughly 0105. At this point, Lt. Cmdr. Toohey received a message stating that PDF V300 Cadillac Gage Commando armored cars were heading towards the airport. To counter the threat, a squad (Squad One of Golf Platoon) was ordered to move into ambush positions on a nearby road. As they stood up to move, the PDF soldiers stationed in the airfield immediately opened fire, killing two SEALs and wounding five others. The other two platoons moved to reinforce Golf, and within several minutes had secured the hangars, with two more SEALs killed and four more wounded. The SEALs then disabled Noriega's private plane by shooting it with an AT4 anti-tank weapon. Shortly after, a MEDEVAC helicopter arrived and transported the injured SEALs to the Joint Casualty Collection Point at Howard Air Force Base. The SEALs held the area throughout the night, and disabled the runway for use by any PDF transport planes by rolling other aircraft onto it. The next day, the SEALs were replaced by a company from the 75th Ranger Regiment. Due to the high level of casualties sustained and several inconsistencies regarding planning and command and control during the battle, the Battle of Paitilla Airport is considered one of the most controversial operations within Operation Just Cause from the U.S. Military perspective.

During the Paitilla Airfield operation, another Navy SEAL group from SEAL Team 2, consisting of four divers and men on Zodiac inflatable boats, was assigned to conduct a combat swimmer attack and sabotage Noriega's heavily armed gunboat, Presidente Porras, a 65-foot (20 m) aluminum gunboat built in 1982 in Louisiana by Swiftships, while it was tied to a pier on the canal. The plan called for the divers (Lieutenant Edward Coughlin, Chief Electronics Technician Randy Beausoleil, Engineman 3rd Class Timothy K. Eppley, and Photographer's Mate 2nd Class Christopher Dye) to plant explosives on the bottom of the boat, using Dräger rebreathers, which do not give off exhalation bubbles, for added secrecy. The divers were transported by several combat rubber raiding craft to an insertion point located in a grove of mangrove trees roughly one hundred and fifty yards (140 m) away from the target. The divers entered the water and approached the boat in separate pairs, attached the explosives, and began exfiltrating. As they were leaving, several PDF guards began dropping grenades and shooting into the water, forcing the SEALs to take cover under the pier. Due to this diversion, the divers were still in the area when the bombs went off, and were able to confirm that the boat was destroyed. As the divers were heading back to the rendezvous point, they heard a large ship approaching overhead and were forced to descend to forty feet (12 m) which was dangerous due to the increased toxicity of the pure oxygen used in the Draeger at greater pressures. However, no divers experienced any ill effects, and both pairs were picked up by several raiding craft, and were transported back to Rodman Naval Base.

== Encircling the Apostolic Nunciature of the Holy See ==
On the fifth day of the American invasion, Noriega phoned Monsignor Laboa at the Apostolic Nunciature and explained he would appreciate being able to seek sanctuary within; noting that he would otherwise have to flee to the countryside and wage a guerrilla war. Given only ten minutes to decide, Laboa said he did not confer with the Vatican, but agreed to allow Noriega to enter the Nunciature grounds – although from the very start, he confessed that he deceived Noriega, noting that he believed that Panamanian politics necessitated that his own role be to convince Noriega to surrender to the American army, not to grant him asylum within Vatican territory. Laboa later confided he was "surprised and dismayed" that Noriega would choose to seek refuge with the Church.

Noriega fled to the Apostolic Nunciature, the de facto embassy of the Holy See, and took refuge there with four others: Lieutenant Colonel Nivaldo Madrinan, head of Panama's secret police; Captain Eliecer Gaitan, who led the special force charged with protecting Noriega; Belgica de Castillo, the former head of the immigration department; and her husband Carlos Castillo. He turned over the majority of his weapons, and requested sanctuary within. He spent his time in a "stark" room with no air conditioning or television, reading the Bible for the duration of his stay.

American soldiers set up a perimeter outside this building, as any direct action against the embassy itself would have violated international diplomatic law.

United States Secretary of State James Baker wrote to the Vatican, insisting that "this is an exception to diplomatic immunity. We've indicted him as a drug dealer...you must understand that having lost American lives to restore democracy in Panama, we cannot allow Noriega to go to any other country than the United States."

Joaquin Navarro-Valls, speaking on behalf of the Vatican, clarified that the strong messages left by American diplomats and military leaders would not be obeyed and Noriega would not be turned over. Navarro-Valls clarified that Pope John Paul II had not spoken on the issue except to lament the deaths caused by "absurd imprudence".

The U.S. Army turned to psychological warfare, blaring disturbing chicken noises at "deafening levels", gunning the engines of armored vehicles against the Nunciature's fence, and setting fire to a neighboring field and bulldozing it to create a "helicopter landing zone". Reportedly the version of the song "I Fought the Law" performed by The Clash was played repeatedly along with "You Shook Me All Night Long" by AC/DC and "Welcome to the Jungle" by Guns N' Roses; other songs in the line-up were "Too Old To Rock 'N' Roll" by Jethro Tull, "Panama" by Van Halen, and "Never Gonna Give You Up" by Rick Astley.

On 27 December, the psychological warfare was turned over to the control of the 4th Psychological Operations Group of Special Operations Command. The Holy See complained to President George H. W. Bush about actions of the American soldiers surrounding the embassy, and after three days, the rock music was stopped.

On 30 December, the Vatican clarified that it did not believe Noriega had asylum, "but [was] a person in refuge". Meanwhile, Monsignor Laboa petitioned both Panama and the Vatican to agree to extend the embassy property to include another building where he had Noriega's four companions moved to prevent them from encouraging Noriega to stay under Vatican sanctuary, allowing him to convince Noriega to leave. A friend of Laboa later told the UPI that Laboa wanted to "go to work on Noriega, weave a sort of spell around him until he gives in".

== Surrender ==
After ten days of demoralization, Monsignor Jose Sebastian Laboa told Noriega that he had no choice but to surrender to the American soldiers at the front gate. Time magazine later noted that Monsignor Laboa was not entirely honest with Noriega, falsely telling him that no country in the world was willing to grant him refuge. Monsignor Laboa had also written to the US Army, granting his permission for them to storm the property if they believed his life was in danger. Eventually, Monsignor Laboa said that if Noriega did not surrender to the Americans, the Papal staff would evacuate the building, move into a Catholic high school and declare it the new embassy – leaving Noriega alone in the abandoned building to face the Americans without any benefit of Vatican sanctuary.

Noriega asked permission to phone his wife and three daughters, who had taken refuge in the Cuban embassy. He was assured that they would be flown to exile in the Dominican Republic if he surrendered.

On 3 January, Noriega attended Holy Mass in the Nuncio's chapel and took communion; where Laboa's homily was about the thief on the cross who in one moment asked God to change his life, and reportedly brought tears to Noriega's eyes.

After Mass, Noriega retired to his room where he wrote two letters, one to his wife informing her "I go now on an adventure", and the other thanking the Pope and stressing that he believed himself innocent and that he had always acted in the best interests of the Panamanian people and requesting the Pope's prayers.

Noriega surrendered on January 3, 1990. That day, he dressed in his tan uniform, receiving permission to bring the Nuncio's Bible with him, and went outside into the dark night with three priests who walked with him the fifty paces to the front gate; when he reached the front gate, an American paratrooper named Sgt. Scott Geist confronted Noriega and described him as "a broken man". A number of other soldiers then forced him to the ground and began searching his effects. His wrists were taped behind his back, and was immediately put on an MC-130E Combat Talon I aircraft, which took him to Howard Air Force Base.

Monsignor Laboa later told the press that he was proud at having "outwitted" Noriega and convincing him to surrender himself to the Americans, noting "I'm better at psychology".

== In popular culture ==
In the 1998 film Small Soldiers, the psychological tactics of the operation are mentioned by individuals being attacked by toy soldiers that are loudly playing "Wannabe" by the Spice Girls.

== See also ==
- Manhunt (military)
- Death of Pablo Escobar
- Capture of Saddam Hussein
- Capture of Abimael Guzmán
- Capture of Nicolas Maduro
