= José Sebastián Laboa Gallego =

Spanish prelate

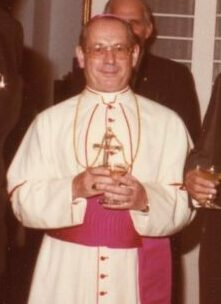
José Sebastián Laboa Gallego

José Sebastián Laboa Gallego (20 January 1923 – 24 October 2002) was a Spanish-Basque prelate of the Catholic Church who worked in the diplomatic service of the Holy See. Early in his career he held posts in the Roman Curia. He was also involved in Operation Nifty Package, convincing Panamian leader Manuel Noriega to surrender himself to American forces on 3 January 1990.

== Biography ==
José Sebastián Laboa Gallego was born in Pasai San Juan, Gipuzkoa, Spain, on 20 January 1923. He was ordained a priest on 16 April 1949. He earned a degree in theology at the Comillas Pontifical University in Madrid and a doctorate in canon law at the Pontifical Gregorian University. He worked in the Roman Curia where his assignments included stints as secretary to Cardinal Gaetano Cicognani and as the person responsible for Latin America at the Congregation for the Evangelization of Peoples.

On 18 December 1982, Pope John Paul II named him a titular archbishop and Apostolic Nuncio to Panama. He received his episcopal consecration from Pope John Paul on 6 January 1983.

On 21 August 1990, Pope John Paul appointed him Apostolic Nuncio to Paraguay.

On 18 March 1995, Pope John Paul named him Apostolic Nuncio to Malta and on 28 October Apostolic Delegate to Libya. He retired when replaced in these posts on 13 June 1998.

Laboa died on 24 October 2002 in San Sebastián.
