= Mogrovejo =

- village (pueblo) and neighborhood council (junta vecinale)
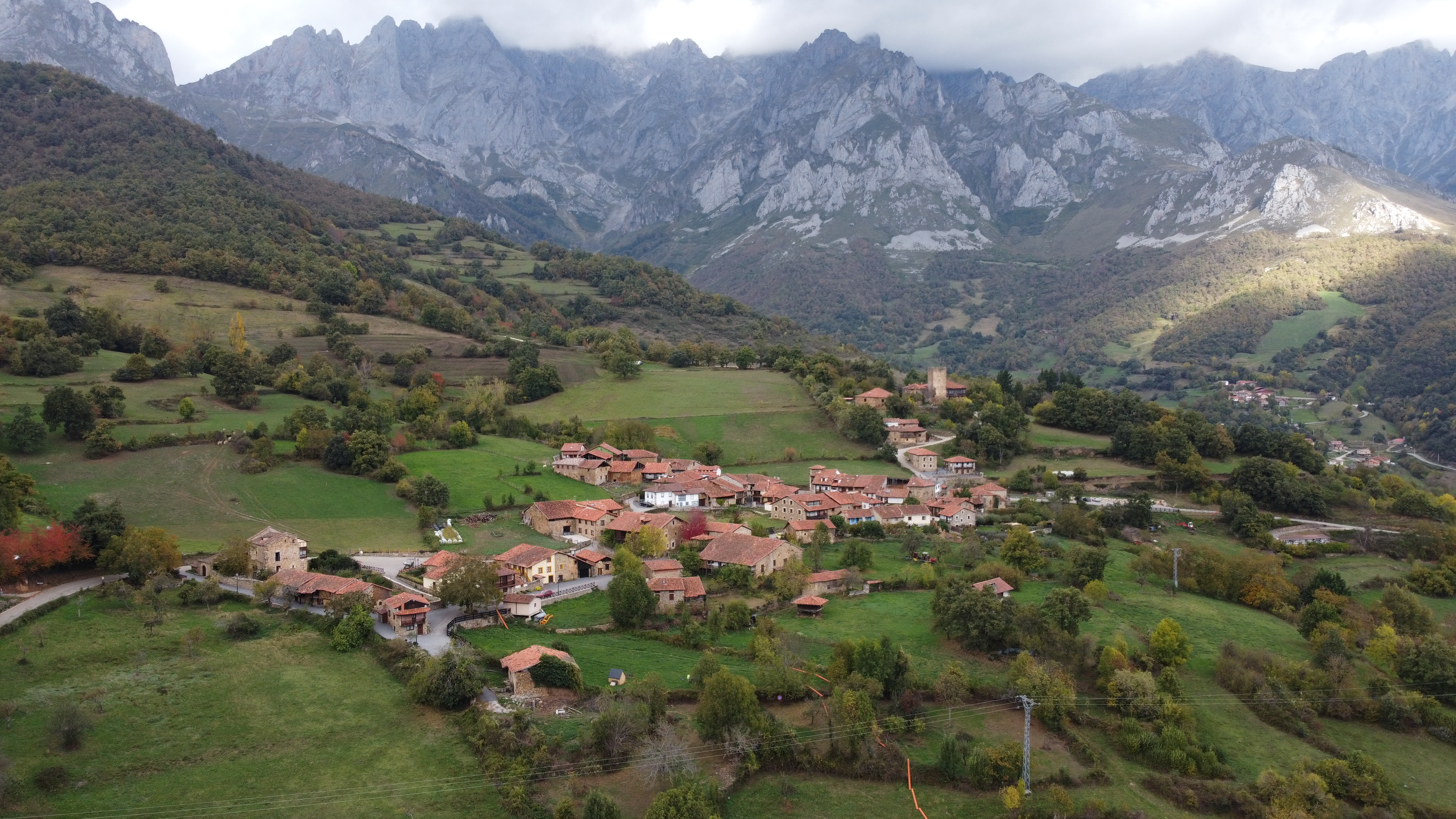

- Location in Spain
- Coordinates: 43°9′0″N 4°42′0″W
- Country: Spain
- Autonomous communities of Spain: Cantabria
- Provinces of Spain: Cantabria
- Comarcas of Spain: Liébana
- Judicial districts of Spain: San Vicente de la Barquera
- Municipalities of Spain: Camaleño

Government
  - Presidente de junta vecinale: Juan José Torre Briz (PP)
- Elevation: 460 m (1,510 ft)

Population (2008)
  - Total: 44
- Time zone: UTC+1 (CET)
  - Summer (DST): UTC+2 (CEST)
- Dialing code: 942
- Website: Official website

Mogrovejo is a small village of the municipality of Camaleño in Cantabria, Spain with 44 inhabitants in 2008.

== Geography ==
Mogrovejo is located 460 meters above sea level in the Picos de Europa, perched on a plain within the Liébana valley in front of the Ándara massif. It is 4 kilometers from the municipal capital, Camaleño.

It can be reached via CA-887, which forks off the main road of CA-185 connecting Fuente Dé and Potes.

== History ==
Until the thirteenth century, documents referred to Mogrovejo as "Luarna", the name of an old family from which the saint Turibius of Mogrovejo descended.

According to the 19th century geographic dictionary by Pascual Madoz the council of Mogrovejo included eight neighborhoods or villages, which continue to remain independent population entities: Mogrovejo, Redo, Los Llanos, Bárcena, Besoy, Sebrango, Llaves and Vallejo.

The entire urban area of Mogrovejo is a site of cultural interest, with a historical site category.

== Monuments ==
Mogrovejo was declared a historical site and site of cultural interest. Monuments include:

- the "Tower of Pedro Ruiz de Mogrovejo", a medieval tower from the end of the 13th century, the oldest preserved building
- the church "Our Lady of the Assumption" from the 17th century, a rectangular nave covered by rib-vaults, with a baroque altar, and a 16th-century crucifix. The baroque altarpiece contains the coat of arms of Mogrovejo, highlighting the sculpture of a flaming Virgin from the late 15th century, and a Gothic-Flemish image called "La Milagrosa" from the 15th century.
- mansions of the seventeenth and eighteenth century with forged balconies, some within large parcels surrounded by high walls and monumental entrances. One of Vicente de Celis stands out, with the shield of the Estrada, of the 16th century.
- ordinary houses of the Lebaniego type, with the upper floor frequently open to the exterior, interlaced walls of poles, lined with a clay mantel which delimits a space used as haystack; in some of them, the second floor can be accessed with skates, an Asturian influence. Other types of popular buildings are several semicircular bread ovens and a barn.

== Notable people ==
- Turibius of Mogrovejo (1538–1606)
- Santo Toribio de Liébana, Bishop of Astorga and the Lord of Mogrovejo, who fought with Don Pelayo.
