= Giovanni Rispoli =

Italian painter

Giovanni Rispoli (born 1838) was an Italian engraver.

== Biography ==
He was born and worked in Naples, where he studied at the Academy of Fine Arts. He created several medals, the most prominent of which were the one presented to the exhibitors of the Mostra Marittima in Naples, and the medal completed for the Società Pellattieri of Naples. Giovanni Rispoli helped decorate (1901) the facade of the Shrine of the Virgin of the Rosary of Pompei.
