= Antonio Anastasio Rossi =

Italian Roman Catholic prelate

The Most Reverend Antonio Anastasio Rossi
- Patriarch of Constantinople
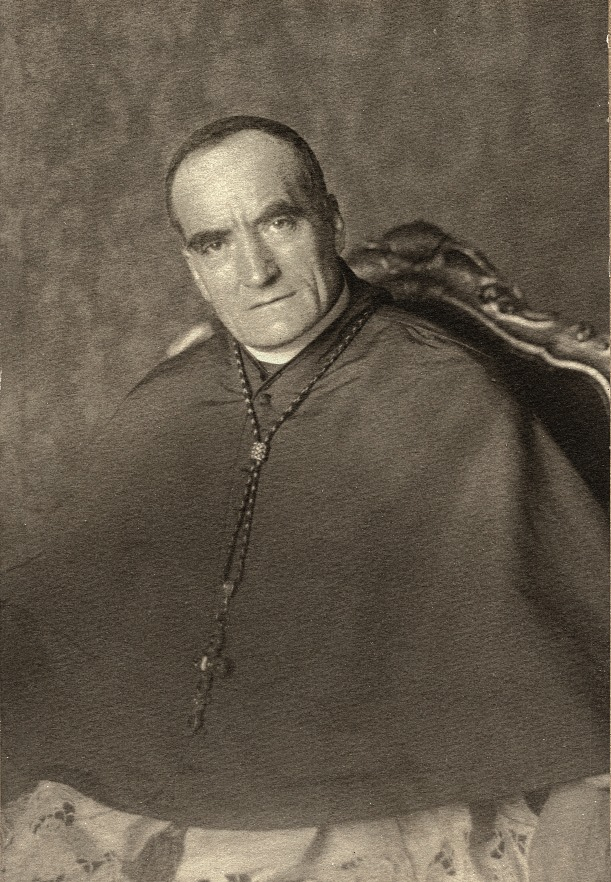
- Rossi pictured sometime in his Udine tenure.
- Church: Roman Catholic Church
- See: Constantinople
- Appointed: 19 December 1927
- Term ended: 29 March 1948
- Predecessor: Michele Zezza di Zapponeta
- Successor: Position abolished
- Other post: Bishop-Prelate of Beatissima Vergine Maria del Santissimo Rosario (1927-48)
- Previous posts: Archbishop of Udine (1910-27); Apostolic Administrator of Patti (1930-31)

Orders
- Ordination: 25 March 1887
- Consecration: 3 April 1910 by Francesco Ciceri

Personal details
- Born: Antonio Anastasio Rossi; 18 July 1864 Milan, Kingdom of Italy
- Died: 29 March 1948 (aged 83) Pompeii, Italy
- Buried: Shrine of the Virgin of the Rosary of Pompei

Antonio Anastasio Rossi (18 July 1864 – 29 March 1948) was an Italian Roman Catholic prelate.

Rossi was Archbishop of Udine from 8 January 1910 to 1927. On 19 December 1927, he was appointed Prelate of Pompei and Latin Patriarch of Constantinople, and served in those roles until his death in 1948. In the 1930s, as prelate, he expanded the Shrine of the Virgin of the Rosary of Pompei to accommodate the increasing number of pilgrims and increased its social outreach among the poor and orphans. He was the last Latin Patriarch of Constantinople: the titular see was suppressed in 1964 without a successor being appointed.

Rossi died on 29 March 1948, aged 83, and is entombed in the crypt of the Shrine of the Virgin of the Rosary of Pompeii.

== See also ==
· · ·

== Bibliography ==
- Ferrara, Antonio; Casale, Angelandrea (2012). I prelati del Pontificio Santuario di Pompei dal 1890 al 2012 : la storia, la cronotassi, i ritratti, i cenni biografici e gli emblemi araldici (in Italian). Sarno: Santuario di Pompei. ISBN 978-8885291928.
