= Domenico Sorrentino =

Italian Catholic prelate

The Most Reverend Domenico Sorrentino
- Bishop emeritus of Assisi-Nocera Umbra-Gualdo Tadino
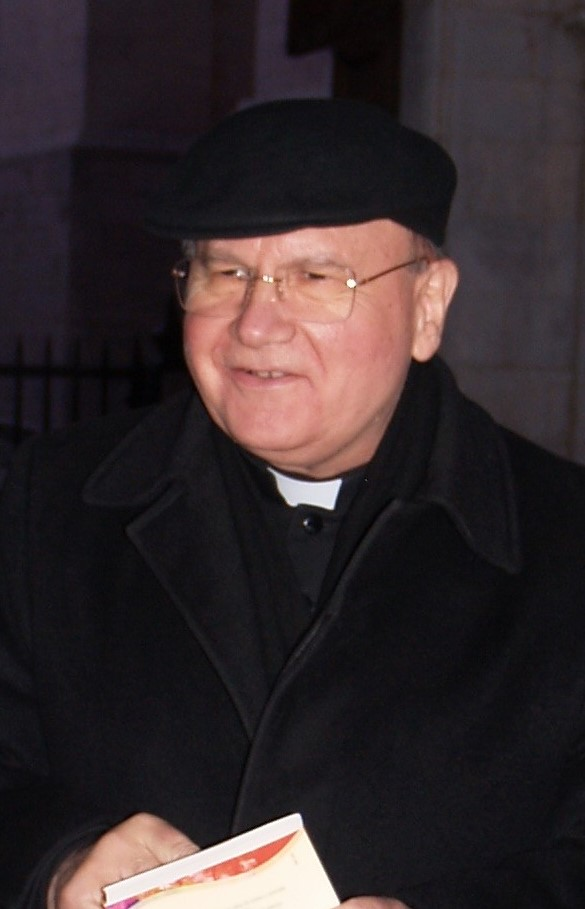
- Sorrentino in late 2017.
- Church: Roman Catholic Church
- Diocese: Assisi-Nocera Umbra-Gualdo Tadino
- See: Assisi-Nocera Umbra-Gualdo Tadino
- Appointed: 19 November 2005
- Installed: 11 February 2006
- Term ended: 10 January 2026
- Predecessor: Sergio Goretti
- Successor: Felice Accrocca
- Previous posts: Prelate of Pompei (2001-03); Secretary of the Congregation for Divine Worship and the Discipline of the Sacraments (2003-05)

Orders
- Ordination: 24 June 1972
- Consecration: 19 March 2001 by Pope John Paul II

Personal details
- Born: Domenico Sorrentino; 16 May 1948 (age 78) Boscoreale, Italy
- Education: Almo Collegio Capranica; Pontifical Gregorian University; La Sapienza University
- Motto: Abba Pater
- Coat of arms

Styles of Domenico Sorrentino
- Reference style: The Most Reverend
- Spoken style: His Excellency
- Religious style: Monsignor
- Posthumous style: not applicable

Domenico Sorrentino (born 16 May 1948) is an Italian Catholic prelate, who was the Bishop of Assisi-Nocera Umbra-Gualdo Tadino (2005–2026).

== Biography ==
He was born at Boscoreale, near Torre Annunziata and Pompei, outside Naples in Italy, in 1948. He undertook the usual seminary studies and was ordained a Catholic priest for the Diocese of Nola on 24 June 1972, having studied at the Roman ecclesiastical universities as a pupil of the Almo Collegio Capranica, an ancient Roman seminary named after Cardinal Domenico Capranica. About the same time, having left the Capranica, Sorrentino obtained a doctorate in theology from the Pontifical Gregorian University in Rome and at substantially the same time a doctorate in political science from the University of Rome La Sapienza. He followed for a number of years the normal course of appointments in his home diocese as curate and then parish priest, but after a relatively short time was appointed to diocesan responsibilities for catechetics. He was also involved in the establishment of a library centred on the figure of the church father, Paulinus of Nola. Sorrentino also became a teacher in the Institute of Religious Science at Nola and in the theological faculty at Naples.

In 1992 he obtained a position in the Secretariat of State in Rome. Sorrentino's activities as a speechwriter in the Secretariat of State brought him into contact with Stanisław Dziwisz, principal private secretary to Pope John Paul II.

He was appointed on 17 February 2001 to the rank of archbishop and the post of Prelate of Pompeii, in effect a small diocese centred on a large and popular shrine of the Virgin in the modern township of Pompei, adjacent to the ruins of the Roman town buried in ancient times by volcanic eruption. Here Sorrentino set about plans for the rearrangement of the area surrounding the shrine, the provision of road access, and the like.

Sorrentino was appointed to the post of Secretary of the Congregation for Divine Worship and the Discipline of the Sacraments, on 2 August 2003. His most recent came on 19 November 2005, when he was appointed Bishop of Assisi, keeping the personal title of archbishop. On November 28, 2020, Mgr Sorrentino and Mgr Giovanni Mosciatti, bishop of Imola, were the co-consecrators of bishop Mauro Gambetti who previously had been appointed cardinal by Pope Francis.
