= Luigi Gatti (nuncio) =

Italian prelate of the Catholic Church (born 1946)

His Excellency, The Most Reverend Luigi Gatti
- Apostolic Nuncio emeritus of Greece; Titular Archbishop of Santa Giusta
- Appointed: 16 July 2009
- Retired: 22 February 2011
- Predecessor: Patrick Coveney
- Successor: Edward Joseph Adams
- Other post: Titular Archbishop of Santa Giusta
- Previous posts: Apostolic Nuncio to Lebanon (2001-2009); Apostolic Nuncio to Libya and Malta (1998-2001)

Orders
- Ordination: 29 June 1970
- Consecration: 29 August 1998 by Angelo Sodano, Andrea Cordero Lanza di Montezemolo, and Sebastiano Dho

Personal details
- Born: November 25, 1946 (age 79) Castiglione Tinella, Cuneo, Italy

Styles of Luigi Gatti
- Reference style: His Excellency; The Most Reverend
- Spoken style: Your Excellency
- Religious style: Archbishop

Luigi Gatti (born 25 November 1946) is an Italian prelate of the Catholic Church who served as an Apostolic Nuncio from 1998 to 2011.

== Biography ==
Luigi Gatti was born on 25 November 1946 in Castiglione Tinella, Province of Cuneo, Italy. He was ordained a priest of the Diocese of Alba on 29 June 1970. He earned a doctorate in canon law.

== Diplomatic career ==
He prepared for a diplomatic career by completing the course of study at the Pontifical Ecclesiastical Academy in 1972.

He entered the diplomatic service of the Holy See in 1976 and fulfilled assignments in Paraguay and in the Secretariat of State in Rome.

On 13 June 1998, Pope John Paul II appointed him Titular Archbishop of Santa Giusta and Apostolic Nuncio to Malta and Libya. He received his episcopal consecration from Cardinal Secretary of State Angelo Sodano on 29 August.

On 28 June 2001, John Paul appointed him Apostolic Nuncio to Lebanon.

Pope Benedict XVI appointed him Apostolic Nuncio to Greece on 16 July 2009. He assignment ended with the appointment of Edward Joseph Adams as his successor on 22 February 2011.

== See also ==
- List of heads of the diplomatic missions of the Holy See
