= Félix del Blanco Prieto =

Spanish Roman Catholic prelate (1937–2021)

- Almoner of the Office of Papal Charities
- Church: Catholic Church
- In office: 28 July 2007 – 3 November 2012
- Predecessor: Oscar Rizzato
- Successor: Guido Pozzo
- Other post: Titular Archbishop of Vannida (1991-2021)
- Previous posts: Apostolic Nuncio to Libya & Malta (2003-2007); Apostolic Nuncio to Equatorial Guinea & Cameroon (1996-2003); Apostolic Delegate to Angola (1991-1996); Apostolic Pro-Nuncio to São Tomé and Príncipe (1991-1996)

Orders
- Ordination: 27 May 1961
- Consecration: 6 July 1991 by Agostino Casaroli

Personal details
- Born: 15 June 1937 Mogrovejo, Province of León, National Zone, Spanish Republic
- Died: 10 April 2021 (aged 83) Rome, Italy

Félix del Blanco Prieto (15 June 1937 – 10 April 2021) was a Spanish prelate of the Catholic Church who spent his career in the diplomatic service of the Holy See, including stints heading the missions in countries such as Angola and Malta among other countries. He was then appointed Almoner of the office of Papal Charities in 2007 and retired from the same position in 2012.

== Biography ==
=== Early life ===
Félix del Blanco Prieto was born in Morgovejo, Castilla y León, Spain, on 15 June 1937.

=== Career ===
He was ordained a priest on 27 May 1961.

He served as secretary to Secretary of State Cardinal Agostino Casaroli.

On 31 May 1991, Pope John Paul II named him a titular archbishop, Apostolic Pro-Nuncio to São Tomé and Príncipe, and Apostolic Delegate to Angola. He received his episcopal consecration from Cardinal Agostino Casaroli on 6 July 1991.

On 5 May 1996, Pope John Paul appointed him Apostolic Nuncio to Cameroon, adding the title Apostolic Nuncio to Equatorial Guinea on 28 June.

On 5 June 2003, Pope John Paul named him Apostolic Nuncio to Malta and added the title Apostolic Nuncio to Libya on 24 June.

On 28 July 2007, Pope Benedict XVI named him Papal Almoner.

Pope Benedict accepted his resignation on 3 November 2012.

=== Death ===
He died in Rome’s Gemelli Polyclinic on 10 April 2021 at the age of 83. Pope Francis was present at Monsignor Felix del Blanco Prieto's private funeral. The funeral service commenced at 12 noon and was officiated by the Cardinal Pietro Parolin, Vatican Secretary of State, at the Altar of the Chair in Saint Peter’s Basilica.

== See also ==
- Apostolic Nunciature
- Apostolic Nuncio
- List of diplomatic missions of the Holy See
