= Edward Joseph Adams =

American prelate of the Catholic Church

His Excellency, The Most Reverend Edward Joseph Adams
- Apostolic Nuncio emeritus to Great Britain; Titular Archbishop of Scala
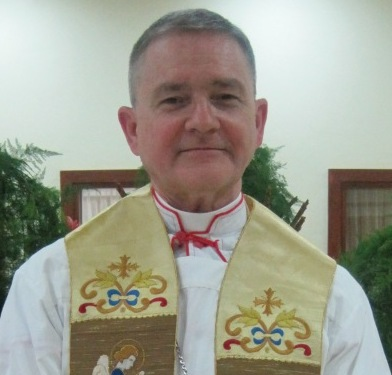
- Archbishop Adams in 2009
- Church: Roman Catholic Church
- See: Scala
- Appointed: April 8, 2017
- Retired: January 31, 2020
- Predecessor: Antonio Mennini
- Successor: Claudio Gugerotti
- Other post: Titular Archbishop of Scala
- Previous posts: Apostolic Nuncio to Greece (2011-2017); Apostolic Nuncio to the Philippines (2007-2011); Apostolic Nuncio to Zimbabwe (2002–2007); Apostolic Nuncio to Bangladesh (1996-2002)

Orders
- Ordination: May 16, 1970 by John Joseph Cardinal Krol
- Consecration: October 23, 1996 by Angelo Cardinal Sodano
- Rank: Titular Archbishop

Personal details
- Born: August 24, 1944 (age 82) Philadelphia, Pennsylvania, US
- Denomination: Roman Catholic
- Education: Villanova University; St. Charles Theological Seminary; Pontifical Ecclesiastical Academy
- Motto: In Cruce Salus (In the cross is salvation)
- Coat of arms

Styles of Edward Joseph Adams
- Reference style: His Excellency
- Spoken style: Your Excellency
- Religious style: Archbishop

Edward Joseph Adams (born August 24, 1944) is an American prelate of the Roman Catholic Church who has served in the diplomatic service of the Holy See since 1976. He was the apostolic nuncio to Great Britain from 2017 to 2020 and held earlier postings in Greece, Asia, Africa and Central America.

== Early life ==
Adams was born in Philadelphia, Pennsylvania, on August 24, 1944. After his elementary education in Catholic grammar schools, he attended St. Joseph's Preparatory School at Villanova University and St. Charles Borromeo Seminary, both in Philadelphia.

Adams was ordained a priest on May 16, 1970, by Cardinal John Krol. Adams graduated from the Pontifical Ecclesiastical Academy in Rome with a degree in canon law in 1976.

== Diplomatic service ==
Adams entered the diplomatic service of the Holy See on March 8, 1976. He held positions in the office of the Secretary of State and in Rwanda, Kenya, Honduras, the Republic of Ireland, Denmark and the Czech Republic.

Adams was appointed apostolic nuncio to Bangladesh and titular archbishop of Scala, on August 24, 1996. He was consecrated on October 23, 1996, in Rome by Cardinal Angelo Sodano, the papal secretary of state. His principal co-consecrators were Cardinal Anthony Bevilacqua and Cardinal John Foley.

After six years in Bangladesh, Adams was named apostolic nuncio to Zimbabwe on August 22, 2002 On September 3, 2007, he was appointed apostolic nuncio to the Philippines.

On February 22, 2011, Adams was appointed papal nuncio to Greece and on April 8, 2017, he was named to replace Archbishop Antonio Mennini as apostolic nuncio to Great Britain. Adams' title refers to "Great Britain" rather than "United Kingdom" because the nuncio has no role in Northern Ireland, a part of the United Kingdom. The Catholic Church in Northern Ireland is administered locally, with its apostolic nuncio based in Dublin.

In February 2019, the Guardian reported that Adams received repeated requests for information to the Independent Inquiry into Child Sexual Abuse (ICSA) held by the British Government. Adams did send a response to the Foreign and Commonwealth Office because he said that was the appropriate channel. On October 5, 2019, an ICSA member was quoted by The Tablet as saying that the Holy See told ICSA that "the domestic laws and internal proceedings of a foreign sovereign entity are not the proper object for a British inquiry".

Pope Francis accepted Adam's resignation as apostolic nuncio to Great Britain on January 31, 2020.

== Honors ==
- Commander of the Order of the Dannebrog, July 23, 1993.
- Grand Cross ('Μεγαλόσταυρος'), Order of the Phoenix (Greece), May 16, 2017.

== See also ==
- List of heads of the diplomatic missions of the Holy See

Catholic Church titles
Preceded by George Pell as Titular Bishop of Scala	Titular Archbishop of Scala; August 24, 1996–present	Incumbent
Diplomatic posts
Preceded by Adriano Bernardini	Apostolic Nuncio to Bangladesh; August 24, 1996 – August 22, 2002	Succeeded by Paul Tschang In-Nam
Preceded by Peter Paul Prabhu	Apostolic Nuncio to Zimbabwe; August 22, 2002 – September 3, 2007	Succeeded by George Kocherry
Preceded by Fernando Filoni	Apostolic Nuncio to the Philippines; September 3, 2007 – February 22, 2011	Succeeded by Giuseppe Pinto
Preceded by Luigi Gatti	Apostolic Nuncio to Greece; February 22, 2011 – April 8, 2017	Succeeded by Savio Tai Fai Hon
Preceded by Antonio Mennini	Apostolic Nuncio to Great Britain; April 8, 2017 – January 31, 2020	Succeeded by Claudio Gugerotti
