= Shrine of the Virgin of the Rosary of Pompei =

Catholic cathedral and shrine in Pompei, Italy

Pontifical Shrine of the Blessed Virgin of the Rosary of Pompei Pontificio Santuario della Beata Vergine del Santo Rosario di Pompei
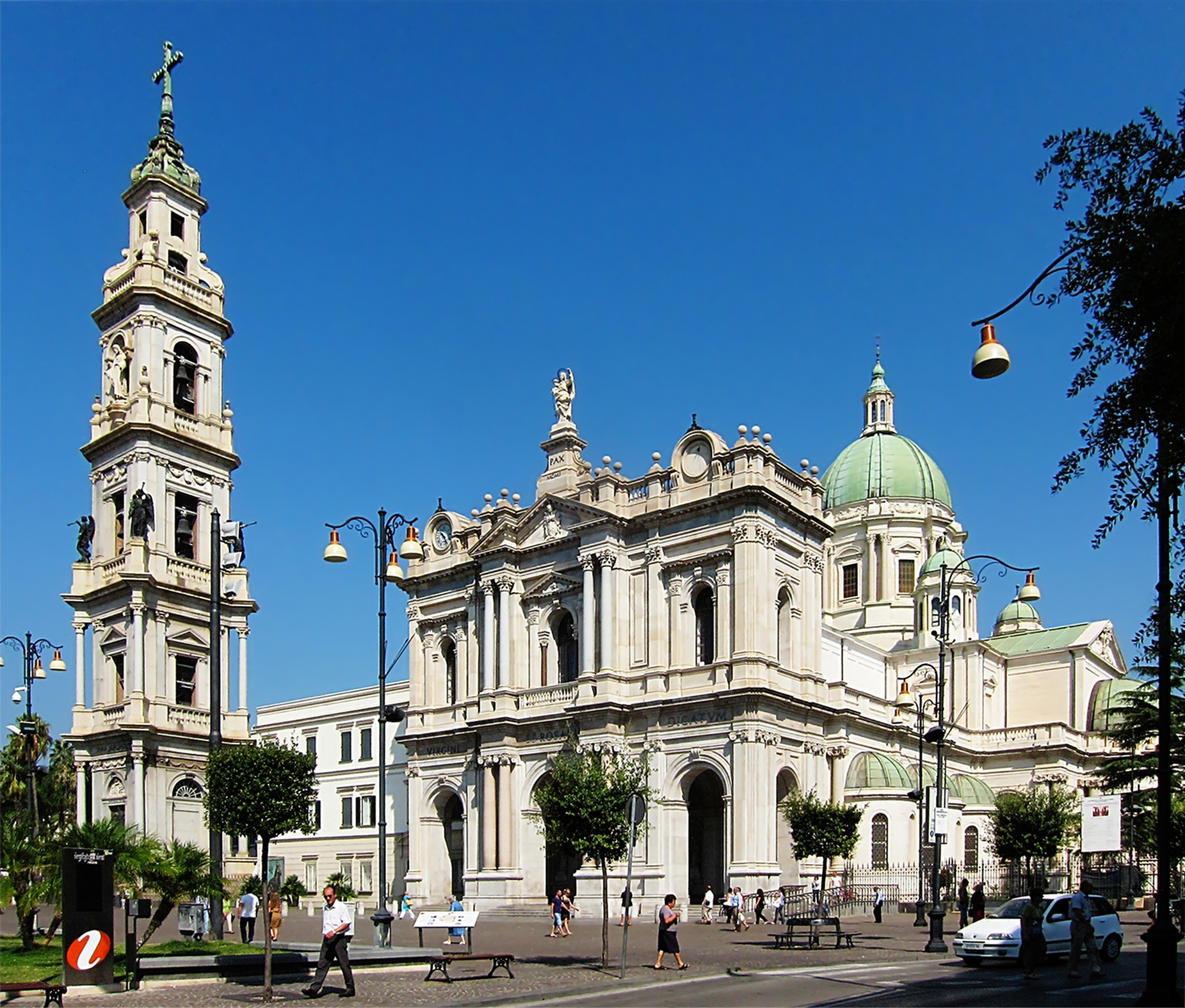
- The shrine dedicated to the Blessed Virgin Mary

Religion
- Affiliation: Catholic
- Province: Territorial Prelature of Pompei
- Rite: Latin Church
- Ecclesiastical or organisational status: Cathedral, Pontifical minor basilica, Marian pontifical shrine
- Leadership: Tommaso Caputo
- Year consecrated: 1901

Location
- Location: Pompei, Italy
- Interactive map of Pontifical Shrine of the Blessed Virgin of the Rosary of Pompei; Pontificio Santuario della Beata Vergine del Santo Rosario di Pompei
- Coordinates: 40°45′0″N 14°30′2″E

Architecture
- Architects: Antonio Cua, Spirito Maria Chiappetta
- Type: Church
- Style: Neoclassical architecture
- Groundbreaking: 1876
- Completed: 1901

Specifications
- Direction of façade: S
- Capacity: 6000
- Length: 95 m (312 ft)
- Width: 55 m (180 ft)
- Width (nave): 30 m (98 ft)
- Height (max): 57 m (187 ft)
- Materials: Masonry, reinforced concrete

Website
- www.santuario.it

The Pontifical Shrine of the Blessed Virgin of the Rosary of Pompei (Italian: Pontificio Santuario della Beata Vergine del Santo Rosario di Pompei) is a Catholic cathedral, Marian pontifical shrine, and Pontifical minor basilica commissioned and co-founded by Bartolo Longo and his wife the Countess Mariana di Fusco, located in Pompei, Italy. It is the see of the Territorial Prelature of Pompei.

== History ==
Bartolo Longo started restoring a church in disrepair in October 1873 and promoted a festival in honor of Our Lady of the Rosary. In 1875, Longo obtained a painting of Our Lady of the Rosary from a convent in Naples and raised funds to restore the image so as to locate it in the church. Miracles began to be reported and pilgrims began flocking in droves to the church. Three hundred people of the area pledged a penny a month for the work. Bartolo Longo was encouraged by Giuseppe Formisano, Bishop of Nola, to begin the construction of a larger church—the cornerstone being laid on the 8 May 1876. The church was consecrated on the 7 May 1891 by Cardinal Raffaele Monaco La Valletta, representing Pope Leo XIII.

Pope Benedict XVI presented his sixth Golden Rose to the shrine on the 19 October 2008.

== Our Lady of the Rosary ==
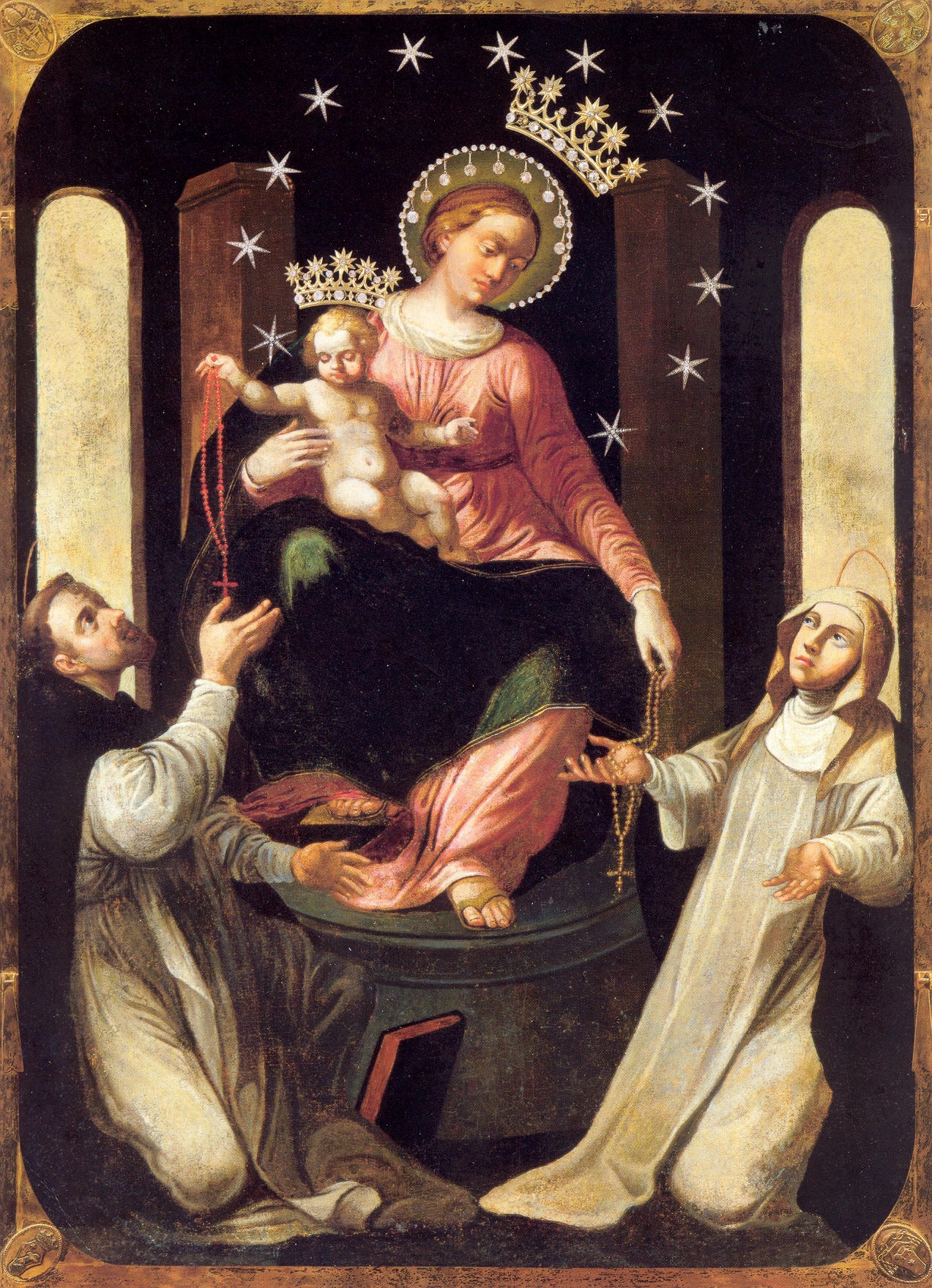
Painting of our Lady of the Rosary venerated in Pompeii.

The painting of "Our Lady of the Rosary" with its bronze gilt frame is presented to the pilgrims on the high altar. The venerated painting depicts the Virgin Mary and Child Jesus presenting rosaries to Saint Dominic and Saint Catherine of Siena. Originally bought by Dominican priest Alberto Radente for eight carlini in Naples, it was offered to Bartolo Longo on the 13 November 1875 for the church he was building in Pompei.

An attempt was made by an amateur to restore it, and it was placed in the church on 13 February 1876, the foundation day for the Confraternity of the Holy Rosary there. In 1880 the famous Italian painter, Federico Madlarelli, offered to restore the image. It was again finally restored by Vatican artists in 1965.

Bartolo Longo composed the "Novena of Petition" in July 1879, testing it by himself while he suffered from typhoid fever. The text was inspired by a daily vision of a miraculous portrait of Our Lady of the Rosary, to which the Novena was first dedicated in Pompeii.

The full Prayer consists in a daily pronunciation of at least three decades (three Holy Mysteries) of the Rosary each day followed by the Novena. It takes 54 days of time, without interruption.

On 23 April 1965, the painting was personally crowned by Pope Paul VI.

In November 2024, Pope Francis wrote a letter timed to co-incide with the 150 year sesqui-centenary anniversary of the arrival of the painting at Pompeii in 1875. The letter generated reports in all of the main catholic news services globally.

== Architecture ==
The original building built between 1876 and 1891 and designed by Antonio Cua followed a Latin cross plan. It was only 420 square metres (4,500 sq ft). The construction of the façade, work of Giovanni Rispoli, started on the 15 May 1893. The facade culminates with the statue of the Virgin of the Rosary (18,000 kg (40,000 lb), 3.25 m (10.7 ft)), work of Gaetano Chiaromonte, carved from a single block of Carrara marble, beneath which are placed the word "PAX" and the year "MCMI" (1901).

To accommodate the increasing numbers of pilgrims, the sanctuary was expanded between 1934 and 1939 from one to three aisles, keeping its Latin cross plan. The project was ordered by Prelate Antonio Anastasio Rossi and designed by the architect-priest Monsignor Spirito Maria Chiapetta. Each new aisle has three altars on each side. The new building with its 2,000 square metres (22,000 sq ft) can accommodate up to 6,000 people.

The 80-metre (260 ft) bell tower built between 1912 and 1925 was designed by Aristide Leonori, assisted by his brother Pio Leonori.

== Burials ==
- Bartolo Longo
- Antonio Anastasio Rossi the Prelate of Pompeii and Latin Patriarch of Constantinople from 1927 until 1948.

== See also ==
- Shrines to the Virgin Mary
- Catholic Marian church buildings
- Rosarium Virginis Mariae

== Notes ==
=== Bibliography ===
- Cruz, Joan Carroll (1984). Relics. Huntington, Ind.: Our Sunday Visitor. p. 88. ISBN 978-0-87973-701-6.
- Carillo, Saverio; Sepe, Vincenzo; Petillo, Pasquale (2010). "The Huge Enlargement with R.C. Structure of the Shrine of Pompeii in Italy (1933-1939): A Technological, Architectonic and Cultural Challenge". IABSE Symposium, Venice 2010: Large Structures and Infrastructures for Environmentally Constrained and Urbanised Areas (PDF) (Conference paper). Venice. pp. 802–809. doi:10.2749/222137810796063896. ISBN 978-3-85748-122-2.
