= Aldo Cavalli =

Italian prelate of the Catholic Church

His Excellency, The Most Reverend Aldo Cavalli
- Archbishop and Apostolic Nuncio
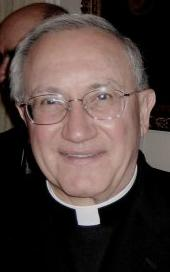
- Church: Roman Catholic Church
- Other post: Archbishop of Vibo Valentia (1996-)

Orders
- Ordination: 18 March 1971 by Clemente Gaddi
- Consecration: 26 August 1996 by Angelo Sodano, Roberto Amadei, and Angelo Paravisi

Personal details
- Born: Aldo Cavalli; 18 October 1946 (age 80)

Styles of Aldo Cavalli
- Reference style: The Most Reverend
- Spoken style: Your Excellency
- Religious style: Archbishop

Aldo Cavalli (born 18 October 1946) is an Italian prelate of the Catholic Church who joined the diplomatic service of the Holy See in 1979 and served as an apostolic nuncio from 1996 to 2021. In November 2021 he became Apostolic Visitor to Medjugorje. He has been an archbishop since 1996.

== Biography ==
Cavalli was born in Lecco, Italy, on 18 October 1946. On 18 March 1971, he was ordained a priest in Bergamo. He then taught literature for several years at a seminary while he studied political science and social sciences. In 1975 he began his studies in diplomacy at the Pontifical Ecclesiastical Academy. He studied canon law and theology and completed a degree in political science.

Cavalli joined the diplomatic service of the Holy See on 15 April 1979 and fulfilled assignments in Burundi, Angola and São Tomé and Príncipe, Chile, Colombia, Libya, and Malta.

Cavalli was named Apostolic Delegate to Angola, Apostolic Nuncio to São Tomé and Principe, and titular archbishop of Vibo Valentia on 2 July 1996 by Pope John Paul II. He received his episcopal consecration from Cardinal Angelo Sodano on 26 August. His title in Angola changed to Apostolic Nuncio on 1 September 1997.

On 28 June 2001, Pope John Paul II named him Apostolic Nuncio to Chile.

On 29 October 2007, Pope Benedict XVI named him Apostolic Nuncio to Colombia. In April 2011, he spoke out against proposed legislation in Colombia to legalize the adoption of children by same-sex couples.

On 16 February 2013, Pope Benedict XVI named him Apostolic Nuncio to Malta, and on 13 April Pope Francis added the responsibilities of Apostolic Nuncio to Libya. (Note: Since 1995, the Holy See has appointed its Nuncio to Malta its Nuncio to Libya as well.)

On 21 March 2015 Pope Francis appointed him Apostolic Nuncio to the Netherlands. On 3 July 2015 he presented his credentials as Ambassador Extraordinary and Plenipotentiary to the Organisation for the Prohibition of Chemical Weapons.

On 27 November 2021, Pope Francis appointed him special Apostolic Visitor to the parish of Medjugorje. Pope Leo XIV accepted his resignation from that post on 31 October 2026.
