= Apostolic Nunciature to Luxembourg =

Diplomatic post of the Holy See

The Apostolic Nunciature to Luxembourg is an ecclesiastical office of the Catholic Church in Luxembourg. It is a diplomatic post of the Holy See, whose representative is called the Apostolic Nuncio with the rank of an ambassador. The title Apostolic Nuncio to Luxembourg is held by the prelate appointed Apostolic Nuncio to Belgium; he resides in Brussels.

Pope Leo XIII established the Apostolic Internunciature to Luxembourg in January 1891 (Note: The independence of Luxembourg developed in the course of the 18th century. From the perspective of the Holy See, which had traditionally sent it representatives to the royal or noble rulers of a state, the key development was the separation of the ruling houses in 1890, when the Dutch monarchy ceased to hold the title Grand-Duke of Luxembourg. Beginning with Adolph of Nassau-Weilburg, the Grand-Duchy had its own monarchy, which reaffirmed its full independence.) and Pope Pius XII raised it to the status of Apostolic Nunciature to Luxembourg on 24 October 1955.

== Papal representatives to Luxembourg ==
Apostolic Internuncios

Appointments before 1946 are not well documented. (Note: Two self-published sources provide conflicting information about appointments before 1946, and the standard source, Acta Apostolicae Sedis, does not report the appointment of an apostolic internuncio to Luxembourg before 1946.)

- Fernando Cento (9 March 1946 – 26 October 1953)
- Efrem Forni (9 November 1953 – 19 March 1962)

Apostolic Nuncios

- Silvio Oddi (17 May 1962 – 28 April 1969)
- Igino Eugenio Cardinale (9 May 1969 – 24 March 1983)
- Angelo Pedroni (6 July 1983 – 13 June 1989)
- Giovanni Moretti (15 July 1989 – 3 March 1999)
- Pier Luigi Celata (3 March 1999 – 14 November 2002)
- Karl-Josef Rauber (22 February 2003 – 24 July 2009)
- Giacinto Berloco (24 July 2009 – September 2016)
- Augustine Kasujja (7 December 2016 – 31 August 2021)
- Franco Coppola (14 December 2021 – 5 November 2026)
