= Angelo Pedroni (nuncio) =

Italian prelate of the Catholic Church

- Apostolic Nuncio to Belgium, Luxembourg & the European Community
- Church: Catholic Church
- In office: 6 July 1983 – 13 June 1989
- Predecessor: Igino Eugenio Cardinale
- Successor: Giovanni Moretti (as Nuncio to Belgium & Luxembourg); Faustino Sainz Muñoz (as Nuncio to the European Community)
- Other post: Titular Archbishop of Novica (1965-1992)
- Previous posts: Apostolic Pro-Nuncio to Syria (1975-1983); Apostolic Nuncio to Costa Rica (1969-1975); Apostolic Delegate to Thailand, Laos and the Malacca Peninsula(1965-1967)

Orders
- Ordination: 13 March 1937
- Consecration: 22 May 1965 by Giovanni Colombo

Personal details
- Born: 22 April 1914 Maccagno, Province of Como, Kingdom of Italy
- Died: 24 June 1992 (aged 78)

Angelo Pedroni (22 April 1914 – 24 June 1992) was a prelate of the Catholic Church who worked in the diplomatic service of the Holy See, with the title of nuncio from 1965 until his retirement in 1989 and the rank of archbishop from 1965 until his death.

== Biography ==
Angelo Pedroni was born in Maccagno, Varese, Italy, on 22 April 1914. He earned his licentiate in theology at the Pontifical Gregorian University. He was ordained a priest on 13 March 1937 and served as parish priest at Saints Nabor and Felix in Milan for five years. He received his doctorate in jurisprudence in 1942 and a doctorate in canon law from the Pontifical Gregorian University in 1944. To prepare for a diplomatic career he entered the Pontifical Ecclesiastical Academy in 1945. His assignments in the diplomatic service of the Holy See included Cairo until 1951; a stint in Paris in 1952–3 as secretary to the nuncio, Angelo Roncalli, the future Pope John XXIII; Rome as secretary to the committee for the Marian year 1954 followed by a few years at the Secretariat of State. On 4 November 1960, he was named Permanent Observer of the Holy See to UNESCO (Paris).

On 7 April 1965, Pope Paul VI appointed him Titular Archbishop of Novica and Apostolic Delegate to Thailand, Laos, and the Malacca Peninsula. He received his episcopal consecration from Cardinal Giovanni Colombo in the Basilica of Sant'Ambrogio in Milan on 22 May.

In 1967, Pedroni worked in the Secretariat of State in Rome. On 19 July 1969, Pope Paul appointed him Apostolic Nuncio to Costa Rica. On 15 March 1975 Pope Paul named him Apostolic Pro-Nuncio to Syria.

On 6 July 1983, Pope John Paul II appointed him Apostolic Nuncio to Belgium, Luxembourg, and the European Community.

On 13 June 1989, Pope John Paul accepted his resignation, which he had submitted for reasons of age after turning 75.

== Writings ==
- Il consenso matrimoniale e la teoria della simulazione [Marital consent and simulation theory] (in Italian). Rome: Pontifical Gregorian University. 1949.
