= Faustino Sainz Muñoz =

Spanish prelate of the Roman Catholic Church

The Most Reverend Faustino Sainz Muñoz
- Apostolic Nuncio to Great Britain
- In office: 11 December 2004 - 18 December 2010
- Predecessor: Pablo Puente Buces
- Successor: Antonio Mennini

Orders
- Ordination: 19 December 1964
- Consecration: 18 December 1988 by Agostino Casaroli
- Rank: Titular Archbishop

Personal details
- Born: 5 June 1937 Almadén, Spain
- Died: 31 October 2012 (aged 75) Madrid, Spain
- Denomination: Roman Catholic

Styles of Faustino Sainz Muñoz
- Reference style: The Most Reverend
- Spoken style: Your Excellency
- Religious style: Monsignor
- Posthumous style: not applicable

Faustino Sainz Muñoz (5 June 1937 – 31 October 2012) was a Spanish prelate of the Roman Catholic Church. He served as the Nuncio to Great Britain from 2004 until December 2010, having been appointed by Pope John Paul II in 2004.

== Career ==
Born in Almadén, Ciudad Real Province, Faustino Sainz Muñoz was ordained to the priesthood on 19 December 1964. He entered the diplomatic service of the Holy See in 1970, serving in the Pontifical Representations in Senegal and Scandinavia, and then in the Council of Public Affairs of the Church of the Vatican Secretariat of State. As a junior diplomat in Finland, he was dispatched as part of the Holy See's delegation to the preparatory talks of the Commission on Security and Cooperation in Europe (CSCE) in 1975; the delegation diligently ensured that religious freedom was included in the Helsinki Accords. Upon his returning to the Vatican that same year, Sainz was made the Holy See's liaison with Poland, Hungary, and later the Soviet Union and Yugoslavia.

He traveled to Latin America in 1978, where he accompanied Antonio Cardinal Samoré in successfully averting war between Chile and Argentina over the Beagle conflict. Sainz, who accompanied Pope John Paul on his visit to his native Poland in June 1979, described the crowd's applause during the Pope's homily at a Mass on Victory Square in Warsaw as "an image that [he] cannot forget ... it was the beginning of the end of Communism in Poland".

On 29 October 1988, he was appointed Pro-Nuncio to Cuba and Titular Archbishop of Novaliciana by John Paul. Sainz received his episcopal consecration on the following 18 December (a day before his twenty-fourth anniversary of priestly ordination) from Agostino Cardinal Casaroli, with Ángel Cardinal Suquía Goicoechea and Archbishop Maximino Romero de Lema serving as co-consecrators. While in this post, he held many discussions with Fidel Castro about episcopal cooperation in improving the position of the Cuban Church and the welfare of the Cuban people.

Sainz was named nuncio to the Democratic Republic of the Congo on 7 October 1992 (offering the nunciature as a place of relief and refuge to those persecuted during the Rwandan genocide), to the European Community on 22 January 1999, and to Great Britain on 11 December 2004.

On 16 May 2010, Sainz Muñoz suffered a mild stroke. He received medical care in hospital in Spain. Despite this, the archbishop was present when Pope Benedict XVI arrived at Edinburgh airport, being the first to welcome him, and being present throughout the papal visit which occurred in September 2010. On 12 November 2010, Archbishop Faustino Sainz Muñoz announced his retirement as papal nuncio to Great Britain during the thanksgiving Mass for the papal visit at St Mary's Cathedral in Edinburgh. On 2 December 2010, a Mass of thanksgiving was celebrated at Westminster Cathedral, which marked the end of his role as papal nuncio to Great Britain.

== Last years ==
On 28 January 2011, the archbishop had an audience with Pope Benedict XVI. Archbishop Sainz Muñoz was diagnosed with an aggressive brain tumour, and returned to his native Spain, where he received his chemotherapy. He died there on 31 October 2012.

== Personal life ==
Archbishop Sainz Muñoz was a Real Madrid fan, and a walking and tennis enthusiast. He held a doctorate in canon law, and was awarded an honorary doctorate in laws from the University of Aberdeen on 2 July 2007. Besides his native Spanish, he spoke English, French, and Italian.

Diplomatic posts
Preceded by Giulio Einaudi	Pro-Nuncio to Cuba; 1988–1992	Succeeded by Beniamino Stella
Preceded by Alfio Rapisarda	Nuncio to the Democratic Republic of the Congo; 1992–1999	Succeeded by Francisco-Javier Lozano
Preceded by Angelo Pedroni	Nuncio to the European Union; 1999–2004	Succeeded by André Dupuy
Preceded by Pablo Puente Buces	Nuncio to Great Britain; 2004–18 December 2010	Succeeded by Antonio Mennini
