= Ganci =

Ganci is an Italian surname. Notable people with the surname include:

- Peter J. Ganci, Jr. (1946–2001), American firefighter
- Raffaele Ganci (1932–2022), Sicilian Mafiosi
- Marco Ganci (born 1976), Italian clergyman and diplomat
- Massimo Ganci (born 1981) Italian footballer
