= Sebastiano Nicotra =

Italian prelate

- Titular Archbishop of Heraclea in Europa
- Church: Catholic Church
- In office: 18 December 1916 – 21 May 1929
- Predecessor: Andreas Frühwirth
- Successor: Francesco Borgongini Duca
- Previous posts: Apostolic Nuncio to Portugal (1923-1928); Apostolic Internuncio to Luxembourg & the Netherlands (1918-1923); Apostolic Nuncio to Belgium(1918-1923); Apostolic Nuncio to Chile (1916-1918); Apostolic Internuncio to Chile (1916)

Orders
- Ordination: 21 December 1878
- Consecration: 6 January 1917 by Pope Benedict XV

Personal details
- Born: 31 August 1855 Sant'Alfio, Kingdom of the Two Sicilies
- Died: 21 May 1929 (aged 73) Sant'Alfio, Kingdom of Italy

Sebastiano Nicotra (31 August 1855 – 21 May 1929) was an Italian prelate of the Catholic Church who served in the diplomatic service of the Holy See. From 1916 to 1929 he was an apostolic nuncio with the rank of archbishop.

== Biography ==
Sebastiano Nicotra was born on 31 August 1855 in San Alfio di Giarre, Italy. He earned a degree in canon law at the Almo Collegio Capranica. He was ordained a priest on 21 December 1878.

He joined the diplomatic service of the Holy See in 1889 and served as secretary in the apostolic nunciature to Belgium. In 1900 he became auditor in the Bavaria and then an advisor in the nunciature in Austria-Hungary in Vienna.

On 16 December 1916, Pope Benedict XV appointed him titular archbishop of Heraclea in Europa and Apostolic Nuncio to Chile. He received his episcopal consecration on 6 January 1917 from Pope Benedict.

On 1 October 1918, Pope Benedict named him Apostolic Nuncio to Belgium. For six months in 1920 Nicotra was Apostolic Administrator of Eupen–Malmedy–Sankt Vith, an area on the Belgian-German border where a referendum was being held to confirm the transfer of control to Belgium. His role was that of a neutral outsider. The German-speaking priests of the territory continued to look to Germany for leadership while treating him respectfully.

On 30 May 1923, Pope Pius X appointed him Apostolic Nuncio to Portugal.

He died on 21 May 1929 at the age of 73.
