= Permanent Observer of the Holy See to the Council of Europe =

Diplomatic post of the Holy See

- Incumbent; Marco Ganci
- Nominator: Pope of the Catholic Church
- Formation: March 7, 1970; 56 years ago

The Council of Europe granted observer status to the Holy See on 7 March 1970, having maintained a lesser relationship since 1962, when the Apostolic Nuncio to Belgium was given the additional title Apostolic Delegate to the Council for Cultural Cooperation of the Council of Europe. (Note: The Holy See signed the European Cultural Convention on 10 December 1962.)

In 1970, the Holy See established a diplomatic relationship with the European Economic Community and on 10 November appointed Archbishop Eugenio Cardinale (Note: Cardinale was named Nuncio to Belgium on 19 April 1969 and the assignments to the European Economic Community and the Council of Europe were additional responsibilities.) as Nuncio to the Common Market. He was given a second charge and title as "special envoy and permanent representative to the Council of Europe, the European consultative assembly in Strasbourg". The nature and status of that position has evolved as the Vatican explored how best to manage its relationship with such international bodies and how to integrate such positions into its traditional hierarchy of representatives, delegates, and nuncios. Until 2019, Cardinale's successors representing the Holy See to the Council were not bishops, nor did they have the title nuncio or other responsibilities. Bressan in 1983 was named "Special Envoy" to the Council, and his successors were named "Special Envoy with the role of Permanent Observer" until the simpler formula was adopted in 2004: "Special Envoy, Permanent Representative". (Note: In 2019, Pope Francis gave Paolo Rudelli, the permanent observer since 2014, the title of nuncio and set in motion his ordination as a bishop, but Rudelli was replaced as permanent observer before being ordained bishop, leaving the status of the permanent observer unchanged.)

Full membership in the Council is likely precluded by the Holy See's lack of democracy and human rights guarantees. In 2007, the Holy See described its role vis-à-vis international organizations:

In accordance with its special character and mission, the Holy See ... acts as an admonishing ethical force, encouraging [the international organization] to respect, in their policies, principles of justice and solidarity which make for peaceful coexistence and co-operation between peoples. Its character is manifest in what it is, and also in what it does.

It successfully argued that the Council’s review of observer states recognize its "special mission" and remove language that said "Its lack of democratic institutions and its position on certain human rights matters makes [sic] it a special case".

Permanent Observers

- Eugenio Cardinale (10 November 1970 – 24 March 1983)
- Luigi Bressan (12 February 1983 – 3 April 1989)
- Carlo Maria Viganò (14 April 1989 – 3 April 1992)
- Celestino Migliore (14 April 1992 – 21 December 1995)
- Michael Courtney (30 December 1995 – 18 August 2000)
- Paul Gallagher (18 August 2000 – 22 January 2004)
- Vito Rallo (27 January 2004 – 12 June 2007)
- Aldo Giordano (7 June 2008 – 26 October 2013)
- Paolo Rudelli (20 September 2014. – 21 September 2019)
- Marco Ganci (21 September 2019 – 28 July 2026)
- Paul Butnaru (24 September 2026 – present)

== See also ==
- Apostolic Nunciature to the European Union
