= Igino Eugenio Cardinale =

Italian prelate

- Apostolic Nuncio to Belgium
- Church: Catholic Church
- See: Apostolic Nunciature to Belgium
- In office: 19 April 1969 – 24 March 1983
- Predecessor: Silvio Oddi
- Successor: Angelo Pedroni
- Other posts: Apostolic Nuncio to the European Community (1970-1983); Apostolic Nuncio to Luxembourg (1969-1983); Titular Archbishop of Nepte (1963-1983)
- Previous posts: Permanent Observer of the Holy See to the Council of Europe (1973-1983); Apostolic Delegate to Great Britain (1963-1969)

Orders
- Ordination: 13 July 1941
- Consecration: 20 October 1963 by Pope Paul VI

Personal details
- Born: 14 October 1916 Fondi, Province of Terra di Lavoro, Kingdom of Italy
- Died: 24 March 1983 (aged 66) Brussels, Belgium

Igino Eugenio Cardinale (14 October 1916 – 24 March 1983) was an Italian prelate of the Catholic Church who spent his career in the diplomatic service of the Holy See. He held the title of archbishop and apostolic nuncio from 1963 until his death in 1983.

== Biography ==
He was born on 14 October 1916 in Fondi in central Italy. His family had emigrated to the United States, but returned from Boston to Italy in 1918 and his father was serving in the Italian army as a cavalry officer when Igino was born. They returned after the end of the First World War and Igino spent his childhood in Boston. He studied in the United States at St. Agnes Academy in New York City and then returned to Italy and studied in seminaries in Gaeta, Salerno, Posillipo, and Rome. He was ordained a priest of the Archdiocese of Naples on 13 July 1941.

He began studying at the Pontifical Ecclesiastical Academy in 1941 and entered the diplomatic service of the Holy See in 1946 and his early postings took him to Egypt, Palestine, Transjordan, Arabia and Cyprus before returning to Rome in 1952 for health reasons. He held the title of counselor in the Secretariat of State when he was named its chief of protocol on 30 September 1961. The next year he was under secretary of the commission responsible for organizing the Second Vatican Council. His Vatican position, his enthusiasm for the new pope, and his insight into the thinking of Pope John XXIII gained through his uncle Giuseppe de Luca who was publishing the pope’s writings, had already made him an important source for the press, and after Pope John's death he provided journalists with his insider's account of both Pope John and international relations during his papacy. (Note: He appears to be the source of this anecdote, though it identifies him as chief of protocol in 1958: "It was soon apparent to those nearest him that he was not going to be an inactive Pope. Going over the speech for his coronation with Mgr. Cardinale, his chief of protocol, Pope John saw him wincing at occasional modernisms of speech. He had been trained under Pius XII, a purist in language. John looked at him over his spectacles. 'Well? What's the matter?' Hesitantly Mgr. Cardinale ventured that such phrases did not appear in Palazzi's dictionary. Pope John looked at him for a moment and then said: 'Well, if necessary we shall reform even Palazzi!'") Both during and decades after John's papacy, Cardinale linked himself and Pope John to a sympathetic view of artificial birth control.

On 4 October 1963, Pope Paul VI appointed him titular archbishop of Nepte and apostolic delegate to Great Britain, and Pope Paul consecrated him a bishop on 20 October. In that post, he succeeded in winning a reprieve for a priest dismissed as editor of a religious magazine and suspended from his priestly functions for calling the Church "patently corrupt" in an editorial. In July 1967 at Coventry, he became the first Catholic to preach in a non-Catholic English cathedral since the Reformation, though the occasion drew anti-Catholic demonstrators.

He was named nuncio to Belgium on 19 April 1969 and to Luxembourg on 9 May 1969. In addition, when the Holy See established diplomatic ties with the European Economic Community (EEC) in 1970, he was named nuncio to that international organization and "special envoy and permanent representative" to the Council of Europe, the EEC's consultative assembly in Strasbourg.

He held his title as archbishop and as nuncio to Belgium, Luxembourg, and the EEC, and as representative to the Council of Europe when he died in Brussels of a blood infection on 24 March 1983 at the age of 66.

He authored a book on Vatican diplomacy and another on its honorary decorations.
