= Collegio Alberoni =

Italian Roman Catholic seminary

Coordinates: 45.036103°N 9.725649°E

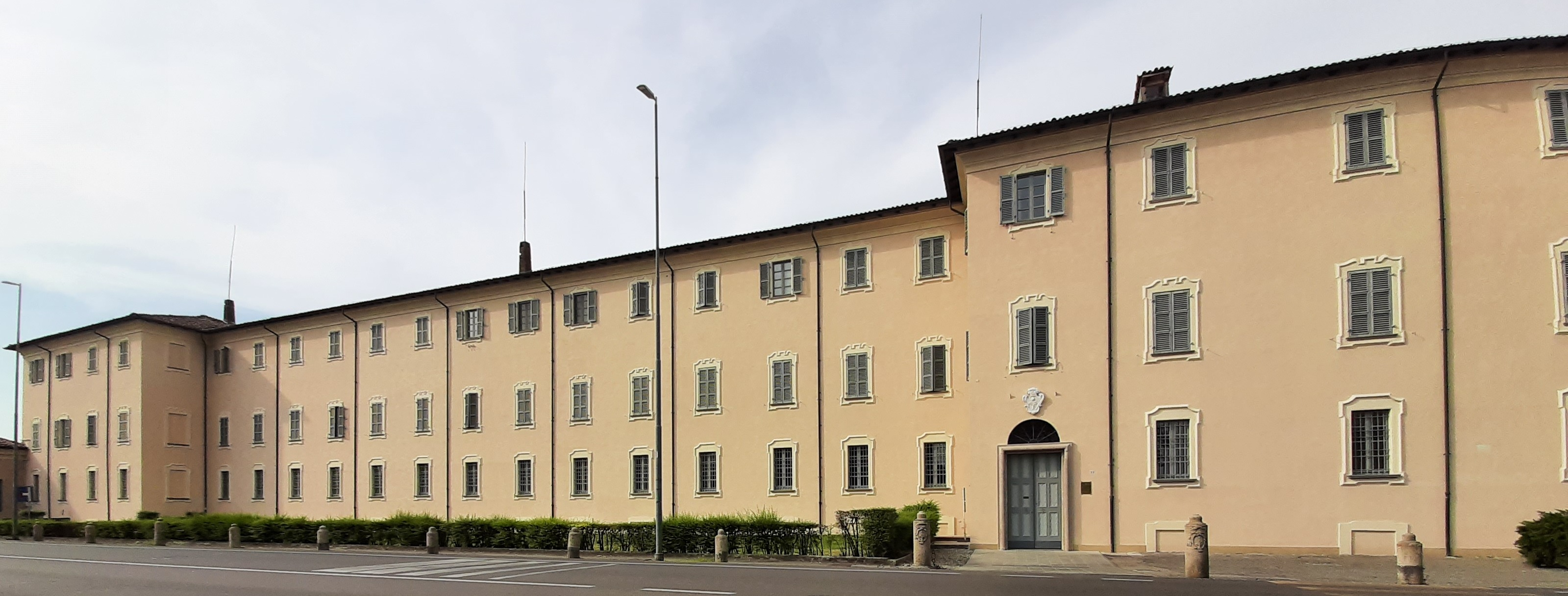

The Collegio Alberoni is a Roman Catholic seminary located on Via Emilia Parmense #77 in Piacenza, Italy. The complex also includes a prominent art gallery, Galleria Alberoni. Affiliated with the seminary are a seismic and astronomical observatory (founded 1870), a museum of natural sciences, a library, and the parish church of San Lazzaro e San Vincenzo De Paoli.

The institution was endowed by the Cardinal Giulio Alberoni (1664-1742); construction began in 1732, and the seminary opened in 1751. In 1746, during the War of Austrian Succession, the structures of the time were nearly razed. It is now administered by the Congregation of the Mission, also known as Vicentines.

The mission of the seminary as set forth by Alberoni was to provide for the subsidized education of the clerics for the diocese of Piacenza. Among its objectives were an "education in divinity", "virtuous orientation' for which the alumni should demonstrate docility, and a realistic capacity to work for the common good, respect for the property of the college, distance from secularism, and the capacity to disrobe the spirit of the word, and garner those of Christ. Admission was by contest. Studies lasted 8 years and included humanistic disciplines such as philosophy and morals. The institution rapidly adapted to an enlightened education, including scientific methods.

== Galleria Alberoni ==
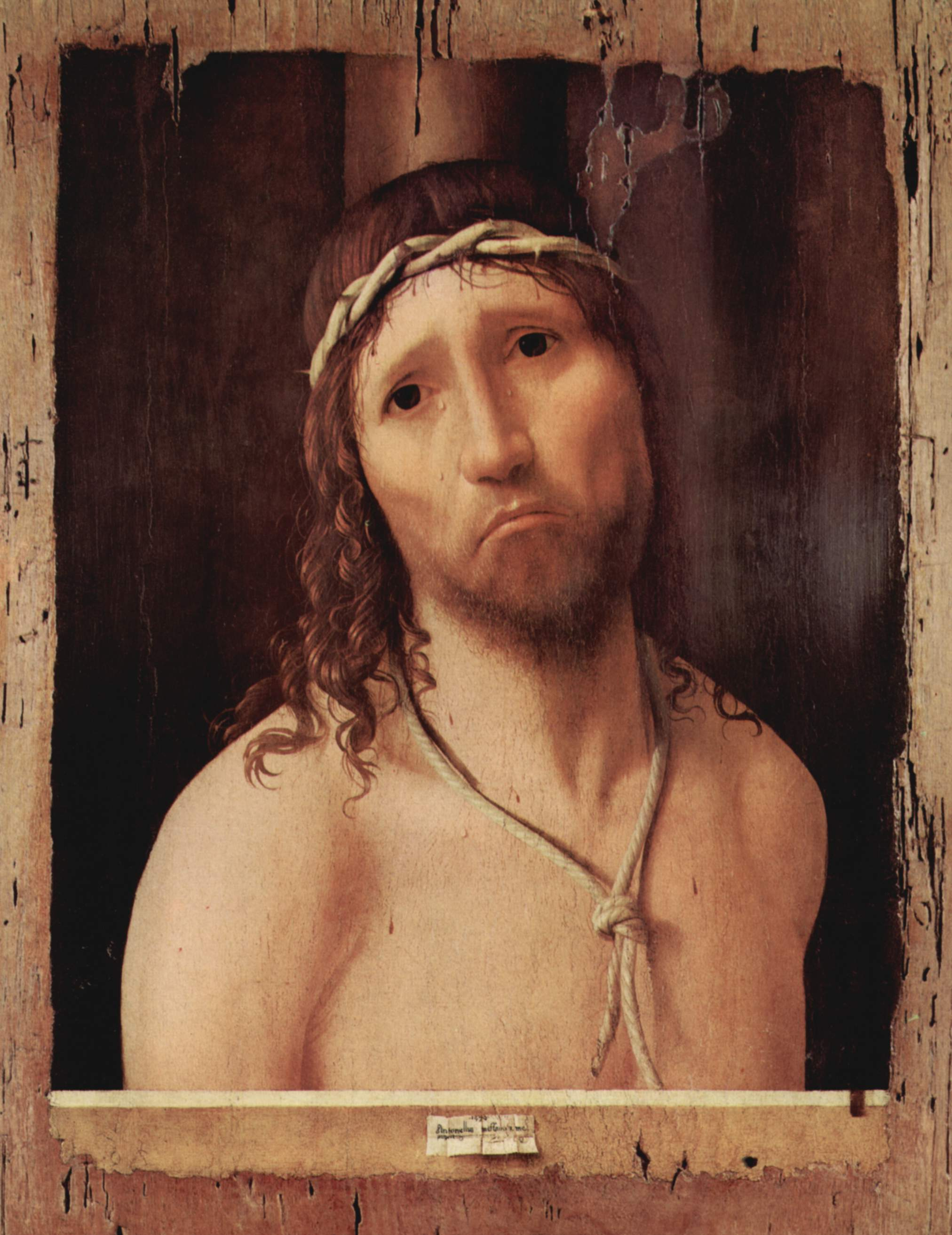
Ecce Homo (circa 1473) by Antonello da Messina

The small art gallery, derived mainly from the collections of the Cardinal Alberoni. The exhibition space was refurbished and modernized in the 1960s by the architect Vittorio Gandolfi. The gallery is open on Sundays from 15:30 to 18:00 during October to June. Among the masterworks are: an Ecce Homo by Antonello da Messina, a diptych by Jan Provost, and paintings by Luca Giordano and Guido Reni) (in the Cardinal's apartment); as well as Giovanni Paolo Panini; Giovanni Battista Lenardi; Cristoforo Serra; Domenico Maria Viani; Sebastiano Conca; Sebastiano Martinez; and Italian genre artists.

Among the latter are works by Bartolomeo Arbotori (1594–1676); Antonio Gianlisi junior (1677–1727); Marc’Antonio Rizzi (1648–1723); Ludovico Stern (1709–1777), Eberhart Keilhau (1624–1687); David de Coninck (1643–1701); Gaspard Dughet (1615–1675); Micco Spadaro (1609/10-1675); and Jacques Courtois, also called il Borgognone (1621–1670). The collection displays 18 large tapestries, including two 16th-century Flemish tapestries. Among them are works weaved by the studio of Michel Wauters of Antwerp circa 1670 based on sketches by Giovanni Francesco Romanelli and some from Brussels, circa 1650, perhaps Jan Leyniers, and apparently based on sketches by Jacob Jordaens.
