= Foreign Office papal visit memo =

2010 internal British ministry memo

- Created: April 2010
- Author(s): Steven Mulvain and Anjoum Noorani

In April 2010 in the United Kingdom two Foreign Office civil servants distributed an internal Foreign Office papal visit memo related to Pope Benedict XVI's visit to the United Kingdom containing remarks insulting to the Pope. The incident received wide media coverage and speculation, later denied, that the Pope might cancel the state visit. The memo suggested that Pope Benedict XVI, during his visit, could launch a range of branded condoms, visit an abortion clinic, bless a gay marriage and apologise for the Spanish Armada. The cover note to the memo read "Please protect; these should not be shared externally. The 'ideal visit' paper in particular was the product of a brainstorm which took into account even the most far-fetched of ideas."

The civil servants found to be responsible for sending the memo were Steven Mulvain, 23, the memo's main author, and Anjoum Noorani, 31, who authorised its circulation. It is thought that others were part of the team who drew up this memo. According to The Times, Steven Mulvain once described his hobby as "drinking a lot".

The Foreign Secretary, David Miliband, stated that he was "appalled" by the memo, and the British government apologised to the Pope and the Catholic Church, stating that the memo writer had been told orally and in writing that this was a serious error of judgment, adding that "this is clearly a foolish document that does not in any way reflect UK government or Foreign Office policy or views. Many of the ideas in the document are clearly ill-judged, naïve and disrespectful" and that "the Foreign Office very much regrets this incident and is deeply sorry for the offence which it has caused". Scottish Secretary Jim Murphy added: "These memos are vile, they're insulting, they're an embarrassment and, on behalf of, I think, the whole of the United Kingdom, I want to apologise to His Holiness the Pope." The British ambassador to the Vatican, Francis Campbell, met senior officials of the Holy See to express regret on behalf of the government.

The Foreign Office employees responsible for the memo were disciplined; Anjoum Noorani was suspended and was later given a final warning, exceptionally valid for five years instead of the usual one year, because of the severity of his actions. He was also banned from overseas postings for five years.
