= Marco Ganci =

Italian Catholic priest and diplomat (born 1976)

The Reverend Monsignor Marco Ganci
- Apostolic Nuncio
- Church: Catholic Church
- Predecessor: Paolo Rudelli
- Successor: Paul Butnaru
- Previous post: Permanent Observer to the Council of Europe (2019-2026)

Orders
- Ordination: 16 December 2000 by Antonio Cantisani

Personal details
- Born: 16 May 1976 (age 50) Catanzaro, Calabria, Italy
- Education: Pontifical Lateran University

Marco Ganci (born 16 May 1976) is an Italian clergyman and a diplomat of the Holy See.

== Biography ==
Marco Ganci was born in Catanzaro, Italy, on 16 May 1976. He was ordained a priest of the Archdiocese of Catanzaro-Squillace on 16 December 2000. His brother Andrea is also a priest. He earned his licentiate in theology with a specialization in social morality at the Theological Institute of Calabria "S. Pius X" in Catanzaro in November 2002. From Rome's Pontifical Lateran University he obtained his licentiate canon law in November 2004 and his doctorate in canon law in May 2006, with a dissertation on "The Holy See and human rights conventions".

== Diplomatic career ==
In preparation for a career in the diplomatic service, he completed the course of study at the Pontifical Ecclesiastical Academy in 2002.

He entered the diplomatic service of the Holy See on 1 July 2006 and over the next 13 years fulfilled assignments in the offices representing the Holy See in Bolivia, Greece, at the European Union in Brussels, and Kenya. Pope Benedict XVI named him a Chaplain of His Holiness (Monsignor) on 1 July 2011.

On 21 September 2019, Pope Francis named him Permanent Observer of the Holy See to the Council of Europe in Strasbourg. He attended his first meeting in that role on 13 November. He is also ex officio a member of the governing board of the Council of Europe Development Bank, based in Paris.

In January 2020, he led a three-day conference to mark the 50th anniversary of the Holy See's presence at the Council of Europe, organized by his predecessor Paolo Rudelli.

== See also ==
- List of heads of the diplomatic missions of the Holy See
