= Raffaele Fornari =

Catholic cardinal

His Eminence Raffaele Fornari
- Prefect of the Congregation for Studies
- Church: Roman Catholic Church
- Appointed: 7 June 1851
- Term ended: 15 June 1854
- Predecessor: Carlo Vizzardelli
- Successor: Giovanni Brunelli
- Other post: Cardinal-Priest of Santa Maria sopra Minerva (1851-54)
- Previous posts: Apostolic Internuncio to Belgium (1838-42); Apostolic Nuncio to Belgium (1842); Apostolic Nuncio to France (1842-50); Titular Archbishop of Nicaea (1842-50)

Orders
- Consecration: 3 April 1842 by Engelbert Sterckx
- Created cardinal: 21 December 1846 (in pectore); 30 September 1850 (revealed) by Pope Pius IX
- Rank: Cardinal-Priest

Personal details
- Born: Raffaele Fornari; 23 January 1787 Rome, Papal States
- Died: 15 June 1854 (aged 67) Rome, Papal States
- Buried: Santa Maria sopra Minerva
- Parents: Francesco Fornari; Teresa Galli
- Education: Collegio Romano

Raffaele Fornari (23 January 1787, in Rome, Italy – 15 June 1854, in Rome) was a Cardinal of the Catholic Church. He was a member of the Papal diplomacy and was nuntius to Belgium in 1842, to France 1842–1851, and prefect of the Congregation for Catholic Education 1851–1854.

He was named as a cardinal in pectore in 1846 by Pope Pius IX and the nomination was formally published later in 1850.
