= Aldo Giordano =

Italian prelate (1954–2021)

His Excellency Aldo Giordano
- Apostolic Nuncio to the European Union
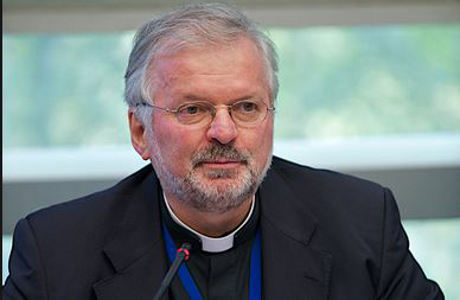
- Giordano in 2013
- Appointed: 8 May 2021
- Term ended: 2 December 2021
- Predecessor: Alain Paul Lebeaupin
- Successor: Noël Treanor
- Other post: Titular archbishop of Tamada
- Previous posts: Permanent Observer of the Holy See to the Council of Europe in Strasbourg (2007–2013); Apostolic Nuncio to Venezuela (2013–2021)

Orders
- Ordination: 28 July 1979
- Consecration: 14 December 2013 by Pietro Parolin

Personal details
- Born: 20 August 1954 Cuneo, Italy
- Died: 2 December 2021 (aged 67) Louvain, Belgium
- Education: Pontifical Gregorian University

Styles of Aldo Giordano
- Reference style: His Excellency; The Most Reverend
- Spoken style: Your Excellency
- Religious style: Archbishop

Aldo Giordano (20 August 1954 – 2 December 2021) was an Italian prelate of the Catholic Church who was Apostolic Nuncio to the European Union in 2021. He was previously Apostolic Nuncio to Venezuela from 2013 to 2021 and before that the Permanent Observer of the Holy See to the Council of Europe in Strasbourg from 2008 to 2013.

From his ordination in 1979 to 1995 he did pastoral work and taught in his native city of Cuneo. He then served as secretary-general of the Council of Episcopal Conferences of Europe, based in Switzerland, for thirteen years.

== Biography ==
Giordano was born in Cuneo, Italy. He attended the last year of elementary school and middle and high school in the Seminary of Cuneo (1965–1973). He completed his studies in philosophy and theology and obtained a bachelor's degree in 1978. He was ordained a priest of the Diocese of Cuneo on 28 July 1979.

From 1978 to 1982, he studied philosophy in Rome at the Pontifical Gregorian University. He was awarded a licentiate in 1980. During this time he was vice pastor of the parish of SS. Sacramento sulla Prenestina.

From 1982 to 1996, Giordano served as professor of philosophy at the Inter-Diocesan School in Fossano (Cuneo). At the diocesan level he taught the history of philosophy in the seminary high school and he has taught courses on ethics in the school of theology for lay people. He worked as a curate in the parish of S. Pius X in Cuneo and followed the diocesan pastoral areas of politics, economics, medicine and culture.

On 15 May 1995, he was elected secretary-general Council of Episcopal Conferences of Europe and was transferred to St. Gallen, Switzerland, where it is headquartered. He served in this role for 13 years. In 2002 he was awarded the title Chaplain of His Holiness and in 2006 Prelate of His Holiness.

On 7 July 2008, Pope Benedict XVI appointed him Permanent Observer of the Holy See to the Council of Europe in Strasbourg.

On 26 October 2013, Pope Francis appointed him Apostolic Nuncio to Venezuela and Titular Archbishop of the Tamada. He succeeded Pietro Parolin who left the nuncio's position to become Secretary of State. Parolin ordained Giordano a bishop at the Sports Palace of San Rocco Castagnaretta in Cuneo on 14 December.

On 8 May 2021, Pope Francis appointed him Apostolic Nuncio to the European Union.

Giordano died from complications of COVID-19 on 2 December 2021, after having spent weeks at a hospital in Louvain.

== Writings ==
- La questione etica. Una sfida della memoria (in Italian). Rome: Città Nuova. 1990. ISBN 8831132423.
- With F. Tomatis. Cristianesimo ed Europa. La sfida della mondialità (in Italian). Rome: Città Nuova. 1993. ISBN 8831132490.
- Un'altra Europa è possibile. Ideali cristiani e prospettive per il vecchio continente (in Italian). Cinisello Balsamo: San Paolo. 2013. ISBN 9788821579844.

Diplomatic posts
Preceded by Vito Rallo	Permanent Observer of the Holy See to the Council of Europe; 7 July 2008 – 26 October 2013	Succeeded by Paolo Rudelli
Preceded by Pietro Parolin	Apostolic Nuncio to Venezuela; 26 October 2013 – 8 May 2021	Succeeded by Alberto Ortega Martín
Preceded by Alain Paul Lebeaupin	Apostolic Nuncio to the European Union; 8 May 2021 – 2 December 2021	Succeeded by Noël Treanor
