= C. W. Stephens =

British architect

- Born: Charles William Stephens c. 1845
- Died: 4 August 1917 (aged 71–72); Kensington, London, England
- Occupation: Architect
- Known for: Designing: Claridge's; Harrods; Harvey Nichols; Park Lane Hotel

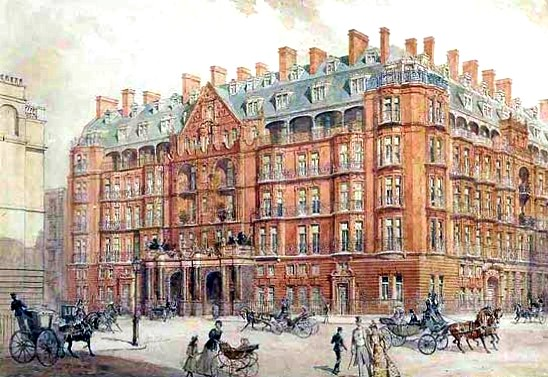
Claridge's Hotel, new building by C. W. Stephens, 1897

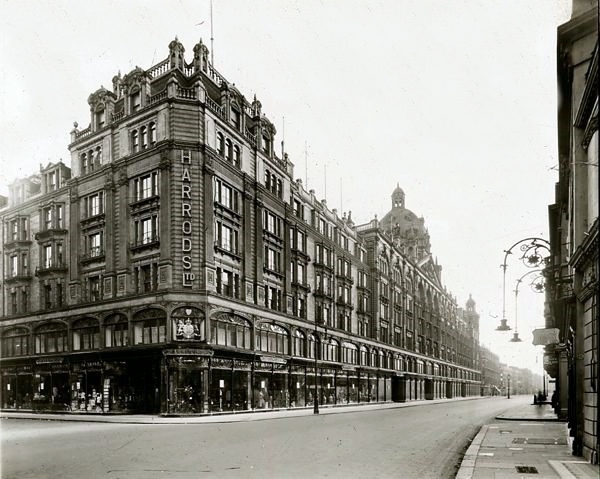
Harrods showing the Brompton Road façade (right) designed by Stephens

Charles William Stephens (c.1845 – 4 August 1917) was a British architect. As architect to the Harrods department store in London from 1892 until his death, he was responsible for the store's famous Baroque-style façade on Brompton Road. His other designs include Harvey Nichols department store, the new Claridge's hotel, 54 Parkside, and the Park Lane Hotel, all in London.

== Early life and family ==
Charles Stephens was born around 1845 in Clapton, Middlesex. He married Helen (née Grundy), who was born in Malvern Wells, Worcestershire.

== Career ==
In 1871, Stephens was working as a clerk. In 1881, he was recorded on the census as a non-practicing architect with the London School Board.

In 1885, Stephens designed a National School in Malvern Wells, now known as the Malvern Wells Church of England Primary School. By the mid 1880s he had an office in Hans Road, Knightsbridge, and was active in redeveloping Hans Place. He designed 67 Pont Street, now grade II listed, in 1887 and other houses in Hans Place.

In 1889 he designed Culgruff House near Crossmichael in Kirkcudbrightshire, Scotland, for Robert Stewart of Southwick. A baronial style mansion in red sandstone of two storeys with attics and tall square tower, it is listed as Category B.

He designed part of Walsingham House. It was demolished in 1904 and replaced by The Ritz Hotel.

By 1894, he was architect to the Belgrave Estate Limited, which had been formed to redevelop the area north of Hans Place. One of the members of that syndicate, Herbert Bennett, was also a director of the Harrods department store, and "no doubt through this connection" Stephens became architect of Harrods from 1892 until his death. He has been described as designing "virtually all of the buildings facing or in the immediate vicinity of Harrods" and was also responsible for the whole of the Baroque-style façade on Brompton Road that was completed in 1905 and which, apart from some changes by Louis D. Blanc and repairs of war damage, survives substantially intact.

In 1894, he designed the Harvey Nichols department store, also in Knightsbridge.

Stephens was responsible for designing the new Claridge's hotel on the corner of Brook Street and Davies Street, between 1894 and 1898. In 1897, he designed 54 Parkside (now the Apostolic Nunciature and formally known as Winkfield Lodge), a large detached house in Wimbledon, London, overlooking Wimbledon Common. It has been listed Grade II on the National Heritage List for England since 1988.

Stephens designed the Park Lane Hotel, but work stopped at the outbreak of the First World War, and was completed by Adie, Button and Partners.

== Later life ==
Stephens died at 49 Hans Road, Kensington, on 4 August 1917, aged 74, and was buried at Putney Vale Cemetery on 8 August. He left an estate of £65,348 and probate was granted to Mary Broughton, spinster, and William Edward Ligonier Balfour, colonel H.M. Army.
