= Efrem Forni =

Italian Cardinal

His Eminence Efrem Forni
- Apostolic Nuncio Emeritus to Luxembourg; Apostolic Nuncio Emeritus to Belgium
- Church: Roman Catholic Church
- Appointed: 9 November 1953
- Term ended: 19 March 1962
- Predecessor: Fernando Cento
- Successor: Silvio Angelo Pio Oddi
- Other post: Cardinal-Priest of Santa Croce in Gerusalemme (1962-76)
- Previous posts: Titular Archbishop of Darnis (1937-62); Apostolic Nuncio to Ecuador (1937-53)

Orders
- Ordination: 6 July 1913
- Consecration: 20 February 1938 by Eugenio Pacelli
- Created cardinal: 19 March 1962 by Pope John XXIII
- Rank: Cardinal-Priest

Personal details
- Born: Efrem Leone Pio Forni; 10 January 1889 Milan, Kingdom of Italy
- Died: 26 February 1976 (aged 87) Agostino Gemelli University Policlinic, Rome, Italy
- Buried: San Francesco, Gallarante, Milan, Italy
- Parents: Enrico Giancarlo Forni; Angela Ambrosoli
- Education: University of Milan; Pontifical Gregorian University; Pontifical Ecclesiastical Academy
- Motto: Ardere et lucere perfectum

Styles of Efrem Forni
- Reference style: His Eminence
- Spoken style: Your Eminence
- Informal style: Cardinal
- See: none

Efrem Leone Pio Forni (10 January 1889 – 26 February 1976) was an Italian Cardinal of the Roman Catholic Church. He served as Nuncio to Belgium and Internuncio to Luxembourg from 1953 to 1962, and was elevated to the Cardinalate in 1962.

== Biography ==
Born in Milan, he is the second son of Don Enrico Giancarlo Forni and Donna Angela Ambrosoli. Efrem studied at the University of Milan, and the Pontifical Gregorian University, as well as the Pontifical Ecclesiastical Academy in Rome. He was ordained to the priesthood on 6 July 1913, and then taught at the archiepiscopal college of Cantù and at the college of d'Arona until 1921. Msgr. Forni was secretary (1921-1926) and later auditor (1926-1928) of the Portuguese nunciature. In the French nunciature, he was auditor (1928) and counselor (1937). He was raised to the rank of Honorary Chamberlain on 18 October 1921, Privy Chamberlain on 20 June 1923, and finally Domestic Prelate on 20 June 1937.

On 27 November 1937, Msgr. Forni was appointed Nuncio to Ecuador and Titular Archbishop of Darnis. He received his episcopal consecration on 20 February 1938 from Cardinal Eugenio Pacelli, (elected Pope in 1939) with Archbishops Alberto Levame and Luigi Traglia serving as co-consecrators, in the church of San Carlo al Corso in Rome. After serving as papal legate to the 1949 National Eucharistic Congress and Nuncio in Ecuador from 1938 till 1953, Forni was named Nuncio to Belgium and Internuncio to Luxembourg on 9 November 1953. On 8 July 1956, he again served as a papal legate, this time to bestow the Golden Rose on the Grand Duchess of Luxembourg. He was "Bali' Cavaliere di Gran Croce d'Onore e Devozione" of the Sovereign Military Order of Malta, of the Order of the Holy Sepulchre of Jerusalem and of many other Orders of Chivalry.

In 1962, Pope John XXIII created him Cardinal Priest of Santa Croce in Gerusalemme, and he resigned his diplomatic posts. From 1962 to 1965, Efrem Cardinal Forni attended the Second Vatican Council, during the course of which he participated in the 1963 papal conclave that selected Pope Paul VI.

Cardinal Efrem Leone Pio Forni died in Rome, at age 87. He is buried in the church of St. Francis Church in Gallarate (near Milan), in the left side of the high Altar, and not in his old family grave in Milan.

Catholic Church titles
Preceded by Angelo Dolci	Nuncio to Ecuador; 1937–1953	Succeeded by Opilio Rossi
Preceded by Fernando Cento	Nuncio to Belgium; 1953–1962	Succeeded by Silvio Oddi
Preceded by Fernando Cento	Internuncio to Luxembourg; 1953–1962	Succeeded by Silvio Oddi
