= Cofton Park =

Park in Birmingham, England

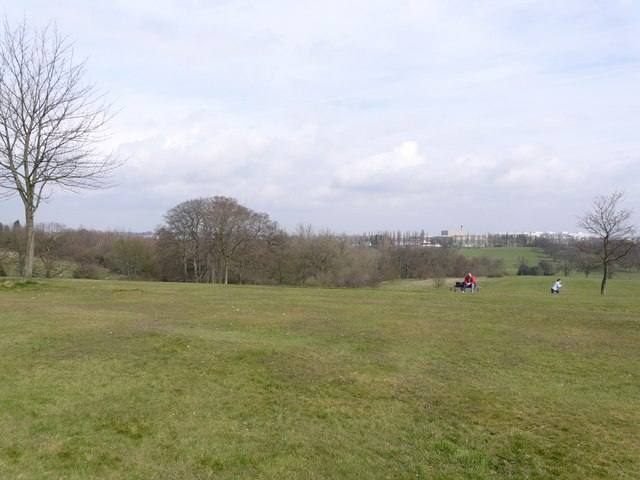
- Interactive map of Cofton Park
- Location: Birmingham, England
- Coordinates: 52°23′05″N 1°59′47″W
- Created: 1933
- Operator: Birmingham City Council
- Website: www.birmingham.gov.uk/coftonpark

Cofton Park (grid reference SP003762) is a park located in south Birmingham, England.

== History ==
The 135 acres of land was acquired by Birmingham City Council in 1933 for £10,640 (equivalent to £658,389 in 2025), from the trustees for William Walter Hinde. In his will, he bequeathed the residue of his estate "for the purchase of land ... to be kept for ever as an open space for the benefit of the people of Birmingham".

It is home to Birmingham City Council's Cofton Nursery which provides displays of bedding plants for parks throughout the city.

The park is also used for civic occasions, the city centre floral display, and Heart of England in Bloom and gardening shows such the Chelsea Flower Show and since 1996, BBC Gardeners' World Live.

== Pope Benedict XVI ==
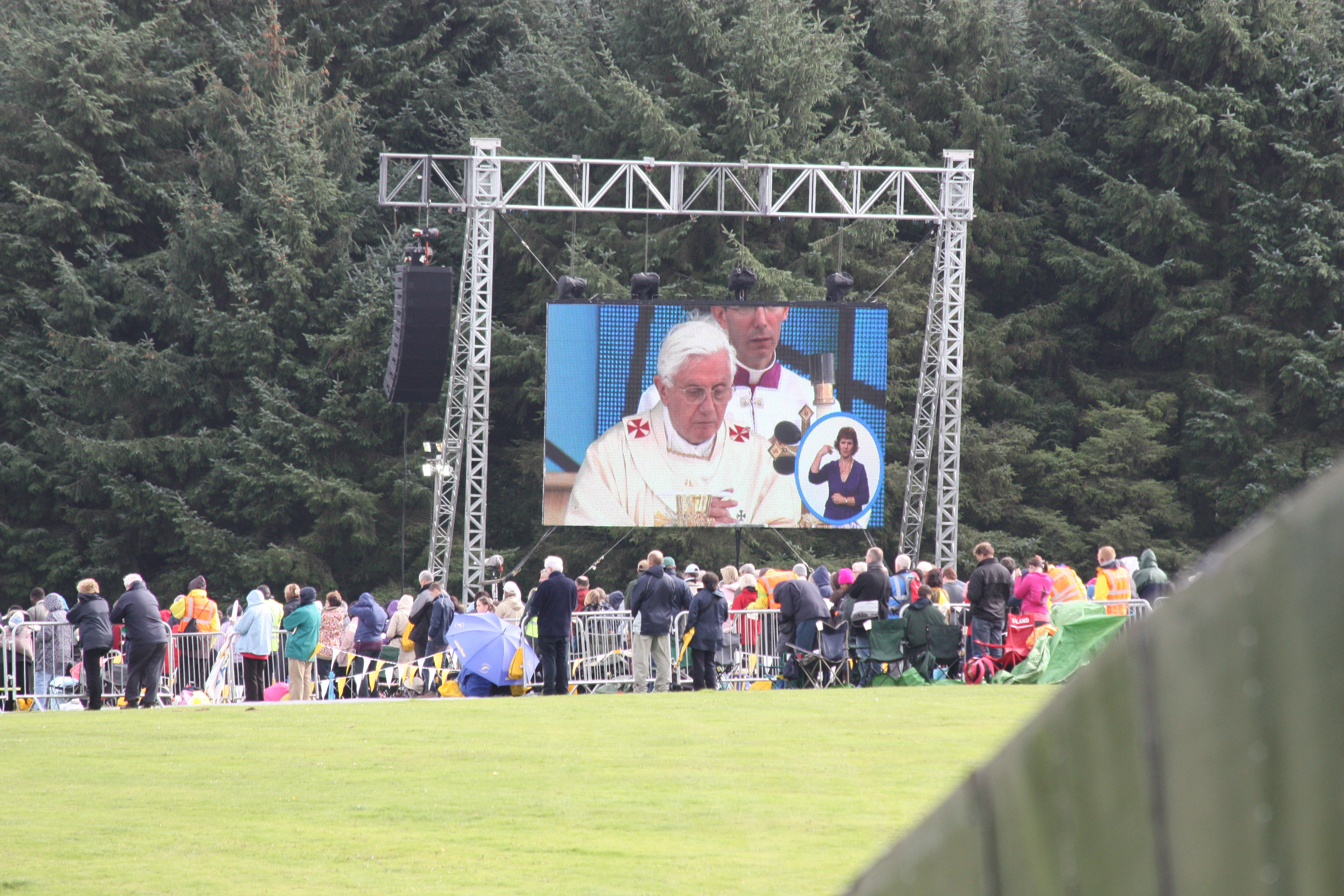
Large display screen showing Pope Benedict XVI

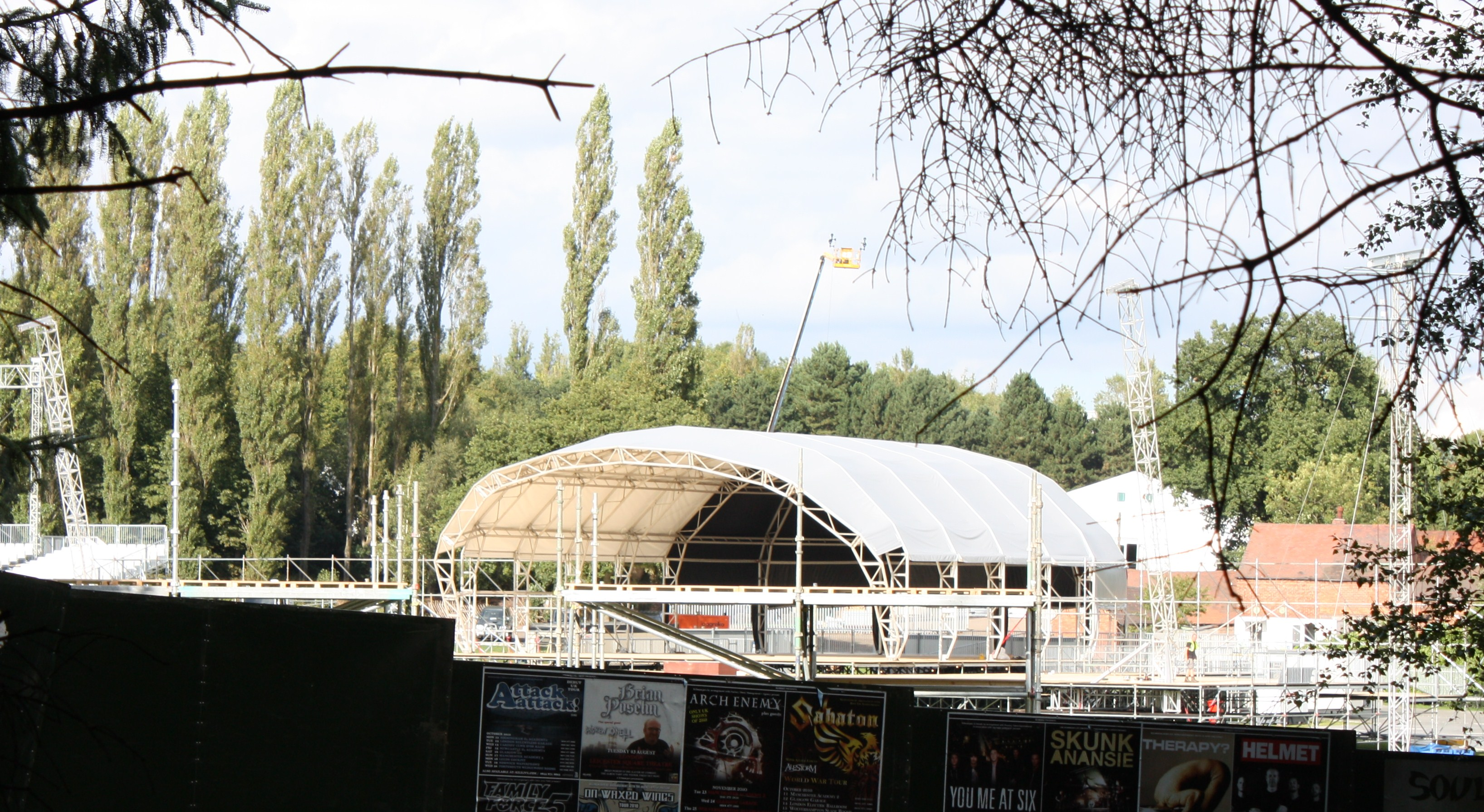
Stage being prepared for ceremony in Cofton Park

During his visit to the United Kingdom, Pope Benedict XVI celebrated mass and presided over the beatification of Cardinal John Henry Newman, with a crowd of 51,626 people present at the 80,000-capacity Cofton Park near Longbridge, Birmingham, on Sunday 19 September 2010.

Prior to the mass, music and prayer ceremonies were held at the park and were broadcast live on BBC Radio 4 as part of their weekly programme Sunday Worship. At the end of the mass, once Pope Benedict XVI had left the park to continue on to other engagements, students from Saint Augustine's High School in Redditch performed numerous soul-inspired songs for the crowd.
