= 54 Parkside =

House in Wimbledon, London

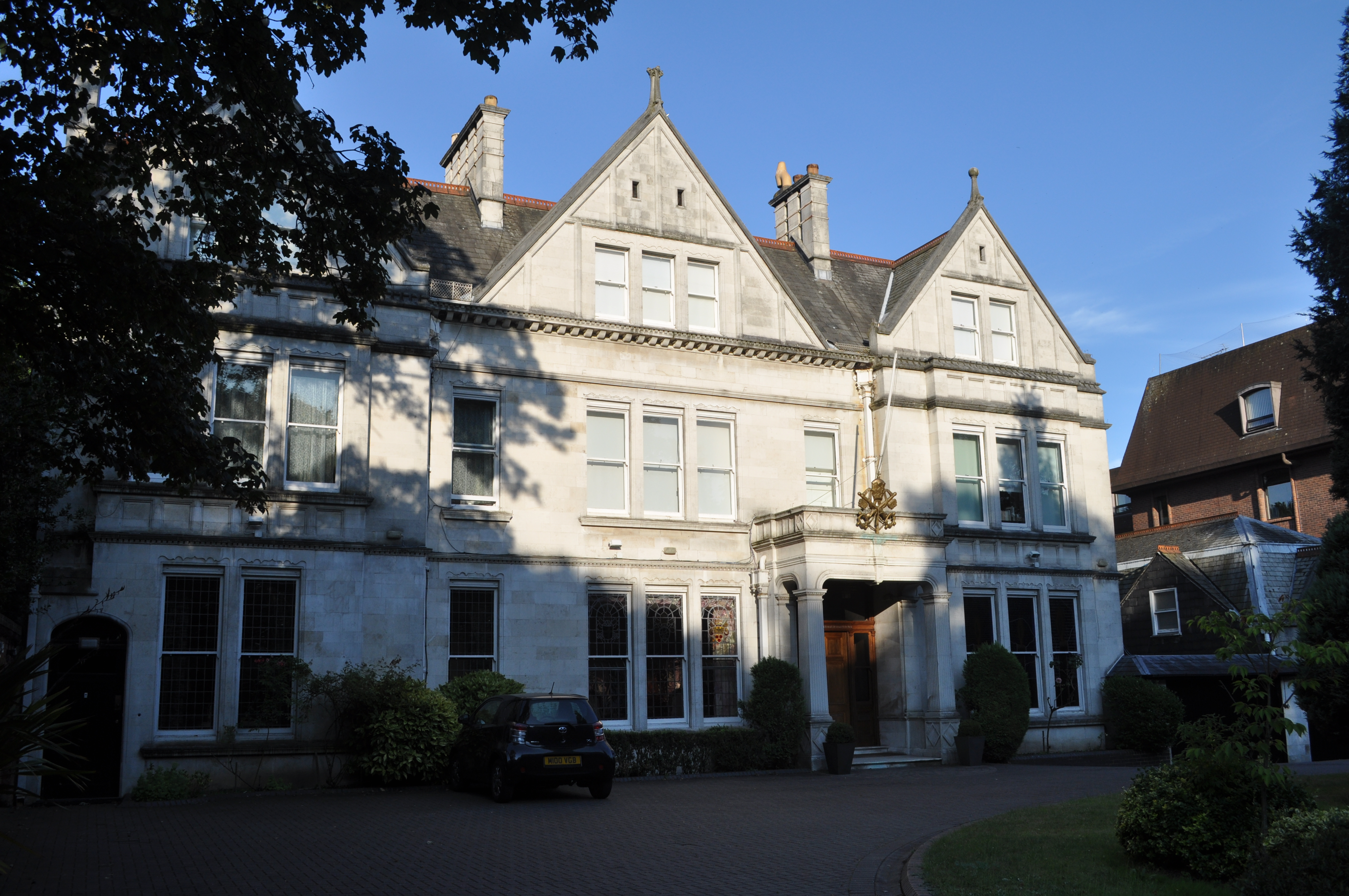
- Interactive map of 54 Parkside
- 51.4361°N 0.2239°W
- Type: House
- Location: Wimbledon, London Borough of Merton

History
- Built: 1898

Site notes
- Architect: C. W. Stephens
- Governing body: Catholic Church of England and Wales

Listed Building – Grade II
- Official name: Apostolic Nunciature
- Designated: 2 September 1988
- Reference no.: 1080911

54 Parkside (presently the Apostolic Nunciature to the United Kingdom) is a large, detached house in Wimbledon, London, SW19, overlooking Wimbledon Common. First known as Winkfield Lodge, the property is the current diplomatic office of the Holy See in Great Britain. Designed c. 1897 by architect C. W. Stephens, as a private home, 54 Parkside has been Grade II listed on the National Heritage List for England since September 1988.

== Architecture ==
The house is two storeys in height, built from Portland stone and has a steeply pitched green slate roof with tall chimneys. Divided into 11 bays, the entrance to the house is in the fourth bay, under a projecting porch. The bay windows to either side of the porch, are glazed with stained glass; one with traditional leaded lights. The three windows of the bay to the south contain a stained glass artwork commissioned for the 2010 Visit of Pope Benedict XVI to the United Kingdom, commemorating the beatification of John Henry Cardinal Newman, designed by artist Brian Clarke for the new Papal Chapel.

== History ==
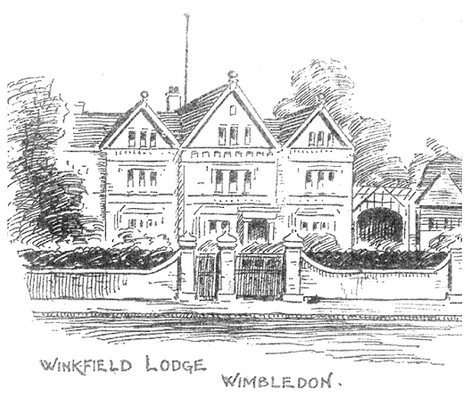
Winkfield Lodge

In 1896, the house had six bedrooms and a ha-ha divided the house from its neighbour, Wressil Lodge. The house was owned by Charles Anthony Mills in 1896; Mills named the house Winkfield Lodge after winning £20,000 on a horse named Winkfield's Pride that had been a 200-to-1 gamble at a race at Newmarket. Prior to Mills's renaming, it had been known as Tudor House. The Wimbledon Borough News described Mills, in 1908, as 'the great turf man who lives in splendid style in Parkside'.

In 1914, Winkfield Lodge was sold to Arthur Warwick Sutton JP (1854-1925). Sutton was senior partner in his family's seed business, Suttons Seeds (formerly Sutton & Sons), which had been founded in 1806 in Reading, Berks by his grandfather, John Sutton (1777-1863). Arthur's father, Martin Hope Sutton (1815-1901), joined the firm in 1837 and Suttons became a huge international business, receiving a Royal Warrant in 1858. It played a crucial role in the country's vegetable production during World War One, though the effects of the War on the business were devastating: Arthur's brother, Leonard Goodhart Sutton (1863-1932), who like his father served as Mayor of Reading, lost four of his five sons in the conflict. Suttons Seeds is still in business though it is now based in Paignton and no longer in the ownership of the Sutton family. Arthur was a Fellow and Councillor of the Linnean Society of London and received the Victoria Medal of Honour from the Royal Horticultural Society, of which he was also a Council member. He was appointed a member of the Appeal Tribunal (a special court set up to reconsider a decision by another court) for the County of Berkshire in 1916. One of his friends was William Bateson (1861-1926), an advocate of the ideas of Gregor Mendel who introduced the term ‘genetics’ to describe the study of heredity and whose 1894 book Materials for the Study of Variation was one of the earliest formulations of the new approach to genetics. Sutton provided the means for Bateson to carry out extensive studies into genetics using the species Primula sinensis.

Arthur Sutton later moved to Bournemouth where he was tangentially involved in a notorious murder. His chauffeur, Thomas Henry Alloway, had lured Irene Williams to Bournemouth, where he murdered her. The police obtained the telegram he sent to Miss Williams, but Alloway had destroyed all copies of his handwriting before the crime (or so he thought) and had changed his script. An impressive detective operation had persuaded the police that he was the culprit; without handwriting evidence, they could not make a case. The crucial break came when Alloway, short of funds, forged £96 worth of cheques from his employer – signing them “Arther Sutton” was a bit of a giveaway. This crime gave police permission to enter Alloway's home, where they found several letters in Alloway's hand going back some years. This was enough to convict him and he was hanged in August 1922.

Sutton leased the house to Captain Edward Kendrick Bunbury-Tighe and his family in 1917. Tighe was a wealthy Irish landowner and British Army officer who had served in the Anglo-Burmese Wars. On 13 November, Tighe was found by his wife with severe head wounds in his bedroom at the lodge. A bloodied poker was found nearby, and some small objects had been stolen, including a pocket watch. Tighe died a few days later on 17 November, having never regained consciousness; his body was identified by Francis Younghusband. A burglar, Arthur Henry de Stamir, was later found with Tighe's possessions at his lodgings. Stamir was found guilty of Tighe's murder and was hanged at Wandsworth Prison on 18 February 1918.

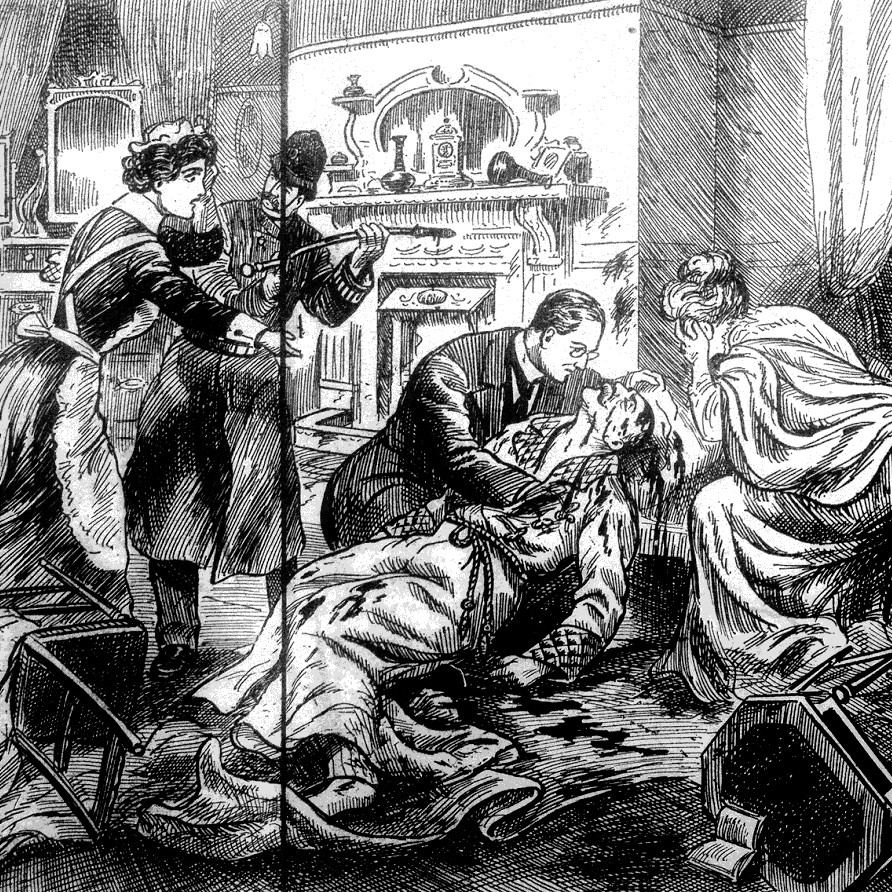
Captain Tighe's bloodied body found, as imagined by The Illustrated Police News, 22 November 1917.

Following Tighe's death, the house was owned by the British businessman and politician Joseph Hood. Hood served as the member of parliament for Wimbledon from 1918 to 1924 and as Mayor of Wimbledon from 1930 until his death in 1931.

== Apostolic Nunciature ==
The house has been the site of the Apostolic Nunciature to Great Britain, and home of the Apostolic Nuncio, the diplomatic representative of the Vatican City to Great Britain, since 1938. It was historically the only diplomatic residence south of the River Thames. Pope John Paul II stayed once at the house, and Pope Benedict XVI stayed at the house from 17 to 19 September 2010 during his visit to the United Kingdom.

=== Papal chapel ===
Pope Benedict celebrated Mass in the Apostolic Nunciature's chapel on the morning of 17 September, the second day of the 2010 visit, and blessed the newly installed stained glass windows designed by the artist Brian Clarke for the Papal Chapel. The works of art were commissioned to commemorate the Beatification of Cardinal John Henry Newman. Benedict also privately met five victims of Catholic clerical sexual abuse during his stay at the house.
