= State visit by Pope Benedict XVI to the United Kingdom =

Pastoral visit

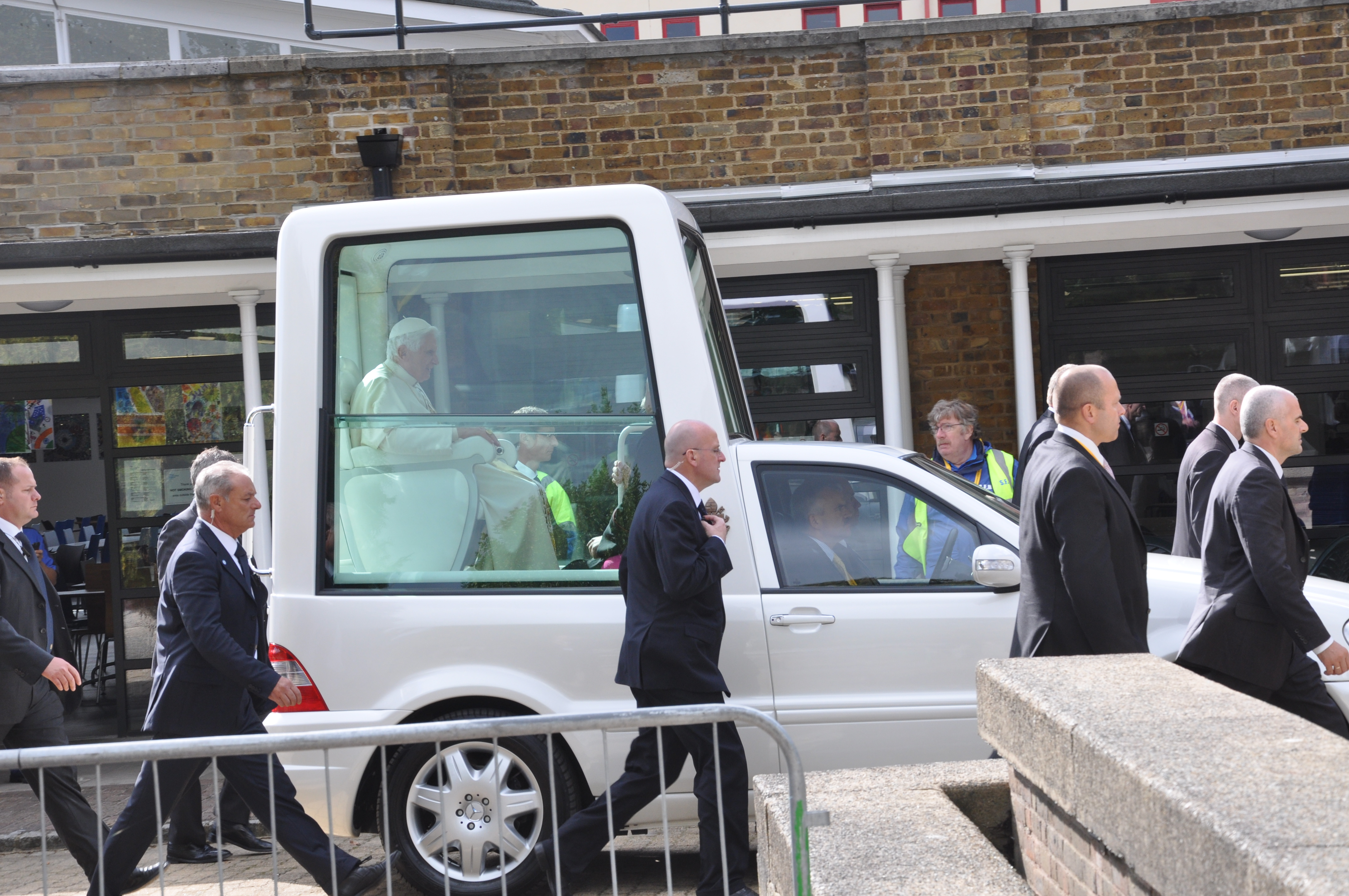
The papal visit in Westminster, London

The state visit of Pope Benedict XVI to the United Kingdom was held from 16 to 19 September 2010 and was the first visit by a pope to Britain after Pope John Paul II made a pastoral, rather than state, visit in 1982. The visit included the beatification of Cardinal Newman as a "pastoral highlight".

Pope Benedict's visit included meetings with Elizabeth II (Queen of the United Kingdom and Supreme Governor of the Church of England), Prime Minister David Cameron, Archbishop of Canterbury Rowan Williams, First Minister of Scotland Alex Salmond, and leaders of the other main political parties.

The Pope's itinerary included open air Masses in Glasgow and Birmingham, a youth vigil in Hyde Park in London, and Mass at Westminster Cathedral in London, attended by over 200,000 people.

== Invitation and planning ==
An invitation to visit Britain was extended to Pope Benedict XVI by then Prime Minister Gordon Brown in February 2009. The Pope's visit featured in the debates between party leaders in April 2010, prior to the 2010 United Kingdom general election, where all three party leaders expressed support for the visit, while expressing disagreement with some of the Pope's views.

Anjoum Noorani of the Foreign and Commonwealth Office was originally a key contact between the British Government and the papal visit team. However, he was suspended from overseas postings and given a final warning, to last for five years, after approving the sending of a memo written by Steven Mulvain, a 23-year-old Oxford graduate, mocking the visit. Subsequently, the new Government appointed liberal Catholic Lord Patten to get the visit back on track following a series of setbacks.

=== Ticketed events ===
There were three specific ticketed events open to the public during the Pope's visit. These were a Mass in Bellahouston Park, Glasgow, on the afternoon of Thursday 16 September, an evening prayer vigil in Hyde Park, London, on Saturday 18 September, and the Mass of Beatification of John Henry Newman in Cofton Park, Longbridge, Birmingham, on Sunday 19 September.

In contrast with the previous Papal visit to Britain, that of Pope John Paul II in 1982, where anyone could attend open-air events, there was tight security for the 2010 Papal visit, with all attendees required to register in advance through their parish and to attend in a group with a 'Pilgrim Leader' from that parish, who as leader had the responsibility to vouch for all members of his group. All registered attendees received a 'Pilgrim Pass', required for admission to events. Non-Catholics were permitted to attend, by contacting their local parish.

The Mass of Beatification in Cofton Park was originally arranged for Coventry Airport, with a capacity of up to 250,000. The planned event at the airport, which had seen 350,000 attend the visit of Pope John Paul II in 1982, was the subject of an Isle of Man commemorative stamp. However the event was switched to the much smaller Cofton Park, Longbridge, a switch that the church denied was to reduce costs, instead stating that Cofton Park had a greater connection to Newman, who had lived in the area and walked around the park.

=== Costs ===
The visit of the Pope was the first state visit of a Pope to Britain; the visit of his predecessor, Pope John Paul II, had been a pastoral visit, and as such the British government did not pay the costs of that visit, although expenses were incurred by local governments in areas that he visited.

The final cost to the British taxpayer (excluding policing costs) of the visit was £10 million. The cost to the taxpayer was criticised, with a ComRes poll showing that 76% of people in the UK agreed with the statement that 'The Pope is a religious figure so the taxpayer should not be contributing to the costs of his visit'. The cost was defended by the Archbishop of Westminster, leader of the Catholic Church in England and Wales, who said that it was right for the government to pay for official State Visits, as well as by Lord Patten, who said that the cost compared favourably with the £20 million spent on the 2009 G-20 London Summit. The visit was predicted to cost Edinburgh City council £400,000.

The financial benefits as well as costs of the Papal visit were reported, with the councillor coordinating the visit to Birmingham, which incurred £80,000 in direct costs, estimated before the event a £12.5 million boost to the city, while Scott Taylor of Glasgow City Marketing Bureau said that there was a direct £4.25m benefit to Glasgow, with further valuable publicity from the resultant media coverage of the city.

It was announced in July that attendees at events would be charged for a compulsory 'Pilgrim Pack', including commemorative items, in order to fund transport costs. The costs were £5 for the Hyde Park vigil (which did not include transport), £25 to attend the Cofton Park event and £20 to attend Bellahouston Park Mass. The £20 charge for Bellahouston Park was levied on the parish, which had discretion as to whether it recouped the cost directly from attendees. The charges were said to be the first ever levied for attending Papal events, and came amid reports that the church was £2.6 million short of its donation target.

The cost to the Catholic Church was £10 million, against the £7 million published on the Papal Visit website. The bulk of the £7m, £5.2m was for staging the three large-scale public events, a further £0.6m for three smaller pastoral events, with the remaining £1.2m covering evangelism, planning and communication. £1.1 million was raised through a Pentecost Sunday special collection in churches and £4m from wealthy individual donors. As of November 2010 the church had a £3.5m shortfall, due to be repaid to the Government by April 2011.

== Visit ==
=== Scotland ===
==== 16 September ====
Pope Benedict XVI began his official visit in Scotland at Edinburgh Airport on 16 September, where he was greeted by Prince Philip and the Archbishops of Westminster and St Andrews and Edinburgh. He then met the Queen for the first time at Holyrood Palace in Edinburgh, the Queen's official residence in Scotland, with the ceremonial Guard of honour formed by the Royal Regiment of Scotland, the Royal Company of Archers and the High Constables of Holyroodhouse.

In his speech at Holyrood Palace, the Pope associated atheist extremism with Nazism, causing controversy. The Pope said:

Even in our own lifetime, we can recall how Britain and her leaders stood against a Nazi tyranny that wished to eradicate God from society and denied our common humanity to many, especially the Jews, who were thought unfit to live. I also recall the regime’s attitude to Christian pastors and religious who spoke the truth in love, opposed the Nazis and paid for that opposition with their lives. As we reflect on the sobering lessons of the atheist extremism of the twentieth century, let us never forget how the exclusion of God, religion and virtue from public life leads ultimately to a truncated vision of man and of society and thus to a “reductive vision of the person and his destiny”.

A parade for Saint Ninian's day was held at 11am, the route beginning on Regent Road, Edinburgh, and proceeding along Princes Street. Attendance was open to all, with a parade of school children and figures from Scotland's Christian history, in honour of St Ninian of Galloway, who brought Christianity to Scotland from Rome in the fifth century. After the parade, which was attended by around 125,000 people, the Pope proceeded by Popemobile to have lunch with Cardinal O'Brien at his home before travelling by car to Glasgow.

The Pope was greeted by the Archbishop of Glasgow for the ticketed Mass of the Feast of St Ninian in Bellahouston Park. Susan Boyle and Pop Idol winner Michelle McManus performed before the start of the Mass. Attendance was around 65,000 people. The Pope flew from Glasgow Airport to London Heathrow airport that evening.

=== England ===
==== 17 September ====
On the second day of his visit to the United Kingdom the Pope began the day with a private Mass at 54 Parkside, Wimbledon, the official residence of the Apostolic Nunciature to Great Britain, blessing three stained glass windows commissioned from the artist Brian Clarke for the new Papal Chapel. The works of art were to commemorate the Beatification of Cardinal John Henry Newman. His first public engagement was a celebration of Catholic education with a visit to address educators and students at St Mary's University, Twickenham, which was followed by a meeting with people of faith in the university's Waldegrave Drawing Room.

He became the first Pope to enter Lambeth Palace, where he met the Archbishop of Canterbury. He made the journey from Lambeth Palace to the Palace of Westminster by Popemobile, making an address to Civil Society from the spot in Westminster Hall where St Thomas More was sentenced to a martyr's death in 1535, being accused of high treason for holding to his Catholic faith in refusing to acknowledge the validity of the Act of Succession.

In the evening there was an ecumenical celebration of evening prayer at Westminster Abbey with representatives from all the main Christian churches including the Greek Orthodox, Coptic and Free Churches. He later venerated the tomb of Edward the Confessor at the Abbey.

==== 18 September ====
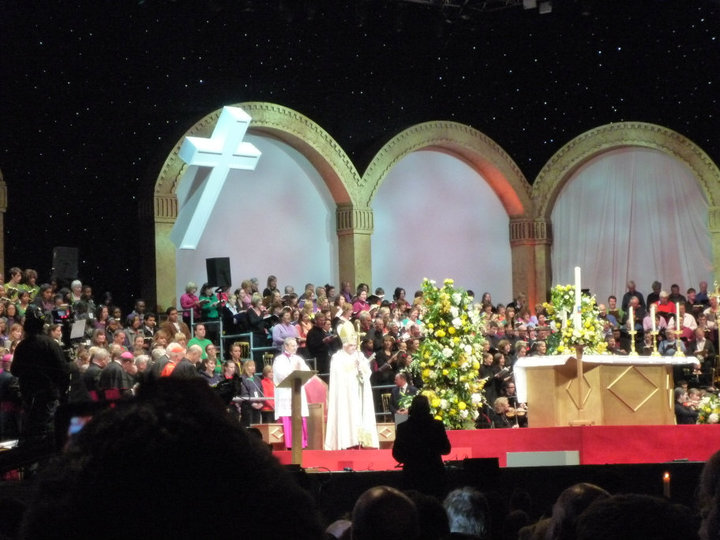
Pope Benedict leads the vigil in Hyde Park.

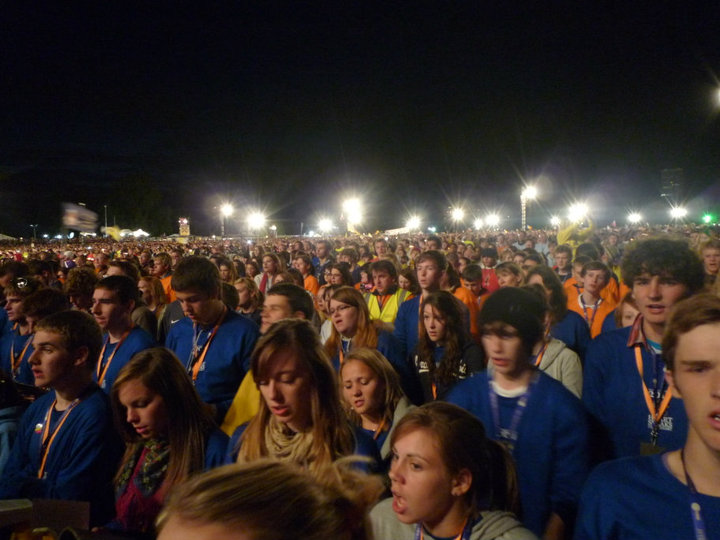
Some of the 80,000 attending the vigil in Hyde Park.

The Pope began the day with meetings with David Cameron, Prime Minister, Nick Clegg, Deputy Prime Minister, and Harriet Harman, Acting Leader of the Opposition. This was followed with morning Mass in Westminster Cathedral. In his sermon, the Pope referenced sexual abuse by priests, saying: "Here, too, I think of the immense suffering caused by the abuse of children, especially within the church and by her ministers. Above all, I express my deep sorrow to the innocent victims of these unspeakable crimes", saying "I also acknowledge with you the shame and humiliation which all of us have suffered because of these sins".

After Mass, the Pope used the middle part of the day to meet five victims of child sex abuse at the Apostolic Nunciature, apologising to them and describing the Church's measures to protect young people. The meeting had been planned before the Pope's visit, and time was left free in his schedule to allow for it.

In the evening the Pope visited St Peter's Residence for Older People, run by Little Sisters of the Poor. The Pope travelled to the day's main event, the ticketed Hyde Park Prayer Vigil on the Eve of the Beatification of Cardinal Newman, by Popemobile. The vigil was attended by 80,000 people. The Pope's speech described Newman's life's work "as a struggle against the growing tendency to view religion as a purely private and subjective matter, a question of personal opinion", stating that it was a lesson for today, in which "an intellectual and moral relativism threatens to sap the very foundations of our society".

==== 19 September ====
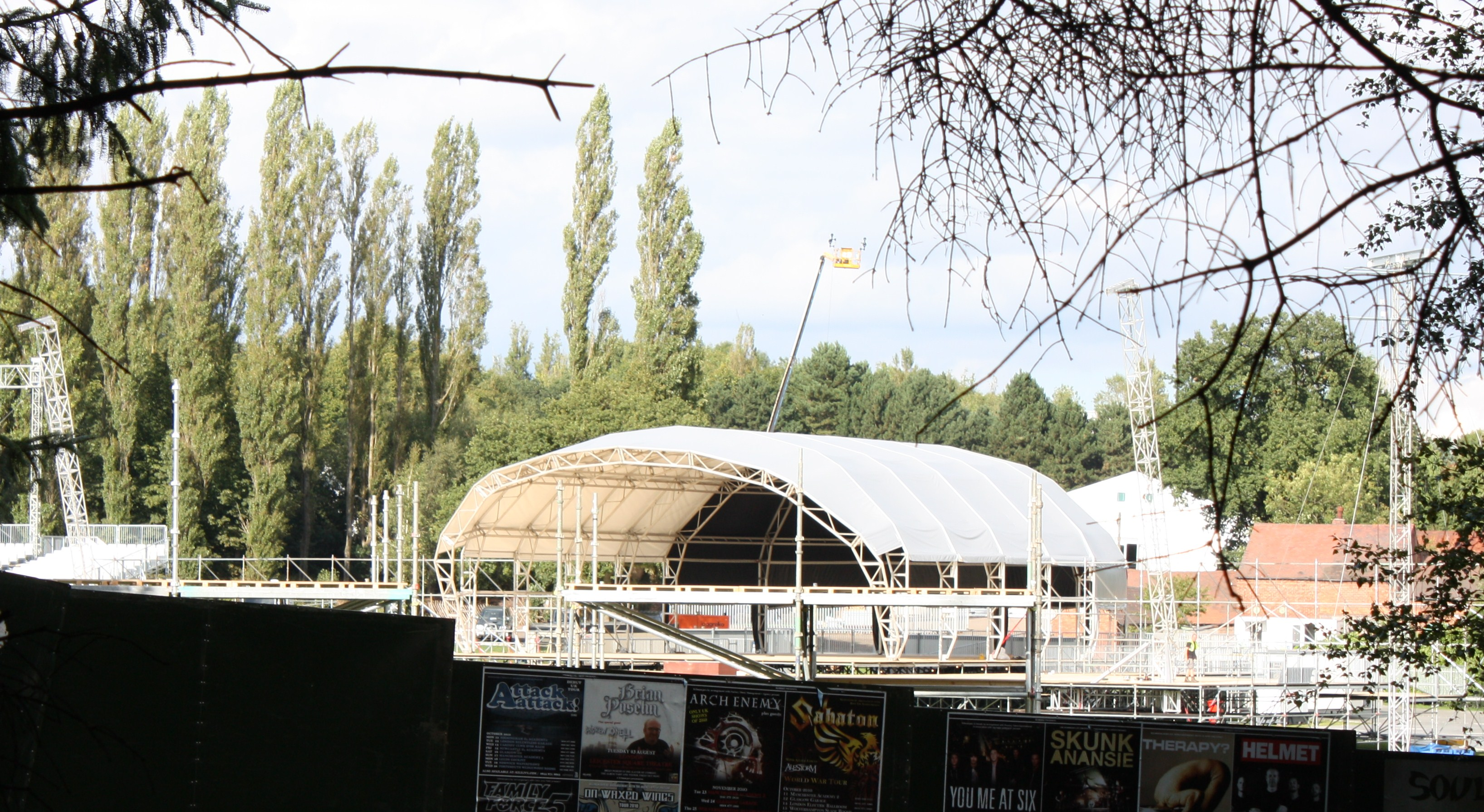
Stage being prepared for ceremony in Cofton Park

The final day of the Pope's visit saw the Pope fly by helicopter from London to Birmingham for the main event of his visit, the beatification of Cardinal John Henry Newman in Cofton Park in Birmingham. Local residents were required to carry vehicle passes as well as to carry proof of identity in order to leave their own homes. Attendance at the event was approximately 55,000, a figure said to have been reduced by the requirement to arrive at the location between 3am and 7am on special coaches for the 10am start.

The Cofton Park Mass was followed by a private visit to Birmingham Oratory, founded by John Henry Newman. The visit was preceded by controversy due to the exiling of three priests to monasteries in separate parts of the world.

The visit concluded with lunch and a meeting with the bishops of England, Scotland and Wales at St Mary's College, Oscott. The pope gave a final speech at Birmingham Airport, before departing for Rome on a chartered Alitalia Airbus A320. British Airways, as UK flag carrier, would have been the usual choice for a state Papal visit, but they were reportedly rejected due to concerns about strikes.

=== Other events ===
The Pope's schedule reportedly included free time to allow for the 83-year-old to take naps.

In conjunction with the visit, an exhibition of Raphael's tapestries for the Sistine Chapel took place at London's Victoria and Albert Museum from 8 September to 17 October 2010 where they were displayed for the first time alongside the Raphael Cartoons used to make them; the cartoons having been in the British Royal Collection since 1623. This followed a reported scaling-back of earlier plans for a large exhibition of Vatican artworks at London's Royal Academy.

== Anti-terrorism arrests ==
On 17 September 2010 the Metropolitan Police arrested five street cleaners under the Terrorism Act 2000 in a pre-dawn raid at a London cleaning depot, in a suspected terrorist plot against the Pope on the second day of his state visit; a sixth person was arrested later in the day at his home "on suspicion of the commission, preparation or instigation of acts of terrorism". The men, aged between 26 and 50, had been working as street cleaners for contractors Veolia Environnement, on behalf of Westminster City Council, and were based at the Chiltern Street depot in Marylebone.

The suspects were questioned at an unidentified London police station. The police did not uncover any hazardous items during an initial search of the business premises and other properties. According to police some of the suspects were thought to be immigrants to Britain, from a variety of nations including a number from Algeria.

All the men were released without charge before the Pope's visit ended. It turned out they were arrested after joking about how the Popemobile could not withstand an RPG attack.

== Response ==
=== Support ===
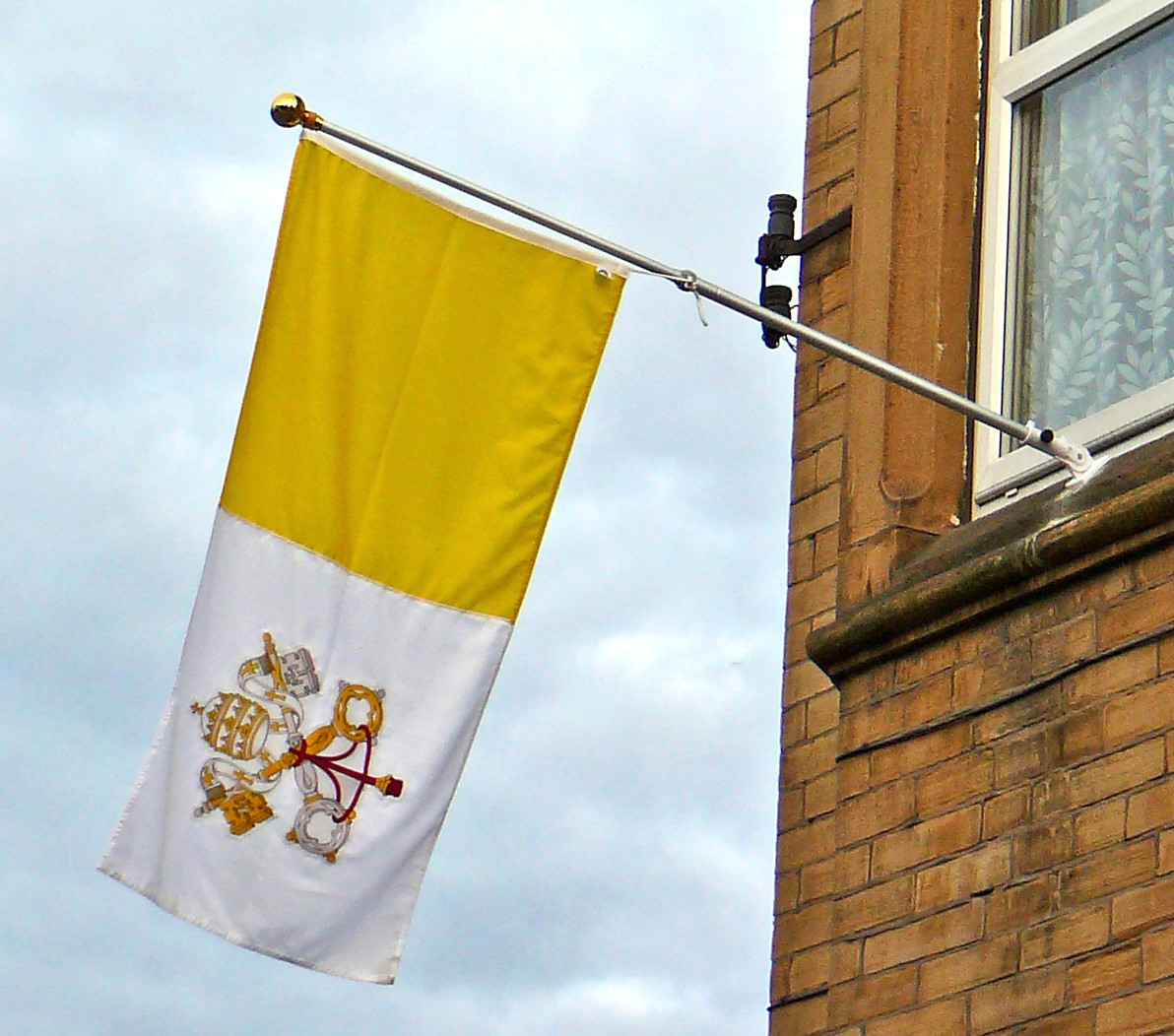
The Flag of Vatican City flying in Bradford, West Yorkshire in honour of the papal visit.

The visit saw support from a range of people and organisations, including several leaders within other religions. The President of the Ahmadiyya Muslim Community UK, Rafiq Hayat, stated that "Religious leaders have a pivotal role to play in promoting peace and serving humanity. Indeed religions have far more commonalities than differences and we welcome moves that will help forge unity and foster greater understanding."

Vivian Wineman, President of the Board of Deputies of British Jews, said: "In an age where scepticism and ill-will towards religion is rising, it will be an excellent opportunity to demonstrate that there is much to unite people of faith and much that can be achieved when we work together for the greater good not only of our members, but for society as a whole."

Media coverage of the visit, which was largely critical before the event, was more positive during and following the Pope's visit. A BBC News correspondent noted that 'there was a tangible sense of relief, even of euphoria, among Pope Benedict's entourage during the return flight to Rome from Birmingham'.

=== Opposition ===
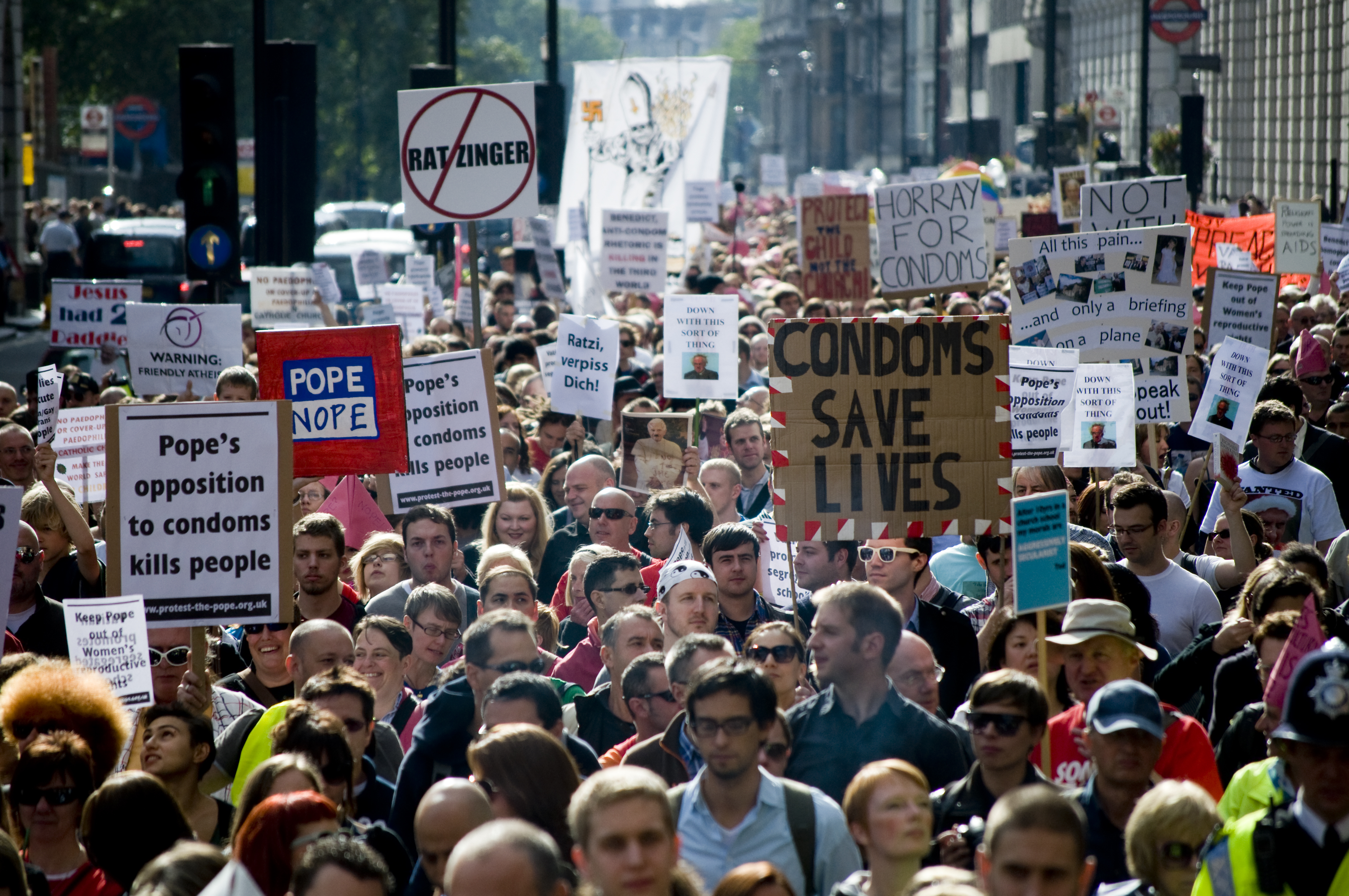
Protest during the Pope's visit

The visit was opposed by a range of people and organisations including some Protestants, LGBT, and secular groups due to a number of reasons, such as the Church's policies on the ordination of women, homosexuality, contraception and AIDS, as well as complaints over historical sexual abuse of children by Catholic priests. Former DUP leader Ian Paisley (known for his staunch Anti-Catholicism in Northern Ireland) called the visit a "mistake" and the principal of Scotland's Free Church Training College said the visit airbrushed the Protestant Reformation out of history and dishonoured reformer and nationalist John Knox. On the eve of the visit, a letter by 50 public figures argued that the Pope's tour should not have been accorded the status of a state visit.

A number of groups, including the British Humanist Association and the National Secular Society organised a campaign of protests against the visit. The Roman Catholic pressure group "Catholic Women's Ordination" arranged for London buses to carry advertisements encouraging the Pope to "Ordain Women Now" and also planned further unspecified lobbying action. Religious and secular correspondents noted that only 3 women appeared at Lambeth Palace to support the ordination of women.

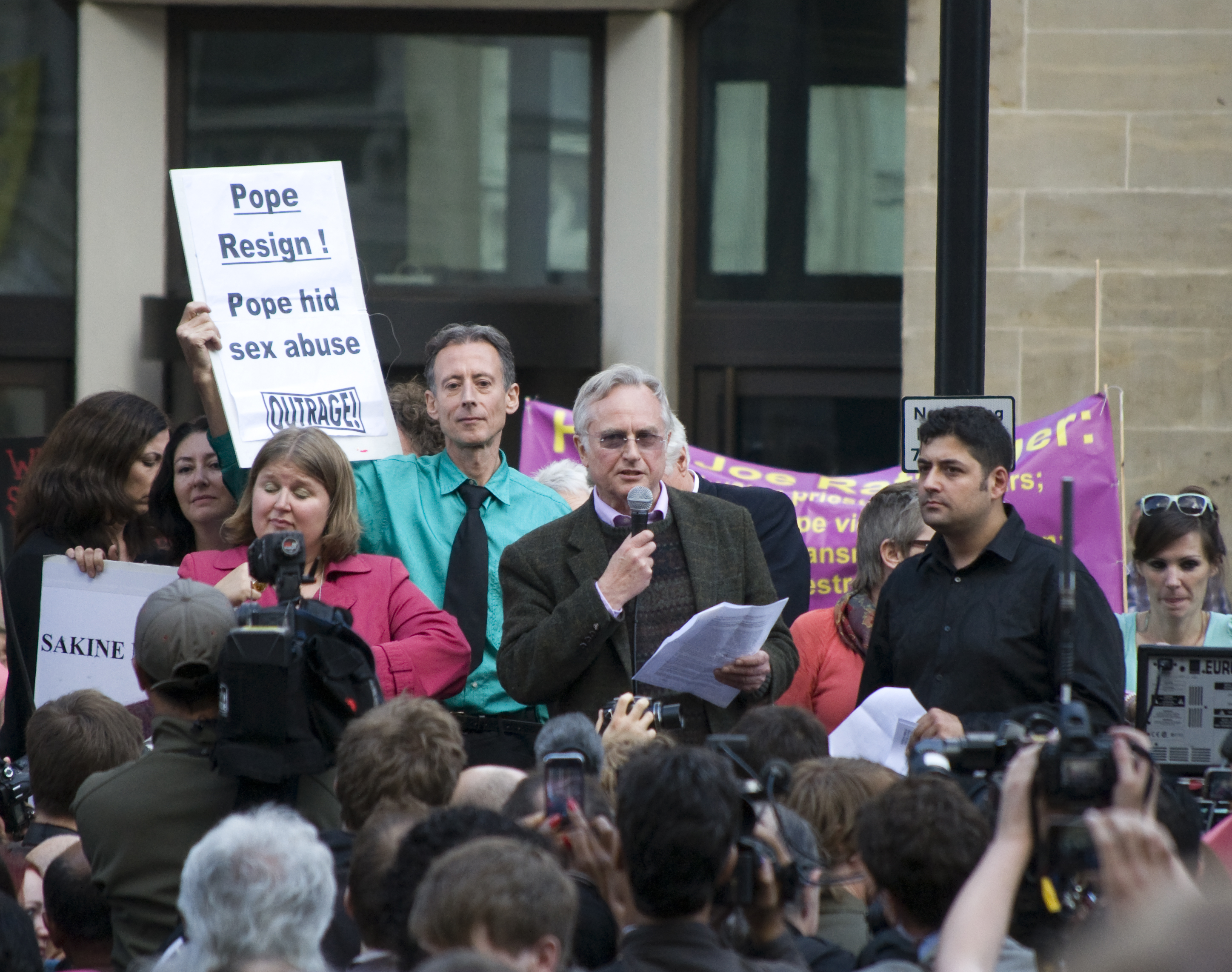
Richard Dawkins speaking at the protest, with Peter Tatchell on the left at the back.

Richard Dawkins gave a speech to over 10,000 people at the "Protest the Pope" rally, declaring the pope "an enemy of humanity", and countering the Pope's claim that the Holocaust was the result of atheism by arguing that Hitler was a Roman Catholic. Dawkins had previously supported a call for the Pope's arrest for "crimes against humanity", an idea first proposed by Christopher Hitchens and described by a former editor of the Catholic Herald as "lunatic", and human rights lawyer Geoffrey Robertson was reported to have looked at options to charge the Pope over his alleged cover-up of sexual abuse in the Catholic Church.

In July 2010, the UK government announced plans to change the law on universal jurisdiction to prevent the issue of an arrest warrant. Attempts to make a citizen's arrest on the Pope were abandoned by Peter Tatchell. Members of Muslims Against Crusades protested against the Pope in London. The Guardian reported that around 10,000 protesters marched in London against the Pope's visit on 18 September 2010.

Sebastian Milbank of The Critic stated that anti-Catholic rhetoric by the New Atheist movement reached its peak during the Pope's visit, when "many mainstream newspapers (especially The Guardian) engaged in more or less naked anti-Catholic rhetoric of a sort that seemed more suited to the eighteenth century than the twenty-first".

== Media coverage ==
The BBC marked the visit with documentaries including:

- Vatican: The Hidden World, a profile of the Vatican with unprecedented access given
- The Real Joseph Ratzinger, a papal profile
- Newman: Saint or Sinner?, a documentary about Cardinal Newman
- Benedict - Trials of a Pope, a documentary about the life of the Pope

== See also ==
- List of journeys of Pope Benedict XVI
- Roman Catholicism in the United Kingdom
- Foreign Office papal visit memo
