= Apostolic Nunciature to Great Britain =

Diplomatic post of the Holy See

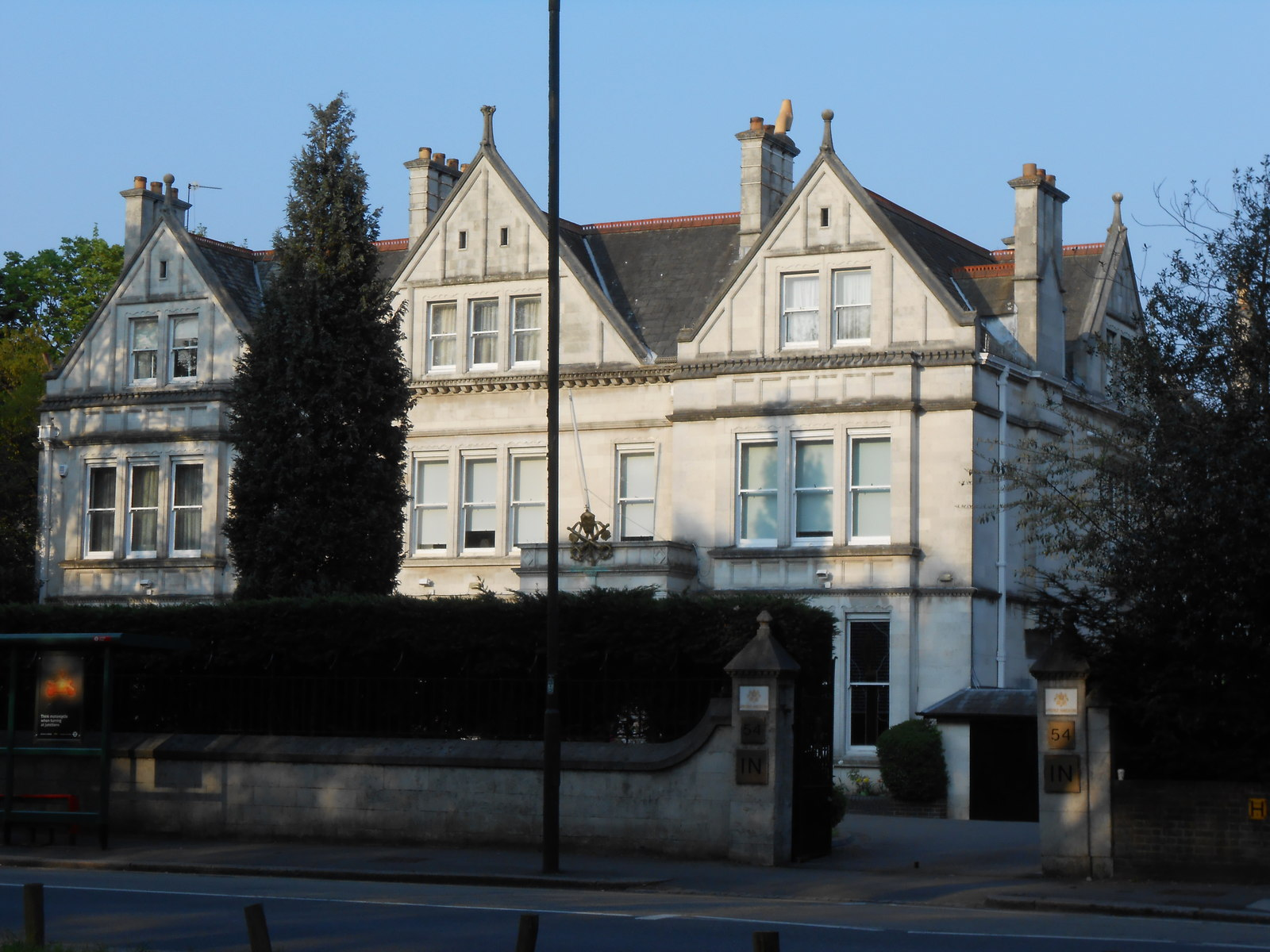
- Location: Wimbledon, London
- Address: 54 Parkside, London, SW19 5NE
- Coordinates: 51.4361°N 0.2239°W
- Apostolic Nuncio: Miguel Maury Buendía

The Apostolic Nunciature to Great Britain is the diplomatic office of the Holy See in Great Britain. It is headed by the Apostolic Nuncio, who has the rank of an ambassador (officially, the Apostolic Nuncio to the Court of St. James's). The parties agreed to exchange representatives at the ambassadorial level and Pope John Paul II erected the Nunciature to Great Britain on 17 January 1982. Before then, the interests of the Holy See in Great Britain had been represented by an Apostolic Delegate since 1938, though not granted diplomatic status until 1979. The decision to designate the nuncio to Great Britain rather than the United Kingdom reflected the complex and frequently antagonistic relationship between the Holy See and the British crown since they severed ties in the sixteenth century. British government sources said it had been agreed that the nuncio in London would concern himself with matters in England, Scotland and Wales, while the Apostolic Nuncio to Ireland, based in Dublin, would have within his purview the entire island of Ireland.

The office of the nunciature is in London, at 54 Parkside, in Wimbledon, lying within the Archdiocese of Southwark and overlooking Wimbledon Common. It was the only diplomatic mission in London located south of the river Thames until the United States Embassy opened its new premises in Vauxhall in 2018. The Nuncio to Great Britain is also the papal representative to Gibraltar.

The current nuncio as of April 2023 is Archbishop Miguel Maury Buendía.

== History ==
Formal diplomatic relations between the United Kingdom and the Holy See resumed in 1914 and an Apostolic Delegation to Great Britain was established on 21 November 1938. The Apostolic Delegation to Great Britain was promoted to the rank of an Apostolic Nunciature by Pope John Paul II in 1982.

== List of office holders ==
Office	From	Until	Post Holder	Notes
Apostolic Delegate to Great Britain	21 November 1938	10 November 1953	William Godfrey	Previously, a priest in Liverpool. Left after being appointed Archbishop of Liverpool
Apostolic Delegate to Great Britain	8 June 1954	16 July 1963	Gerald Patrick Aloysius O'Hara	Previously, Apostolic Nuncio to Ireland. Died in office
Apostolic Delegate to Great Britain	4 October 1963	19 April 1969	Igino Eugenio Cardinale	Left after being appointed Apostolic Nuncio to Belgium
Apostolic Delegate to Great Britain	26 April 1969	16 July 1973	Domenico Enrici	Previously, Apostolic Delegate to Australia. Left after being appointed an official of the Secretariat of State
Apostolic Delegate to Great Britain	16 July 1973	22 February 1982	Bruno Bernard Heim	Previously Apostolic Pro-Nuncio to the Arab Republic of Egypt. Retired
Apostolic Pro-Nuncio to Great Britain	22 February 1982	July 1985	Bruno Bernard Heim	Previously Apostolic Pro-Nuncio to the Arab Republic of Egypt. Retired
Apostolic Pro-Nuncio to Great Britain	21 January 1986	13 April 1993	Luigi Barbarito	Previously, Apostolic Pro-Nuncio to Australia. Retired
Apostolic Nuncio to Great Britain	13 April 1993	31 July 1997	Luigi Barbarito	Previously, Apostolic Pro-Nuncio to Australia. Retired
Apostolic Nuncio to Great Britain	31 July 1997	23 October 2004	Pablo Puente Buces	Previously, Apostolic Nuncio to Kuwait. Retired.
Apostolic Nuncio to Great Britain	11 December 2004	5 December 2010	Faustino Sainz Muñoz	Previously, Apostolic Nuncio to European Community. Retired.
Apostolic Nuncio to Great Britain	18 December 2010	1 March 2017	Antonio Mennini	Previously, Apostolic Nuncio to Uzbekistan. Subsequently appointed an official of the Secretariat of State
Apostolic Nuncio to Great Britain	8 April 2017	31 January 2020	Edward Joseph Adams	Previously, Apostolic Nuncio to Greece. Retired.
Apostolic Nuncio to Great Britain	4 July 2020	mid-January 2023	Claudio Gugerotti	Previously, Apostolic Nuncio to Ukraine. Subsequently appointed Prefect of the Dicastery for the Eastern Churches
Apostolic Nuncio to Great Britain	13 April 2023		Miguel Maury Buendía	Previously, Apostolic Nuncio to Romania and Moldova.

== See also ==
- List of diplomatic missions of the Holy See
- List of Ambassadors from the United Kingdom to the Holy See
- Holy See–United Kingdom relations
- 54 Parkside
