= Apostolic Nunciature to the European Union =

Diplomatic post of the Holy See

The Apostolic Nunciature to the European Union is an ecclesiastical office of the Catholic Church. It is a diplomatic post of the Holy See, whose representative is called the Apostolic Nuncio with the rank of an ambassador. Its offices are in Brussels, which serves as the de facto capital of the European Union (EU). It was called the Apostolic Nunciature to the European Community until 2009.

In 1963, the Holy See informed the European Economic Community (EEC), precursor to the European Community and the European Union, that it was interested in establishing diplomatic ties, its first with an international organization. (Note: The Holy See has not yet established its relationship with the United Nations and was understood to involve observer status on the part of the Holy See rather than an exchange of representatives.) Its overtures were blocked for several years first by French objections and then by the EEC's internal problems. Archbishop Igino Eugenio Cardinale, the Nuncio to Belgium, raised the issue anew in 1970 and proved successful.

== Representatives to the European Union ==
The first nuncio to the European Community was already Apostolic Nuncio to Belgium and Luxembourg when he was simultaneously given the position of Nuncio to the European Community and Permanent Observer of the Holy See to the Council of Europe. He held all four titles until his death in 1983. Since then the posts of representatives to the EU and the Council have been held by different diplomats, the Brussels post being reserved to one with the rank of Nuncio and the other assigned to a member of the diplomatic corps who has not acquired that title.

The second Nuncio to the European Community held simultaneous appointments to Belgium and Luxembourg. In 1999, the third Nuncio to the European Community was the first to hold it as his only position, a practice continued since then.

- Igino Eugenio Cardinale (10 November 1970 – 24 March 1983)
- Angelo Pedroni (6 July 1983 – 13 June 1989)
- Giovanni Moretti (15 July 1989 – 22 January 1999)
- Faustino Sainz Muñoz (22 January 1999 – 11 December 2004)
- André Dupuy (24 February 2005 – 15 December 2011)
- Alain Paul Lebeaupin (23 June 2012 – 16 November 2020)
- Aldo Giordano (8 May 2021 – 2 December 2021)
- Noël Treanor (26 November 2022 – 11 August 2024)
- Bernardito Auza (22 March 2025 – present)

== See also ==
- Holy See–European Union relations
- Foreign relations of the Holy See
- List of heads of the diplomatic missions of the Holy See
- Permanent Observer of the Holy See to the Council of Europe
