= Paolo Rudelli =

Italian Catholic prelate (born 1970)

The Most Reverend Paolo Rudelli
- Substitute of the Secretariat of State
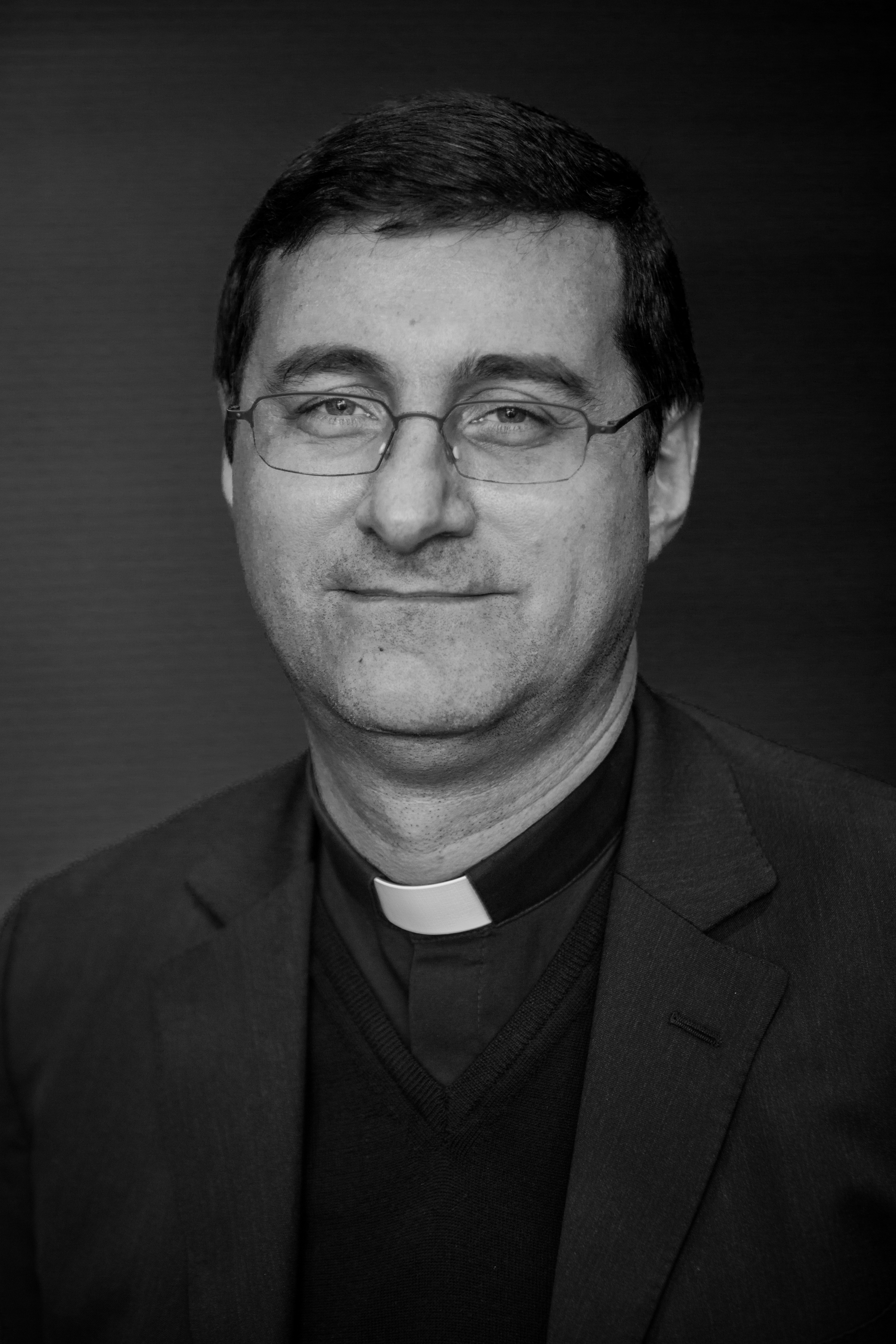
- Rudelli in 2015
- Church: Catholic
- Appointed: 19 July 2023
- Predecessor: Edgar Peña Parra
- Other post: Titular Archbishop of Mesembria (2019–)
- Previous posts: Permanent Observer of the Holy See to the Council of Europe (2014–2019); Apostolic Nuncio to Zimbabwe (2020-2023); Apostolic Nuncio to Colombia (2023–2026)

Orders
- Ordination: 10 June 1995 by Roberto Amadei
- Consecration: 4 October 2019 by Pope Francis

Personal details
- Born: 16 July 1970 (age 56) Gazzaniga, Bergamo, Italy
- Motto: Adveniat Regnum Tuum (Latin for 'Thy Kingdom come') (Note: From Matthew 6:10)

Styles of Paolo Rudelli
- Reference style: His Excellency; The Most Reverend
- Spoken style: Your Excellency
- Religious style: Archbishop

Paolo Rudelli (born 16 July 1970) is an Italian Catholic archbishop and former diplomat of the Holy See who has served as the Substitute for General Affairs for the Secretariat of State of the Holy See since March 2026.

== Biography ==
Rudelli was born on 16 July 1970 in Gazzaniga in Lombardy, Italy. He comes from Gandino in the Province of Bergamo. He entered the local seminary as a teenager and completed his preparation for the priesthood at the major seminary of the Diocese of Rome. On 10 June 1995, he was ordained a priest of the Diocese of Bergamo. He continued his theological studies at the Pontifical Gregorian University in Rome, where he received a doctoral degree in moral theology and a licentiate in canon law.

== Diplomatic career ==
In 1998, Rudelli began his preparation for the diplomatic service at the Pontifical Ecclesiastical Academy. On 1 July 2001, he entered the diplomatic service of the Holy See. He worked in the nunciatures in Ecuador (2001–2003) and Poland (2003–2006) and then in the Section for General Affairs of the Secretariat of State. He also served as Bursar of the Pontifical Ecclesiastical Academy from 2009 to 2014. While in Rome he served as secretary to Cardinal Leonardo Sandri.

On 20 September 2014, Pope Francis appointed him Permanent Observer of the Holy See to the Council of Europe in Strasbourg, just a month before Francis visited Strasbourg.

On 3 September 2019, Pope Francis named him a titular archbishop and gave him the title of apostolic nuncio. He was replaced in Strasbourg on 21 September 2019 by Marco Ganci. Rudelli received his episcopal consecration from Pope Francis on 4 October. On 25 January 2020, Pope Francis named him Apostolic Nuncio to Zimbabwe.

On 19 July 2023, Pope Francis appointed him as apostolic nuncio to Colombia.

On 30 March 2026, Pope Leo XIV named him Substitute for General Affairs of the Secretariat of State, succeeding Edgar Peña Parra. He took office on 8 April. His appointment was seen as demonstrating that Parolin still has significant influence on decisions and enjoys the trust of Leo XIV.

== Writings ==
- Matrimonio come scelta di vita. Opzione vocazione sacramento. Rome: Gregorian & Biblical Press. 2004. ISBN 9788878390140.

== Notes ==
Diplomatic posts
Preceded by Aldo Giordano	Permanent Observer of the Holy See to the Council of Europe; 2014-2019	Succeeded by Marco Ganci
Preceded by Marek Zalewski	Apostolic Nuncio Zimbabwe; 2020-2023	Succeeded by Janusz Urbańczyk
Preceded by Luis Mariano Montemayor	Apostolic Nuncio Colombia; 2023-2026	Succeeded by TBA
Catholic Church titles
Preceded by Edgar Pena Parra	Substitute for General Affairs of the Secretariat of State; 2026–present	Succeeded by Incumbent
