= Bartolomeo Arbotori =

Italian painter (1594–1676)

Bartolomeo Arbotori (20 April 1650 in Piacenza – 23 August 1732 in Parma) was an Italian painter of the Baroque period, active mainly in Piacenza and Parma. He is known for still-life paintings of live and dead game, including animals, birds, and fish. Felice Boselli painted in his studio.
