= Apostolic Nunciature to Belgium =

Diplomatic post of the Holy See

Coordinates: 50°49′37″N 4°25′10.5″E

The Apostolic Nuncio to Belgium is the holder of a diplomatic position within the Catholic Church, who acts as Ambassador of the Holy See to Belgium.

Diplomatic relations between the Belgian state and the Holy See began in 1835. Until then, diplomatic relations for Catholics living on Belgian territories were secured by the vice-superior of the Dutch Mission.

The Apostolic Nuncio to Belgium is usually also the Apostolic Nuncio to Luxembourg upon his appointment to said nation

== Papal representatives to Belgium ==
Apostolic Internuncios

- Pasquale Gizzi (1835–1837)

Apostolic Nuncios

- Raffaele Fornari (1842–1843)
- Vincenzo Gioacchino Raffaele Luigi Pecci (28 Jan 1843 – 1846), later Pope Leo XIII
- Innocenzo Ferrieri (15 November 1848 – 30 September 1850)
- Matteo Eustachio Gonella (13 June 1850 – 1 October 1861)
- Mieczyslaw Halka Ledóchowski (1 October 1861 – 8 January 1866)
- Luigi Oreglia di Santo Stefano (15 May 1866 – 29 May 1868)
- Giacomo Cattani (24 July 1868 – 27 April 1875)
- Serafino Vannutelli (10 September 1875 – 3 December 1880)
- Domenico Ferrata (14 April 1885 – 20 April 1889)
- Giuseppe Francica-Nava de Bontifè † (4 May 1889)
- Benedetto Lorenzelli (30 May 1893 – 1 October 1896)
- Aristide Rinaldini (14 August 1896 – 28 December 1899)
- Gennaro Granito Pignatelli di Belmonte (10 November 1899)
- Antonio Vico (4 February 1904 – 21 October 1907)
- Giovanni Tacci Porcelli (31 December 1907 – 29 April 1911)
- Achille Locatelli (8 July 1916 – 13 July 1918)
- Sebastiano Nicotra (1 October 1918 – July 1923)
- Angelo Dolci (14 December 1922 – 30 May 1923)
- Clemente Micara (30 May 1923 – 11 November 1950)
- Fernando Cento (9 March 1946 – 26 October 1953)
- Efrem Forni (9 November 1953 – 19 March 1962)
- Silvio Oddi (17 May 1962 – 30 April 1969)
- Igino Eugenio Cardinale (19 April 1969 – 24 March 1983)
- Angelo Pedroni (6 July 1983 – 13 June 1989)
- Giovanni Moretti (15 July 1989 – 3 March 1999)
- Pier Luigi Celata (3 March 1999 – 14 November 2002)
- Karl-Josef Rauber (22 February 2003 – 18 June 2009)
- Giacinto Berloco (18 June 2009 – 23 September 2016)
- Augustine Kasujja (12 October 2016 – 31 August 2021)
- Franco Coppola (15 November 2021 – 5 November 2026)

== See also ==
- Apostolic Nunciature to Flanders (1596–1634; 1725–1795)
