= Giovanni Moretti (bishop) =

Italian Roman Catholic prelate (1923–2018)

- Titular Bishop of Vartana
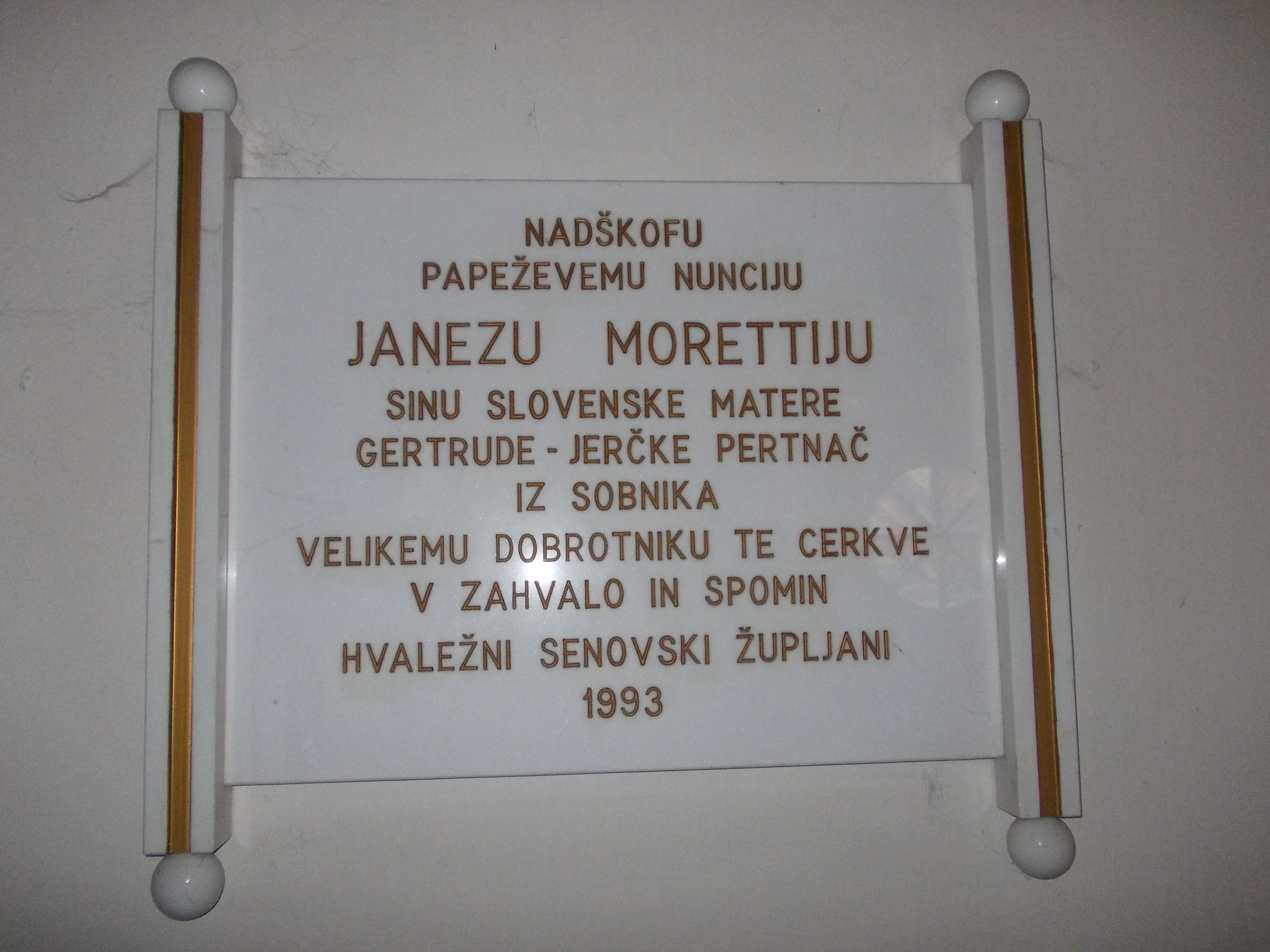
- Church: Roman Catholic Church
- See: Titular See of Vartana
- In office: 1971–2018
- Predecessor: Carlo Minchiatti
- Successor: vacant

Orders
- Ordination: 28 June 1947 by Leone Giacomo Ossola
- Consecration: 24 October 1971 by Opilio Rossi

Personal details
- Born: 20 November 1923; Meina, Italy
- Died: 16 October 2018 (aged 94); Meina, Italy

Giovanni Moretti (20 November 1923 – 16 October 2018) was an Italian prelate of the Catholic Church who worked in the diplomatic service of the Holy See.

== Biography ==
Moretti was born in Meina on 20 November 1923 and ordained a priest on 28 June 1947.

To prepare for a diplomatic career he entered the Pontifical Ecclesiastical Academy in 1955.

Pope Paul VI appointed him Apostolic Pro-Nuncio to Thailand, and Apostolic Delegate to Malaysia, Singapore, and Laos on 9 September 1971.

He received his episcopal consecration on 24 October 1971 from Archbishop Opilio Rossi.

Moretti was appointed Apostolic Pro-Nuncio to Sudan and Apostolic Delegate to the Red Sea Region on 30 March 1978.

Pope John Paul II named him Apostolic Nuncio to Egypt on 10 July 1984.

He was appointed Apostolic Nuncio to Belgium, to Luxembourg, and to the European Community on 15 July 1989.

He retired when replaced in his European Community post on 22 January 1999 and in his posts to Belgium and Luxembourg on 3 March 1999.

He died on 16 October 2018.
