= Silvio Oddi =

Italian prelate (1910–2001)

His Eminence Silvio Oddi
- Cardinal-Priest pro hac vice of Sant'Agata de' Goti
- Church: Catholic Church
- Installed: 28 April 1969
- Term ended: 29 June 2001
- Predecessor: Enrico Dante
- Successor: Tomáš Špidlík
- Previous posts: Apostolic Delegate to Jerusalem and Palestine (1953–1957); Titular Archbishop of Mesmbria (1953–1969); Apostolic Nuncio to Belgium (1962–1969); Apostolic Nuncio to Luxembourg (1962–1969); President of the Commission of Cardinals for the Pontifical Shrines of Pompeii and Loreto (1969–1974); Prefect of the Congregation for the Clergy (1979–1986); Camerlengo of the Sacred College of Cardinals (1984–1987)

Orders
- Ordination: 21 May 1933 by Ersilio Menzani
- Consecration: 27 September 1953 by Angelo Giuseppe Roncalli (later John XXIII)
- Created cardinal: 28 April 1969 by Pope Paul VI
- Rank: Cardinal-Priest

Personal details
- Born: Silvio Angelo Pio Oddi; 14 November 1910 Morfasso, near Piacenza, Kingdom of Italy
- Died: 29 June 2001 (aged 90) Cortemaggiore, Italy
- Buried: Morfasso
- Denomination: Catholicism
- Education: Collegio Alberoni; Pontifical University of Saint Thomas Aquinas; Pontifical Ecclesiastical Academy
- Motto: Dominus Fortitudo ("The Lord is (my) strength")
- Coat of arms

Silvio Angelo Pio Oddi (14 November 1910 – 29 June 2001) was an Italian prelate of the Catholic Church who worked in the diplomatic service of the Holy See and in the Roman Curia. He became a cardinal in 1969 and headed the Congregation for the Clergy from 1979 to 1986.

== Biography ==
Silvio Oddi was born in Morfasso, near Piacenza, Italy, on 14 November 1910. He studied at the Collegio Alberoni in Piacenza from 1926 to 1933 (philosophy, theology and moral). He was ordained a priest on 21 May 1933 in Rome, and continued his studies at the Pontifical University of Saint Thomas Aquinas, Angelicum. He entered the Pontifical Ecclesiastical Academy in 1934 and entered the diplomatic service of the Holy See in 1936. He was assigned to the Apostolic Delegation to Iran until 1939. From that year until 1945 he held a similar post in Syria and Lebanon, then in Egypt (1945–1948), and France (1948–1951).

He became the senior official, chargé d'affaires, of the Apostolic Nunciature to Yugoslavia in 1951. When the Vatican stonewalled the government's attempt to negotiate an agreement and instead Pope Pius XII made the regime's most prominent critic, Archbishop Aloysius Stepinac, a cardinal, the government expelled Oddi on 17 December 1952.

On 30 July 1953, Pope Pius XII named him Titular Bishop of Mesembria and Apostolic Delegate for Palestine, Transjordan and Cyprus. On 27 September of the same year, he received his episcopal ordination from Angelo Giuseppe Roncalli, the future Pope John XXIII.

He was named Apostolic Internuncio to Egypt on 11 January 1957. He was named Nuncio to Belgium and to Luxembourg on 17 May 1962.

He took part in the Second Vatican Council (1962–1965). Pope Paul VI created him a cardinal on 28 April 1969, assigning to him the titular church of Sant'Agata dei Goti. He named him Papal Legate for the Patriarchal Basilica of Saint Francis in Assisi and gave him responsibility for the shrine of Loreto as well. Pope John Paul II named him Prefect of the Congregation for the Clergy on 28 September 1979. He retired at the age of 75 upon the appointment of his successor Antonio Innocenti on 9 January 1986. In 1989 he attended, as Papal Legate, the funeral of Japanese Emperor Hirohito.

- Spiritual Protector of the Military and Hospitaller Order of Saint Lazarus of Jerusalem (Malta Obedience)
- Cardinal Patron of the Militia Templi, a groups of Catholic knights based in Tuscany.

In his memoirs, written in his later years, he criticized Pope John Paul II for canonizing too many saints, turning the Vatican into a "saint factory", a rather rare instance of public criticism. He died on 29 June 2001 in Cortemaggiore and was buried in the parish church of Morfasso.
