= Apostolic Nunciature to Cambodia =

Diplomatic post of the Holy See

The Apostolic Nunciature to Cambodia is an ecclesiastical office of the Catholic Church in Cambodia. It is a diplomatic post of the Holy See, whose representative is called the Apostolic Nuncio with the rank of an ambassador. The title Apostolic Nuncio to Cambodia is held by the prelate appointed Apostolic Nuncio to Thailand; he resides in Thailand.

The Holy See managed its affairs in Cambodia through a Delegation to Indochina established on 20 May 1925. Pope John XXIII changed its name to the Delegation to Vietnam and Cambodia on 17 June 1964. Relations were interrupted when the government fell to the Khmer Rouge in 1975. After the restoration of the monarchy in 1993, a new mission was established on 16 July 1994 as the Apostolic Nunciature to the Kingdom of Cambodia.

== List of papal representatives to Cambodia ==
Delegates to Indochina

- Costantino Aiuti (28 May 1925 – 29 July 1928)
- Victor Colomban Dreyer (24 November 1928 – November 1936)
- Antonin-Fernand Drapier (28 November 1936 – April 1950)
- John Jarlath Dooley (18 October 1951 – September 1959)
- Mario Brini (12 September 1959 – 13 June 1962)
- Salvatore Asta (13 October 1962 – 23 March 1964)

Apostolic Delegate to Vietnam and Cambodia

- Angelo Palmas (17 June 1964 – 19 April 1969)
- Henri Lemaître (30 May 1969 - 19 December 1975)

Apostolic Nuncios

- Luigi Bressan (16 July 1994 - 25 March 1999)
- Adriano Bernardini (24 July 1999 - 26 April 2003)
- Salvatore Pennacchio (20 September 2003 - 8 May 2010)
- Giovanni d'Aniello (22 September 2010 - 10 February 2012)
- Paul Tschang In-Nam (4 August 2012 – 16 July 2022)
- Peter Bryan Wells (8 February 2023 – present)
