= Apostolic Nunciature to Singapore =

Diplomatic mission of the Holy See in Asia

The Apostolic Nunciature to Singapore is a top-level diplomatic mission assigned by the Holy See to Singapore. The Holy See is represented by an Apostolic Nuncio, a position comparable to that of ambassador, but with ecclesiastical responsibilities in addition to those that concern the relationship with the government of Singapore.

Before the Holy See named its first Apostolic Delegate to Singapore in 1981, the Apostolic Delegate to Thailand, Laos, and the Malacca Peninsula (first appointed in 1968) was responsible for maintaining its interests in Singapore (officially ecclesiastic and informally intergovernmental.) The Malacca Peninsula is more commonly known as the Malay Peninsula and comprised the western section of Malaysia (Peninsular Malaysia) and Singapore.

The Apostolic Nuncio to Singapore is usually also the Papal Representative to Vietnam upon his appointment to said nation.

== List of papal representatives ==
Apostolic Delegates to Thailand, Laos, and the Malacca Peninsula

- John Gordon (10 February 1962 – 27 February 1965)
- Angelo Pedroni (7 April 1965 - 1967)
- Jean Jadot (28 February 1968 – 15 May 1971)

Apostolic Delegates to Laos, Malaysia, and Singapore

- Giovanni Moretti (9 September 1971 – 13 March 1978)
- Silvio Luoni (15 May 1978 – 1980)
- Renato Raffaele Martino (14 September 1980 – 24 June 1981)

Apostolic Delegates to Singapore

- Renato Raffaele Martino (24 June 1981 - 3 December 1986)

Apostolic Pro-Nuncio to Singapore

- Alberto Tricarico (28 February 1987 - 26 July 1993)

Apostolic Nuncios to Singapore

- Luigi Bressan (26 July 1993 - 25 March 1999)
- Adriano Bernardini (24 July 1999 - 26 April 2003)
- Salvatore Pennacchio (20 September 2003 – 8 May 2010)
- Leopoldo Girelli (13 January 2011 - 13 September 2017)
- Marek Zalewski (21 May 2018 – present)
