= Apostolic Nunciature to Thailand =

Diplomatic Mission of the Holy See in Thailand

- Location: Bangkok 10120, Thailand
- Address: 217, 1 S Sathorn Rd, Yan Nawa, Sathon, Bangkok 10120, Thailand
- Coordinates: 13°43′10.3″N 100°31′23.3″E
- Apostolic Nuncio: Archbishop Peter Bryan Wells

The Apostolic Nunciature to Thailand is the diplomatic mission of the Holy See to Thailand. It is located in Sathon District, Bangkok. The current Apostolic Nuncio is Archbishop Peter Bryan Wells, who was named to the position by Pope Francis on 8 February 2023.

The Apostolic Nunciature to the Kingdom of Thailand is an ecclesiastical office of the Catholic Church in Thailand, with the rank of an embassy. The nuncio serves both as the ambassador of the Holy See to the King of Thailand, and as delegate and point-of-contact between the Catholic hierarchy in Thailand and the Pope.

The Apostolic Nuncio to Thailand is usually also the Apostolic Nuncio to Cambodia, Myanmar and Apostolic Delegate to Laos upon his appointment to said nations.

== Papal representatives to Thailand ==
Apostolic Delegates to Thailand, Laos, and the Malacca Peninsula

- John Gordon (10 February 1962 – 27 February 1965)
- Angelo Pedroni (7 April 1965 - 1967)
- Jean Jadot (28 February 1968 – 15 May 1971)

Apostolic Pro-Nuncios to Thailand

- Giovanni Moretti (9 September 1971 – 13 March 1978)
- Silvio Luoni (15 May 1978 - 1980)
- Renato Raffaele Martino (14 September 1980 – 3 December 1986)
- Alberto Tricarico (28 February 1987 – 26 July 1993)

Apostolic Nuncios to Thailand

- Luigi Bressan (26 July 1993 – 25 March 1999)
- Adriano Bernardini (24 July 1999 – 26 April 2003)
- Salvatore Pennacchio (20 September 2003 – 8 May 2010)
- Giovanni d'Aniello (22 September 2010 - 10 February 2012)
- Paul Tschang In-Nam (4 August 2012 - 16 July 2022)
- Peter Bryan Wells (8 February 2023 – present)
