= Apostolic Nunciature to Malaysia =

Diplomatic post of the Holy See

Apostolic Nunciature to Malaysia Nuntiaturae Apostolicae in Malaesiā Nunziatura Apostolica in Malesia Nunsiatur Apostolik untuk Malaysia
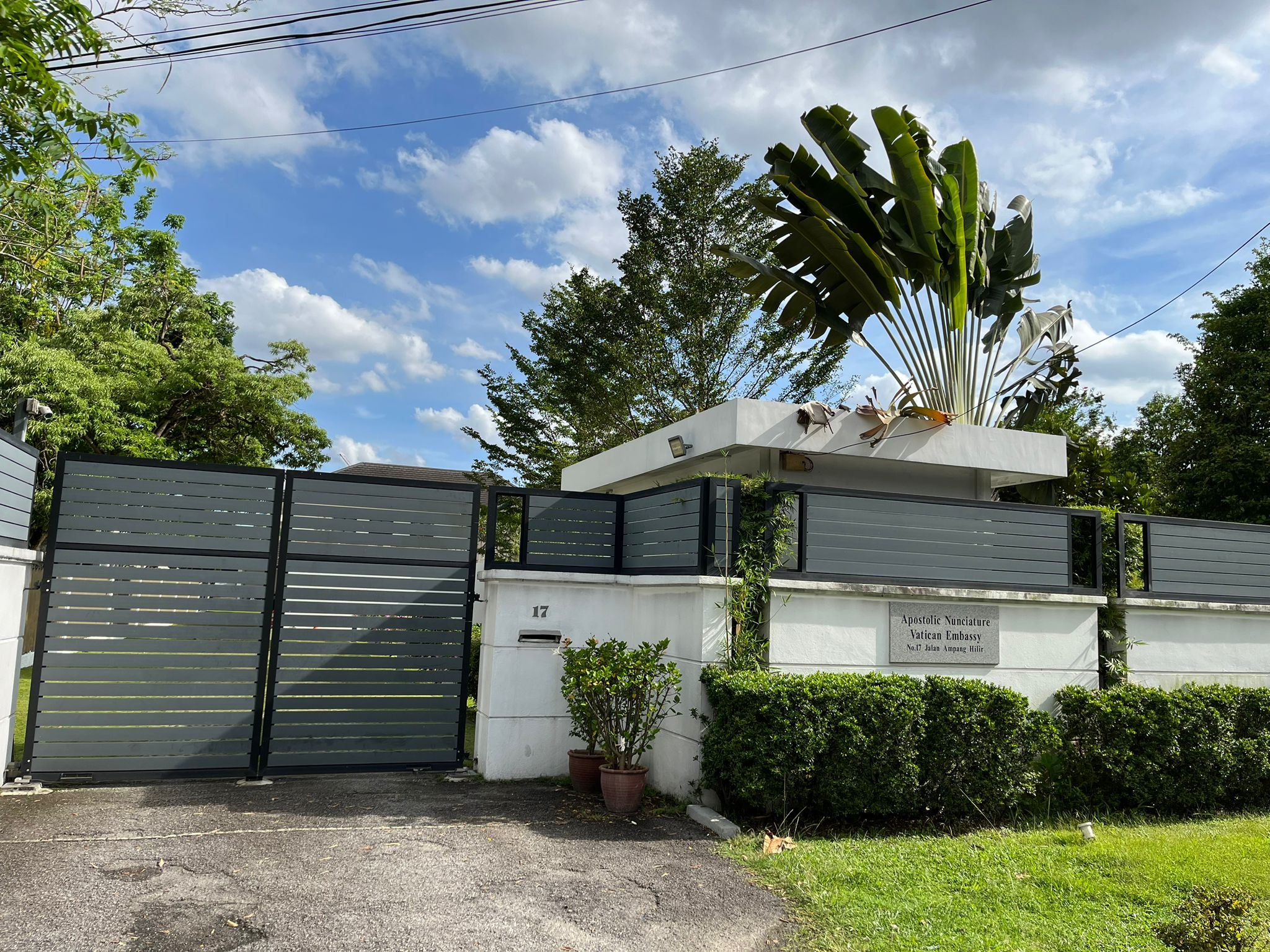
- Location: Kuala Lumpur
- Address: 17, Jalan Ampang Hilir, Taman U Thant, 55000 Kuala Lumpur, Wilayah Persekutuan Kuala Lumpur, Malaysia
- Coordinates: 3°9′28.63″N 101°43′57.3″E
- Apostolic Nuncio: Archbishop Wojciech Załuski

The Apostolic Nunciature to Malaysia is the diplomatic mission of the Holy See to Malaysia, equivalent to an embassy. It is located at 17 Jalan Ampang Hilir, Kuala Lumpur.

The Delegation to Malaysia was raised to the rank of Nunciature to Malaysia on 27 July 2011, when Malaysia became the 179th state to establish diplomatic relations with the Holy See.

The Apostolic Nunciature to Malaysia is an ecclesiastical office of the Catholic Church in Malaysia, with the rank of ambassador. The nuncio serves both as the ambassador of the Pope (as head of State of Vatican City) to the King of Malaysia, and as delegate and point-of-contact between the Catholic hierarchy in Malaysia and the Pope (as head of the church).

The nunciature's building, constructed during the tenure of Archbishop Joseph Marino as Nuncio (2013–2019), was the Holy See's first "totally environmentally friendly" nunciature.

The Apostolic Nuncio to Malaysia is usually also the Apostolic Nuncio to East Timor and Apostolic Delegate to Brunei Darussalam upon his appointment to said nations.

== List of papal representatives ==
Apostolic Delegates to Thailand, Laos, and the Malacca Peninsula

- John Gordon (10 February 1962 – 27 February 1965)
- Angelo Pedroni (7 April 1965 - 1967)
- Jean Jadot (23 February 1968 - 15 May 1971)

Apostolic Delegates to Laos, Malaysia, and Singapore

- Giovanni Moretti (9 September 1971 - 13 March 1978)
- Silvio Luoni (15 May 1978 - 1980)
- Renato Raffaele Martino (14 September 1980 – 24 June 1981)

Apostolic Delegates to Laos and Malaysia

- Renato Raffaele Martino (24 June 1981 – 7 December 1983)

Apostolic Delegates to Malaysia and Brunei

- Renato Raffaele Martino (7 December 1983 – 3 December 1986)
- Alberto Tricarico (28 February 1987 - 26 July 1993)
- Luigi Bressan (26 July 1993 – 1998)

Apostolic Delegates to Malaysia

- Luigi Bressan (1998 – 25 March 1999)
- Adriano Bernardini (24 July 1999 - 26 April 2003)
- Salvatore Pennacchio (20 September 2003 - 8 May 2010)
- Leopoldo Girelli (13 January 2011 - 16 January 2013)

Apostolic Nuncios to Malaysia

- Joseph Marino (16 January 2013 – 11 October 2019)
- Wojciech Załuski (29 September 2020 – 28 February 2026)

== See also ==
- Holy See–Malaysia relations
- List of diplomatic missions of the Holy See
