= Holy See–Malaysia relations =

- Holy See: Malaysia

Diplomatic mission
- Apostolic Nunciature to Malaysia: Malaysian Embassy, Holy See

Envoy
- Apostolic Nuncio Wojciech Załuski: Ambassador-Designate Hendy Assan

Holy See–Malaysia relations (Latin: rationes Sancta Sedes et Malaesia; Italian: Relazioni tra Santa Sede e Malesia; French: Relations entre le Saint-Siège et la Malaisie; Malay: Hubungan Malaysia–Takhta Suci; Jawi: هوبوڠن مليسيا–تختا سوچي) are foreign relations between the Holy See and Malaysia.

The current Ambassador-Designate of Malaysia to the Holy See is Mr. Hendy Assan, while the current Apostolic Nuncio to Malaysia is Archbishop Wojciech Załuski.

== History ==
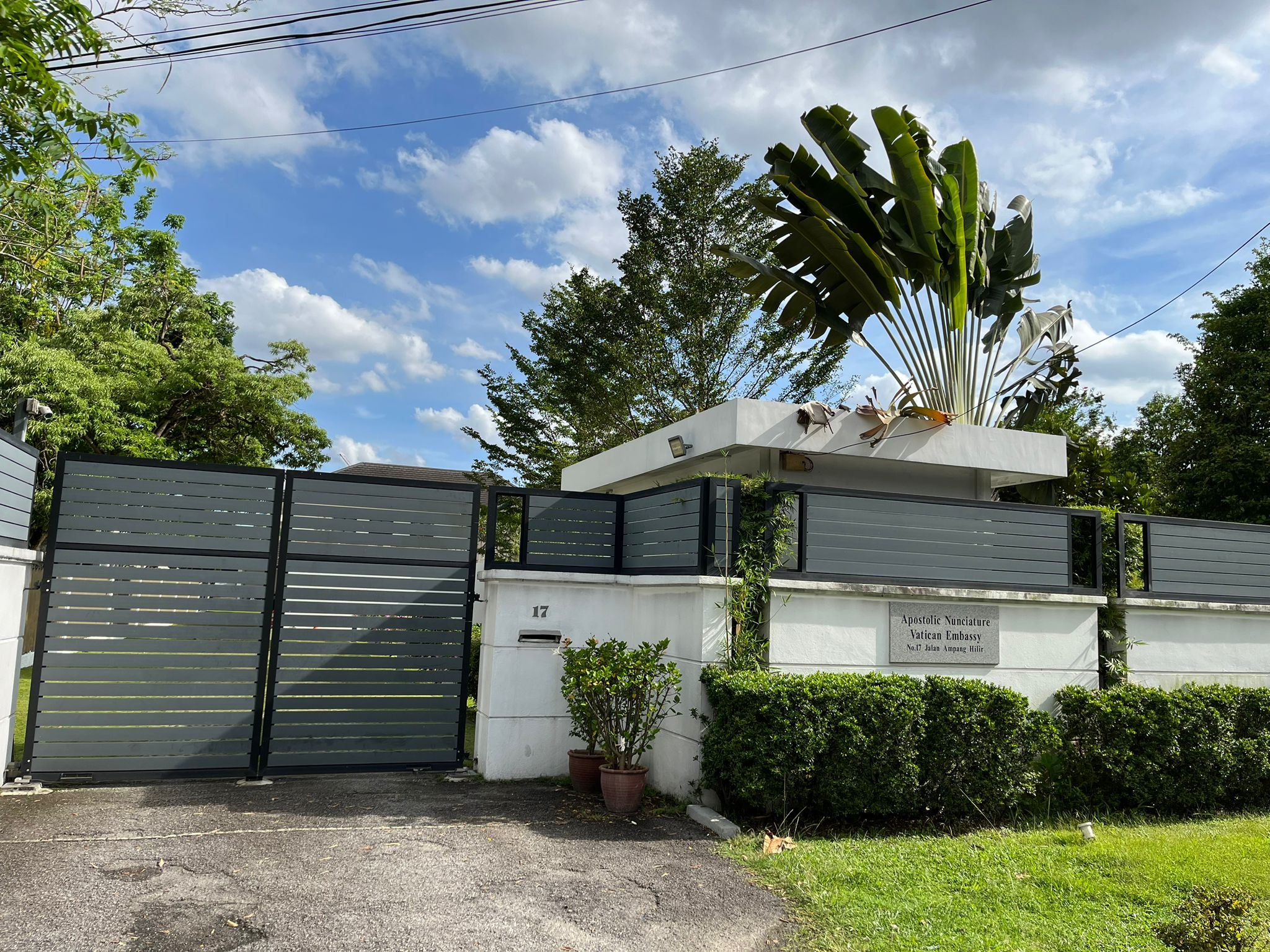
Apostolic Nunciature to Malaysia in Kuala Lumpur

Pope Leo XIII had an audience with Sultan Abu Bakar and his brother Ungku Muhammad Khalid of precedent entity Johor on 24 April 1885; the sultan had arranged privately through Cardinal Edward Henry Howard, who had experience with contact of Prince Prisdang who arrived a year before as a private function on behalf of Chulalongkorn king of Siam. Abu Bakar's secretary Abdul Rahman Andak among the sultan's entourage personally anecdoted later in 1894 that the Malay Peninsula did appear marked on one of the Vatican's gallery maps prior because of Abu Bakar's correspondence with Apostolic Vicar Edouard Gasnier in his Singapore office.

In 2002, Prime Minister Mahathir Mohamad visited the Vatican to meet Pope John Paul II. During the second visit of the next Malaysian Prime Minister, Najib Razak and Pope Benedict XVI at the Apostolic Palace in Castel Gandolfo, an agreement to establish diplomatic relations between the Holy See and Malaysia was finalised. Malaysia became the 179th state to establish diplomatic relations with the Holy See.

The Holy See previously had an apostolic delegation, based in Bangkok, for the country. Pending the appointment of the first Nuncio to Malaysia, the papal representative in Bangkok continued to act as Apostolic Delegate for Malaysia, accredited to the Catholic Church in the country but not to the Government. In January 2013, Archbishop Joseph Marino was appointed as the first nuncio to Malaysia.

In 2016, Malaysia appointed Bernard Giluk Dompok as the first resident ambassador to the Holy See. In 2017, the Holy See opens its official chancery in Kuala Lumpur.

== See also ==
- Foreign relations of the Holy See
- Foreign relations of Malaysia
