= Apostolic Delegation to Laos =

Diplomatic post of the Holy See

The Apostolic Delegation to Laos represents the interests of the Holy See in Laos to officials of the Catholic Church, civil society, and government offices. The Holy See and the government of Laos have not established diplomatic relations and the position of Apostolic Delegate to Laos is not a diplomatic one, though the Delegate is a member of the diplomatic service of the Holy See. The Delegate normally holds the title Apostolic Nuncio to Thailand and resides in Bangkok.

The Holy See has managed its affairs in Laos through a delegation that has changed its name as the Holy See has established diplomatic relations with countries in the region. It established the Delegation to Thailand, Laos, and the Malacca Peninsula, then the Delegation to Laos and Malaysia in 1981. Pope John Paul II created the Delegation to Laos on 7 December 1983.

== Papal representatives to Laos ==
Apostolic Delegates to Thailand, Laos, and the Malacca Peninsula

- John Gordon (10 February 1962 – 27 February 1965)
- Angelo Pedroni (7 April 1965 - 1967)
- Jean Jadot (28 February 1968 - 15 May 1971)

Apostolic Delegates to Laos, Malaysia, and Singapore

- Giovanni Moretti (9 September 1971 - 13 March 1978)
- Silvio Luoni (15 May 1978 - 1980)
- Renato Raffaele Martino (14 September 1980 – 7 December 1983)

Apostolic Delegate to Laos

- Renato Raffaele Martino (7 December 1983 – 3 December 1986)
- Alberto Tricarico (28 February 1987 - 26 July 1993)
- Luigi Bressan (26 July 1993 - 25 March 1999)
- Adriano Bernardini (24 July 1999 - 26 April 2003)
- Salvatore Pennacchio (20 September 2003 - 8 May 2010)
- Giovanni d'Aniello (22 September 2010 - 10 February 2012)
- Paul Tschang In-Nam (4 August 2012 – 16 July 2022)
- Peter Bryan Wells (8 February 2023 – present)
