= Salvatore Pennacchio =

Italian Catholic archbishop and diplomat

His Excellency, The Most Reverend Salvatore Pennacchio
- Apostolic Nuncio and president of the Pontifical Ecclesiastical Academy; Titular Archbishop of Montemarano
- Appointed: 25 January 2023
- Predecessor: Joseph Marino
- Other post: Titular Archbishop of Montemarano
- Previous posts: Apostolic Nuncio to Poland (2016-2023); Apostolic Nuncio to India and Nepal (2010-2016); Apostolic Nuncio to Cambodia, Singapore, Thailand and Apostolic Delegate to Brunei, Laos, Malaysia and Myanmar (2003-2010); Apostolic Nuncio to Rwanda (1998-2003)

Orders
- Ordination: 18 September 1976 by Antonio Cece
- Consecration: 6 January 1999 by Pope John Paul II, Giovanni Battista Re and Francesco Monterisi

Personal details
- Born: 7 September 1952 (age 74) Marano, Italy
- Profession: President of the Pontifical Ecclesiastical Academy
- Motto: Nolite timere
- Coat of arms

Styles of Salvatore Pennacchio
- Reference style: His Excellency; The Most Reverend
- Spoken style: Your Excellency
- Religious style: Archbishop

Salvatore Pennacchio (born 7 September 1952 in Marano, Italy) is an Italian prelate of the Catholic Church and diplomat of the Holy See, currently president of the Pontifical Ecclesiastical Academy.

== Biography ==
He received his priestly ordination on 18 September 1976 for the Diocese of Aversa. He attended the Pontifical Ecclesiastical Academy and entered the diplomatic service of the Holy See. On 28 November 1998, he was appointed by Pope John Paul II as the apostolic nuncio to Rwanda and titular archbishop of Montemarano. He received episcopal consecration on 6 January 1999 by Pope John Paul II, co-consecrated by Giovanni Battista Re and Francis Monterisi.

On 20 September 2003 he was appointed apostolic nuncio to Thailand, to Singapore, and to Cambodia, as well as apostolic delegate to Myanmar, to Laos, to Malaysia and to Brunei.

On 8 May 2010, Pope Benedict XVI appointed him Apostolic Nuncio to India and on 13 November 2010 to Nepal. On 6 August 2016, Pope Francis appointed him Apostolic Nuncio to Poland.

On 25 January 2023, Pope Francis appointed him as president of the Pontifical Ecclesiastical Academy.

== See also ==
- List of heads of the diplomatic missions of the Holy See

Diplomatic posts
Preceded by Juliusz Janusz	Apostolic Nuncio to Rwanda; 28 November 1998 – 20 September 2003	Succeeded by Anselmo Guido Pecorari
Preceded by Adriano Bernardini	Apostolic Nuncio to Thailand; 20 September 2003 – 8 May 2010	Succeeded by Giovanni d'Aniello
Preceded by Adriano Bernardini	Apostolic Nuncio to Singapore; 20 September 2003 – 8 May 2010	Succeeded by Leopoldo Girelli
Preceded by Adriano Bernardini	Apostolic Nuncio to Cambodia; 20 September 2003 – 8 May 2010	Succeeded by Giovanni d'Aniello
Preceded by Adriano Bernardini	Apostolic Delegate to Myanmar; 20 September 2003 – 8 May 2010	Succeeded by Giovanni d'Aniello
Preceded by Adriano Bernardini	Apostolic Delegate to Laos; 20 September 2003 – 8 May 2010	Succeeded by Giovanni d'Aniello
Preceded by Adriano Bernardini	Apostolic Delegate to Malaysia; 20 September 2003 – 8 May 2010	Succeeded by Leopoldo Girelli
Preceded by Adriano Bernardini	Apostolic Delegate to Brunei; 20 September 2003 – 8 May 2010	Succeeded by Leopoldo Girelli
Preceded by Pedro López Quintana	Apostolic Nuncio to India; 8 May 2010 – 6 August 2016	Succeeded by Giambattista Diquattro
Preceded by Pedro López Quintana	Apostolic Nuncio to Nepal; 13 November 2010 – 6 August 2016	Succeeded by Giambattista Diquattro
Preceded by Celestino Migliore	Apostolic Nuncio to Poland; 6 August 2016 – 25 January 2023	Succeeded by vacant
Educational offices
Preceded by Joseph Marino	President of the Pontifical Ecclesiastical Academy; 2023–present	Incumbent
