= Avellino (surname) =

Avellino is an Italian surname. Notable people with the surname include:

- Andrew Avellino (1521–1608), Italian saint
- Giulio Giacinto Avellino (c.1645–c.1700), Italian painter
- Natalie Avellino (born 1970), Australian netballer
- Onofrio Avellino (c.1764–1741), Italian painter
- Salvatore Avellino (born 1935), Italian mobster and caporegime
