= Kevin Randall =

Kevin Randall may refer to:

- Kevin Randall (footballer), English football player and manager
- Kevin D. Randle, American ufologist, science fiction and historical fiction writer
- Kevin Stuart Randall, American prelate of the Catholic Church
