= Paul Tschang In-Nam =

Korean prelate of the Catholic Church (born 1949)

His Excellency, The Most Reverend Paul Tschang In-nam
- Apostolic Nuncio Emeritus to the Netherlands; Titular Archbishop of Amantia
- Native name: 장인남 바오로
- Appointed: 16 July 2022
- Retired: 13 February 2025
- Predecessor: Aldo Cavalli
- Other post: Titular Archbishop of Amantia
- Previous posts: Apostolic Nuncio to Thailand, Cambodia, Myanmar and Apostolic Delegate to Laos (2012-2022); Apostolic Delegate to Myanmar (2012-2017); Apostolic Nuncio to Uganda (2007–2012); Apostolic Nuncio to Bangladesh (2002–2007)

Orders
- Ordination: 17 December 1976 by Nicholas Cheong Jin-suk
- Consecration: 6 January 2003 by Pope John Paul II, Leonardo Sandri and Antonio Maria Vegliò

Personal details
- Born: 30 October 1949 (age 76) Seoul, South Korea
- Denomination: Catholicism
- Education: Gwangju Catholic University; Pontifical Lateran University
- Motto: Dominus illuminatio mea ('The Lord is my light', Psalms 27:1)
- Coat of arms

Styles of Paul Tschang In-Nam
- Reference style: His Excellency; The Most Reverend
- Spoken style: Your Excellency
- Religious style: Archbishop

- Paul Tschang In-Nam
- Hangul: 장인남
- Hanja: 張仁南
- RR: Jang Innam
- MR: Chang Innam

Paul Tschang In-Nam (born 30 October 1949) is a Korean Catholic prelate who has served as apostolic nuncio to the Netherlands from 2022 to 2025. He worked in the diplomatic service of the Holy See beginning in 1985, with the title of archbishop and the office of apostolic nuncio since 2002. He was the first Korean apostolic nuncio.

== Biography ==
Paul Tschang In-Nam was born in Seoul, South Korea, on 30 October 1949. He graduated from the Gwangju Catholic University. He was ordained a priest on 17 December 1976. He did parish work and was undersecretary of the Catholic Bishops' Conference of Korea for several years, then studied in Rome from 1978 to 1985, earning a doctorate in dogmatic theology at the Pontifical Lateran University.

=== Diplomatic career ===
He joined the diplomatic service of the Holy See on 1 May 1985. His assignments took him to El Salvador, Ethiopia, Syria, France, Greece, and Belgium.

On 19 October 2002, Pope John Paul II appointed him titular archbishop of Amantia and named him Apostolic Nuncio to Bangladesh. He received his episcopal consecration from John Paul on 6 January 2003. On 27 August 2007, Pope Benedict XVI named him Apostolic Nuncio to Uganda.

Pope Benedict XVI appointed him Apostolic Nuncio to Thailand and Cambodia and Apostolic Delegate to Myanmar and Laos on 4 August 2012. On 8 February 2017, Tsang In-Nam presented the government of Myanmar with a proposal for the establishment of full diplomatic relations, and on 10 March the Myanmar Parliament gave its consent. On 12 August 2017, Tschang In-Nam's status was changed to Nuncio to Myanmar.

On 16 July 2022, Pope Francis appointed him Apostolic Nuncio to the Netherlands. On 13 February 2025, Pope Francis accepted his resignation in the basis of his age.

== See also ==
- List of heads of the diplomatic missions of the Holy See

Catholic Church titles
Preceded by Daniel Robert Jenky	— TITULAR — Titular Bishop of Amantia; 19 October 2002 – present	Incumbent
Diplomatic posts
Preceded by Edward Joseph Adams	Apostolic Nuncio to Bangladesh; 19 October 2002 – 27 August 2007	Succeeded by Joseph Marino
Preceded by Christophe Pierre	Apostolic Nuncio to Uganda; 27 August 2007 – 4 August 2012	Succeeded by Michael A. Blume
Preceded by Giovanni d'Aniello	Apostolic Nuncio to Myanmar; 4 August 2012 – 16 July 2022	Succeeded by vacant
Preceded by Giovanni d'Aniello	Apostolic Nuncio to Thailand; 4 August 2012 – 16 July 2022	Succeeded by Peter Bryan Wells
Preceded by Giovanni d'Aniello	Apostolic Nuncio to Cambodia; 4 August 2012 – 16 July 2022	Succeeded by Peter Bryan Wells
Preceded by Giovanni d'Aniello	Apostolic Delegate to Laos; 4 August 2012 – 16 July 2022	Succeeded by Peter Bryan Wells
Preceded by Aldo Cavalli	Apostolic Nuncio to the Netherlands; 16 July 2022 – 13 February 2025	Vacant
