= Avellino (disambiguation) =

Avellino is a town and comune, capital of the province of Avellino in the Campania region of southern Italy.

Avellino may also refer to:

- Province of Avellino, a province in the Campania region of Italy
- Avellino (surname)
- Air Avellino, a.k.a. S.S. Felice Scandone, Italian basketball club
- Avellino eruption, eruption of Mount Vesuvius in the 2nd millennium BC
- U.S. Avellino 1912, Italian football club
- Roman Catholic Diocese of Avellino, Italian Catholic diocese in Naples
