= Alberto Tricarico =

Italian prelate of the Catholic Church (1927–2024)

His Excellency, The Most Reverend Alberto Tricarico
- Apostolic Nuncio emeritus of the Office of Secretariat of State; Titular Archbishop of Sistroniana
- Appointed: 26 July 1993
- Retired: 2002
- Other post: Titular Archbishop of Sistroniana (1987–2024)
- Previous posts: Apostolic Delegate to Laos, Malaysia, Brunei (1987–1993) and Myanmar (1990–1993); Apostolic Pro-Nuncio to Singapore and Thailand (1987–1993)

Orders
- Ordination: 6 January 1950
- Consecration: 27 April 1987 by Agostino Casaroli, Salvatore Asta, and Manuel d'Almeida Trindade

Personal details
- Born: 10 August 1927 Gallipoli, Italy
- Died: 27 June 2024 (aged 96) Rome, Italy

Styles of Alberto Tricarico
- Reference style: His Excellency; The Most Reverend
- Spoken style: Your Excellency
- Religious style: Archbishop

Alberto Tricarico (10 August 1927 – 27 June 2024) was an Italian prelate of the Catholic Church who worked in the diplomatic service of the Holy See and in the Roman Curia.

== Biography ==
Alberto Tricarico was born in Gallipoli, Italy, on 10 August 1927. He was ordained a priest on 6 January 1950.

To prepare for a diplomatic career he entered the Pontifical Ecclesiastical Academy in 1953.

On 28 February 1987, Pope John Paul II named him a titular archbishop, Apostolic Pro-Nuncio to Singapore, Apostolic Pro-Nuncio to Thailand, Apostolic Delegate to Laos, and Apostolic Delegate to Malaysia and Brunei. He received his episcopal consecration from Cardinal Agostino Casaroli on 27 April 1987.

On 22 December 1990, Pope John Paul appointed him Apostolic Delegate to Myanmar in addition to his other responsibilities.

On 26 July 1993, Pope John Paul assigned him to a position in the Secretariat of State.

Tricarico retired in 2002, and died in Rome on 27 June 2024, at the age of 96.

== See also ==
- List of heads of the diplomatic missions of the Holy See

Catholic Church titles
Preceded by Josep Maria Guix Ferreres	Titular Archbishop of Sistroniana; 1987–2024	Vacant
