= Aiuti =

Aiuti is a surname. Notable people with the surname include:

- Andrea Aiuti (1849–1905), Italian Roman Catholic cardinal
- Costantino Aiuti (1876–1928), Italian prelate of the Catholic Church
- Fernando Aiuti (1935–2019), Italian immunologist and politician
