= Angelo Palmas =

Italian prelate

- Apostolic Pro-Nuncio to Canada
- Church: Catholic Church
- In office: 2 September 1975 – 10 March 1990
- Predecessor: Guido del Mestri
- Successor: Carlo Curis
- Other post: Titular Archbishop of Vibiana (1964-2003)
- Previous posts: Apostolic Nuncio to Colombia (1969-1975); Apostolic Delegate to Vietnam and Cambodia (1964-1969)

Orders
- Ordination: 15 August 1938 by Francesco d’Errico
- Consecration: 28 June 1964 by Pope Paul VI

Personal details
- Born: 21 December 1914 Villanova Monteleone, Province of Sassari, Kingdom of Italy
- Died: 9 June 2003 (aged 88) Rome, Italy

Angelo Palmas (21 December 1914 – 9 June 2003) was an Italian prelate of the Catholic Church who worked in the diplomatic service of the Holy See.

== Biography ==
Palmas was born in Villanova Monteleone, Italy, on 21 December 1914. He was ordained a priest on 5 August 1938.

To prepare for a diplomatic career he entered the Pontifical Ecclesiastical Academy in 1945.

On 17 June 1964, Pope Paul VI named him a titular archbishop and Apostolic Delegate to Vietnam and Cambodia. (Note: He was the first to hold the position. Pope Paul given the Delegation to Indochina its new name, the Delegation to Vietnam and Cambodia, on the day Palmas was named Delegate.) He received his episcopal consecration from Pope Paul on 28 June 1964.

On 19 April 1969, Pope Paul appointed him Apostolic Nuncio to Colombia.

On 3 September 1975, Pope Paul named him Apostolic Pro-Nuncio to Canada.

He retired when replaced in that post in March 1990.

Angelon Palmas died on 9 June 2003.
