= Apostolic Nunciature to Timor-Leste =

Diplomatic post of the Holy See

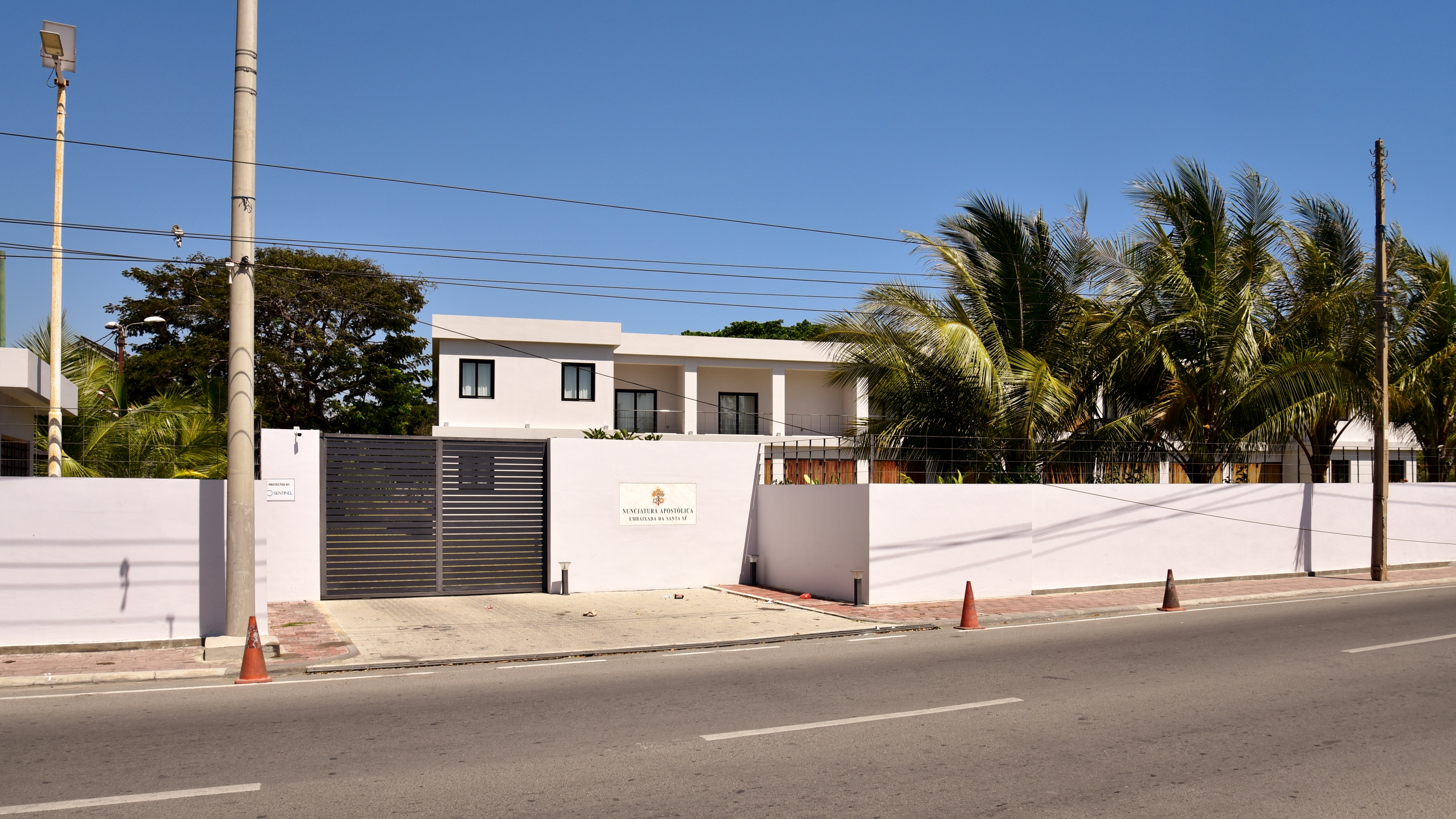
- Location: Dili
- Apostolic Nuncio: Archbishop Wojciech Załuski

The Apostolic Nunciature to Timor-Leste is an ecclesiastical office of the Catholic Church in Timor-Leste. It is a diplomatic post of the Holy See, whose representative is called the Apostolic Nuncio with the rank of an ambassador. The title Apostolic Nuncio to Timor-Leste is held by the prelate appointed Apostolic Nuncio to Malaysia. The nunciature maintains an office in Dili; the nuncio resides in Malaysia.

Pope Benedict XVI established the Nunciature to Timor-Leste on 24 June 2003.

== List of papal representatives to Timor-Leste ==
Apostolic Nuncios

- Renzo Fratini (24 June 2003 – 27 January 2004)
- Malcolm Ranjith (29 April 2004 – 10 December 2005)
- Leopoldo Girelli (10 October 2006 – 16 January 2013)
- Joseph Marino (16 January 2013 – 11 October 2019)
- Wojciech Załuski (29 September 2020 – 28 February 2026)

== See also ==
- Catholic Church in Timor-Leste
- Religion in Timor-Leste
