= Bangladesh–Holy See relations =

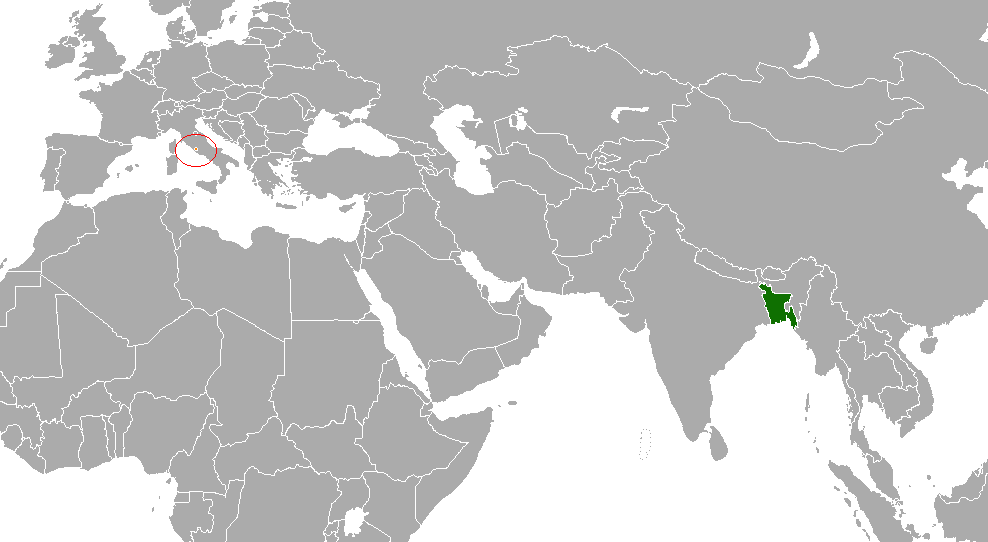

- Bangladesh: Holy See

Bangladesh–Holy See relations are foreign relations between Bangladesh and the Holy See. Bangladesh has an ambassador accredited to the Holy See (Md. Abdul Hannan, as of December 2009), while the Holy See has a nunciature in the Baridhara Diplomatic Enclave in Dhaka. Since July 2013, Archbishop George Kocherry has been the Apostolic Nuncio to Bangladesh.

Three popes have visited Bangladesh: Pope Paul VI in November 1970 (then East Pakistan), Pope John Paul II in November 1986, and Pope Francis in November 2017. Bangladeshi Prime Minister Sheikh Hasina Wajed has visited the Vatican.

== See also ==
- Foreign relations of Bangladesh
- Foreign relations of the Holy See
