= Diocese of Vibiana =

Roman Catholic titular see

The Diocese of Vibiana is a suppressed and titular see of the Roman Catholic Church in North Africa.

The current bishop is Eliseo Antonio Ariotti who was appointed 17 Jul 2003, and who replaced Angelo Palmas (1964-2003).
