= List of ambassadors of Malaysia to the Holy See =

Ambassador of Malaysia to the Holy See
- Incumbent; Hendy Assan since 28 September 2023
- Style: His Excellency
- Seat: Rome, Italy
- Appointer: Yang di-Pertuan Agong
- Inaugural holder: Bernard Giluk Dompok
- Formation: 9 June 2016
- Website: Official website

The ambassador of Malaysia to the Holy See is the head of Malaysia's diplomatic mission to the Holy See. The position has the rank and status of an ambassador extraordinary and plenipotentiary and is based in the Embassy of Malaysia, Holy See.

== List of heads of mission ==
=== Ambassadors to the Holy See ===
| Ambassador | Term start | Term end |
|---|---|---|
| Bernard Giluk Dompok | 9 June 2016 | 30 June 2018 |
| Westmoreland anak Edward Palon | 21 March 2019 | June 2023 |
| Hendy anak Assan | 28 September 2023 | Incumbent |

== See also ==
- Holy See–Malaysia relations
