= Apostolic Delegation to Brunei Darussalam =

Diplomatic post of the Holy See

The Apostolic Delegation to Brunei Darussalam is an ecclesiastical office of the Catholic Church in Brunei Darussalam. It is led by an Apostolic Delegate who serves as principal liaison with the Catholic hierarchy there. It is a quasi-diplomatic post in that it maintains contacts with government officials; the Holy See and Brunei Darussalam have no formal relationship.

The Holy See created its Delegation to Brunei in 1998 by dividing its Delegation to Malaysia and Brunei, which it had formed in 1986. (Note: The Delegation to Malaysia was raised to the rank of Nunciature to Malaysia on 27 July 2011.)

The position of Apostolic Delegate to Brunei Darussalam is held by the prelate who serves as Apostolic Nuncio to Malaysia, who resides in Kuala Lumpur, Malaysia.

== List of papal representatives to Brunei Darussalam ==
Apostolic Delegates

- Luigi Bressan (1998 (Note: Bressan was named Apostolic Delegate to Malaysia and Brunei on 26 July 1993. He became Delegate to Brunei when that delegation was divided in 1998.) - 25 March 1999)
- Adriano Bernardini (24 July 1999 - 26 April 2003)
- Salvatore Pennacchio (20 September 2003 - 8 May 2010)
- Leopoldo Girelli (13 January 2011 - 16 January 2013)
- Joseph Marino (16 January 2013 - 11 October 2019)
- Wojciech Załuski (29 September 2020 – 28 February 2026)

== See also ==
- Apostolic Nunciature to Malaysia
