= Apostolic Nunciature to Myanmar =

Diplomatic post of the Holy See

The Apostolic Nunciature to Myanmar is an ecclesiastical office of the Catholic Church in Myanmar. It is a diplomatic post of the Holy See, whose representative is called the Apostolic Nuncio with the rank of an ambassador. Since 2023, the Apostolic Nunciature to Myanmar has been independent from Thailand; it has its own Office/Residence in Yangon with a resident Chargé d'Affaires a.i. (Annuario Pontificio 2026, p. 1555).

Pope John Paul II established the Holy See's Delegation to Myanmar on 13 September 1990. It became a nunciature and the first nuncio was appointed on 12 August 2017.

== List of papal representatives to Myanmar ==
Apostolic Delegates

- Alberto Tricarico (22 December 1990 – 26 July 1993)
- Luigi Bressan (26 July 1993 - 25 March 1999)
- Adriano Bernardini (24 July 1999 - 26 April 2003)
- Salvatore Pennacchio (20 September 2003 - 8 May 2010)
- Giovanni d'Aniello (22 September 2010 - 10 February 2012)
- Paul Tschang In-Nam (4 August 2012 – 12 August 2017)

Apostolic Nuncios

- Paul Tschang In-Nam (12 August 2017 – 16 July 2022)
