= Apostolic Nunciature to Bangladesh =

Diplomatic post of the Holy See

- Location: Dhaka, Bangladesh
- Address: U.N. Road 2, Baridhara, Dhaka 1212.
- Coordinates: 23°47′45″N 90°25′15″E
- Apostolic Nuncio: Kevin Stuart Randall

The Apostolic Nunciature of the Holy See to Bangladesh is the diplomatic mission of the Holy See to Bangladesh, equivalent to an embassy. It is located at U.N. Road 2, Baridhara, Dhaka 1212. The position of Apostolic Nuncio is currently hold by Kevin Stuart Randall.

The Apostolic Nunciature to Bangladesh is an ecclesiastical office of the Catholic Church in Bangladesh, with the rank of ambassador. The nuncio serves both as the ambassador of the Pope (as head of state of Vatican City) to the President of Bangladesh, and as delegate and point-of-contact between the Catholic hierarchy in Bangladesh and the Pope (as head of the church).

The Holy See established the Apostolic Nunciature to Bangladesh on 2 March 1973.

== List of papal representatives ==
Apostolic Pro-Nuncios

- Edward Idris Cassidy (2 February 1973 (Note: Cassidy's appointment preceded the establishment of the nunciature by a month.) – 25 March 1979)

Apostolic Nuncios

- Luigi Accogli (6 July 1979 – 17 June 1988)
- Piero Biggio (10 December 1988 – 23 April 1992)
- Adriano Bernardini (20 August 1992 – 15 June 1996)
- Edward Joseph Adams (24 August 1996 – 22 August 2002)
- Paul Tschang In-Nam (19 October 2002 – 27 August 2007)
- Joseph Marino (12 January 2008 – 16 January 2013)
- George Kocherry (6 July 2013 – 24 August 2022)
- Kevin Stuart Randall (13 August 2023 – present)

== See also ==
- Apostolic Nunciature to Pakistan
- Bangladesh–Holy See relations
- List of diplomatic missions of the Holy See
