= Niccolò Cartissani =

Italian painter

Niccolò Cartissani (1670 – 1742) was an Italian painter, mainly of landscape subjects, during the late-Baroque.

== Biography ==
He was born in Messina, Kingdom of Sicily. He died in Rome, Papal States. He is described as the best landscape painter of his day from Sicily after Giulio Avellino.
