= Papal Representative to Vietnam =

Diplomatic service of the Holy See in Southeast Asia

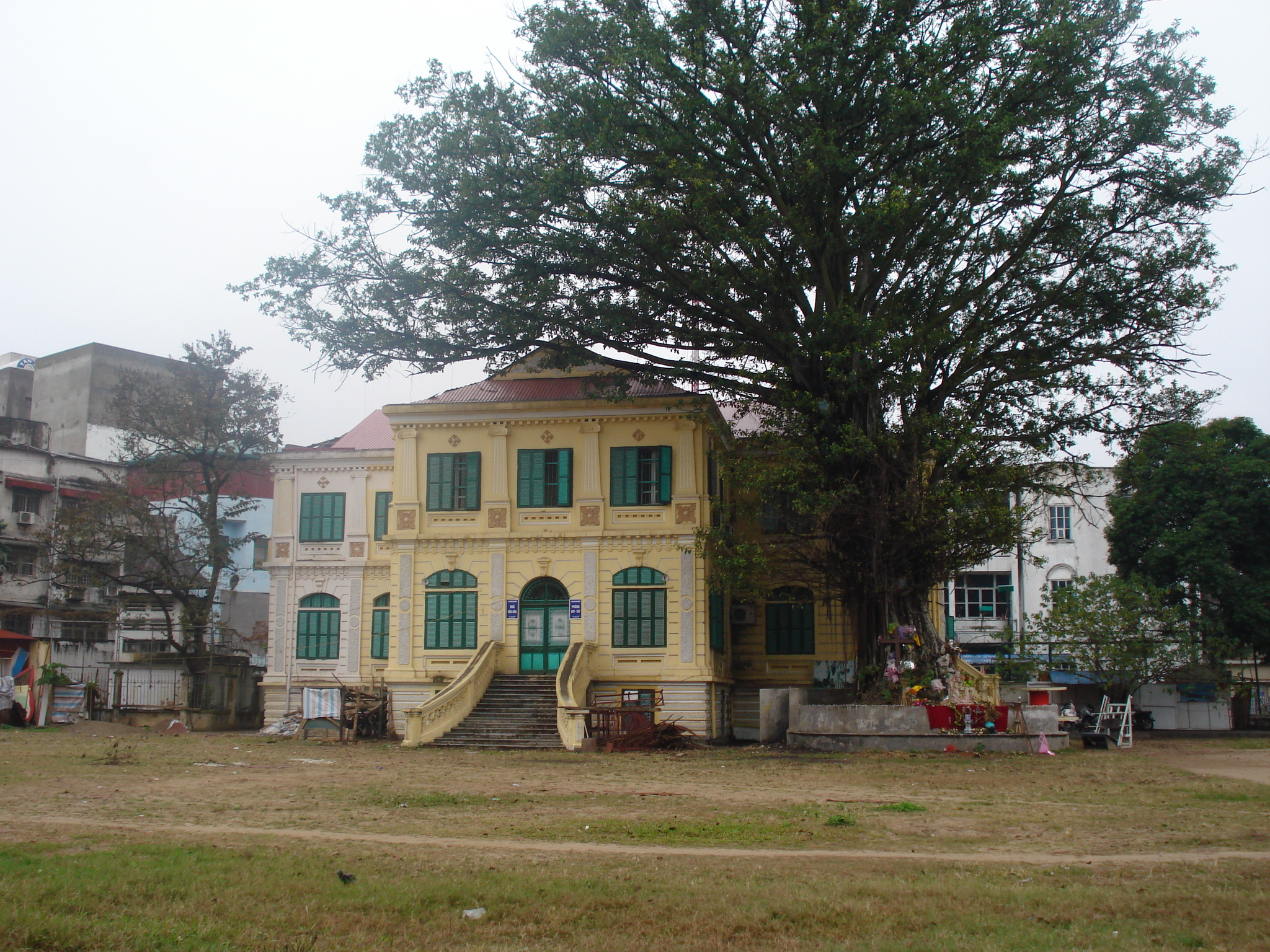

The Papal Representative to Vietnam is an official of the diplomatic service of the Holy See responsible for articulating and defending the interests of the Holy See to officials of the Catholic Church, civil society, and government offices in Vietnam. The Holy See and the government of Vietnam have not established diplomatic relations and the position of Papal Representative to Vietnam is not a diplomatic one, though he is a member of the diplomatic service of the Holy See and the government of Vietnam agreed to the creation of the position in 2011. Since then, the Papal Representative to Vietnam has also held the title Apostolic Nuncio to Singapore and resided there.

The Holy See managed its affairs in Vietnam through a Delegation to Indochina established on 20 May 1925. Pope John XXIII changed its name to the Delegation to Vietnam and Cambodia on 17 June 1964. Such relations as existed between the Holy See and the government ended with the formation of the Socialist Republic of Vietnam in 1976. More than thirty years later, as the parties negotiated a new relationship, Pope Benedict XVI met with Vietnamese Prime Minister Nguyen Tan Dung in 2007 and with Vietnamese President Nguyen Minh Triet in 2009. In agreeing in 2011 to the appointment of a Papal Representative to Vietnam, the government retained the right to approve the appointee, as is customary for diplomatic appointments, and to approve the Representative's working visits to Vietnam.

On 23 December 2023, Pope Francis named Archbishop Zalewski, Resident Papal Representative in Vietnam.

== Papal representatives to Vietnam ==
Delegate to Indochina

- Costantino Aiuti (28 May 1925 – 29 July 1928)
- Victor Colomban Dreyer (24 November 1928 – November 1936)
- Antonin-Fernand Drapier (28 November 1936 – April 1950)
- John Jarlath Dooley (18 October 1951 – September 1959)
- Mario Brini (12 September 1959 – 13 June 1962)
- Salvatore Asta (13 October 1962 – 23 March 1964)

Apostolic Delegate to Vietnam and Cambodia

- Angelo Palmas (17 June 1964 – 19 April 1969)
- Henri Lemaître (30 May 1969 – 19 December 1975)

Pontifical Representative to Vietnam

- Leopoldo Girelli (non-resident: 13 January 2011 – 13 September 2017)
- Marek Zalewski (non-resident from 21 May 2018, resident from 23 December 2023 to present)
