= San Francesco di Paola ai Monti =

- Church of Francis of Paola in Monti
- Chiesa di San Francesco di Paola
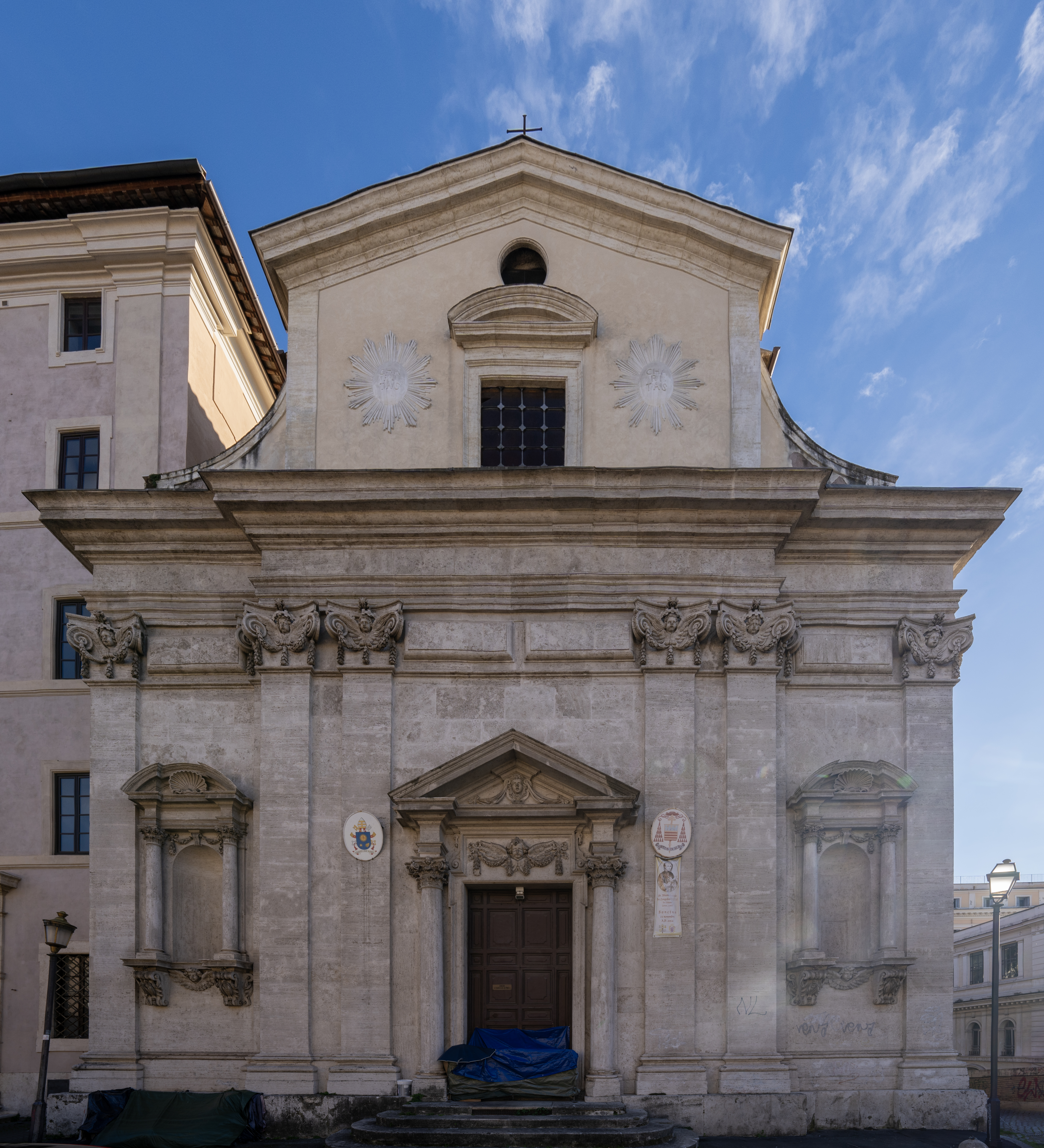
- San Francesco di Paola ai Monti
- Click on the map for a fullscreen view
- 41°53′37.7″N 12°29′29.2″E
- Location: Piazza di S. Francesco di Paola 10, Rome
- Country: Italy
- Language: Italian
- Denomination: Catholic
- Tradition: Roman Rite
- Religious order: Minim Friars

History
- Status: Titular church, Regional church, General Curia of the Order of Minims
- Founder: Giovanni Pizzullo della Regina
- Dedication: Francis of Paola

Architecture
- Architect: Orazio Torriani
- Architectural type: Baroque
- Groundbreaking: 1624
- Completed: 1630

Administration
- Diocese: Rome

San Francesco da Paola ai Monti is an 18th-century titular church in Rome. It is dedicated to St Francis of Paola, the founder of the Order of Minims, whose friars serve this church and whose Generalate is attached to it, and is located in the Monti rione.

== History ==
It was built in 1645–50 with funds given by Olimpia Aldobrandini Pamphili, who (like St Francis) had roots in Calabria. It was designed by Giovanni Pietro Morandi, given to the Minim Friars, and became the national church of the Calabrians. The monastery was refurbished under Father Francesco Zavaroni di Montalto, General of the order, and using as an architect Luigi Berettoni.

The late Baroque high altar was made by Giovanni Antonio de Rossi c. 1655 (who is also credited with the church's wooden tabernacle, set into a sculptured entrance of a military pavilion). No new bell tower was built for the church - instead the 12th century Torre dei Margani was used, preserving its medieval coat-of-arms on the tower has been preserved.

However, the church as a whole was not consecrated until 10 July 1728, by Pope Benedict XIII. The lower part of the façade was refinished in plaster in the 18th century, and the whole church was then restored in 1826 by Pope Leo XII.

The recent titular cardinal-deacon of the church, from 21 October 2003 until his death was Renato Martino.

== Chapels ==
The church contains an icon of Francis said to be a copy of a portrait, along with scenes from the life and miracles of the saint which can be seen in the sacristy and examples by Giuseppe Bartolomeo Chiari in the second chapel on the south side.

The ceiling of the sacristy was painted by Sassoferrato, with a motif of "The Blessed Virgin appearing to St Francis of Paola". On the side wall is a Crucifixion and St Francis of Paola by Francesco Cozza.

By the door to the presbytery are the tombs of Lazzaro Pallavicini and Giovanni Pizzullo, both with busts by Agostino Corsini.

- South side chapels (right as you enter)
1. 1st: Altarpiece of Saint Anne, Joachim and the Madonna by Filippo Luzi and ceiling frescoes by Onofrio Avellino.
2. 2nd: Altarpiece of St Francis of Assisi
3. 3rd: Altarpiece of Sts Francis of Paola and Francis of Sales, patrons of the Order, painted by Antonio Crecolini.
- North side chapels
1. 1st chapel: Altarpiece by Stefano Pozzo and ceilings frescoed by Onofrio Avellino
2. 2nd chapel: Altarpiece of Immaculate Conception by Stefano Pozzo
3. 3rd chapel: painting of St Michael the Archangel by Giacomo Triga and relics of Blessed Nicola of Langobardi in a porphyry urn.

== Cardinal-deacons ==
- Alexandre Renard (1967–1976)
- Joseph-Marie Trịnh Như Khuê (1976–1978)
- Pietro Pavan (1985–1994)
- Renato Martino (2003–2024)
