= Ten Commandments for Drivers =

On June 19, 2007, the Vatican, under the direction of Pope Benedict XVI and Cardinal Renato Martino, issued a 36-page document entitled Guidelines for the Pastoral Care of the Road, created by the curial Pontifical Council for Migrants and Itinerant People, under the leadership of Renato Raffaele Cardinal Martino, and intended for bishop conferences around the world. The document specifically states that it is aimed at bishops, priests, religious and other pastoral workers in hopes of pastoral caregivers paying greater attention to expressions of human mobility. The document derived some of its material from the Old Testament, the New Testament, the American Automobile Association, and statements by Popes Pius XII, John XXIII, Paul VI and John Paul II.

On its issue this document received a lot of media attention due to its listing of Ten Commandments for Drivers. In essence, the Vatican is pointing out that the act of driving has a moral and ethical component. The Guidelines make note of both the benefits of the use of automobiles as well as its dangerous and negative consequences. The problem is not as pervasive in the Vatican City itself, which has a speed limit of 30 km/h (18-19 mph) and approximately only 1000 cars; but there were over 35 million deaths resulting from car accidents in the 20th century, and the Vatican is responding. In the same section of the document as the Drivers' Ten Commandments are the so-called Christian virtues of drivers, which include prudence, justice and hope.

The Guidelines not only deal with problems on the road, but also address prostitution, caring for street children and the homeless, found in Parts Two, Three and Four of the Guidelines.

The Guidelines state that driving can bring out primitive behavior in drivers, which leads to road rage, rude gestures, speeding, drinking behind the wheel, cursing, blasphemy, impoliteness, and intentional violation of the highway code. The Guidelines encourage drivers to obey the highway code, pray behind the wheel and recite the rosary, which the Guidelines insist would not distract the driver's attention.

== List 10 of Commandments for drivers ==
The following are the ten commandments for drivers.

1. You shall not kill.
2. The road shall be for you a means of communion between people and not of mortal harm.
3. Courtesy, uprightness and prudence will help you deal with unforeseen events.
4. Be charitable and help your neighbor in need, especially victims of accidents.
5. Cars shall not be for you an expression of power and domination, and an occasion of sin.
6. Charitably convince the young and not so young not to drive when they are not in a fitting condition to do so.
7. Support the families of accident victims.
8. Bring guilty motorists and their victims together, at the appropriate time, so that they can undergo the liberating experience of forgiveness.
9. On the road, protect the more vulnerable party.
10. Feel responsible towards others.
