= John Jarlath Dooley =

Irish prelate of the Catholic Church

His Excellency, The Most Reverend John Jarlath Dooley S.S.C.
- Apostolic Delegate to Indochina
- Appointed: 18 October 1951
- Term ended: August 1959
- Predecessor: Antonin Drapier
- Successor: Mario Brini
- Other posts: Titular Archbishop of Macra (1951–1997); Official of the Secretariat of State (1961–1966)
- Previous posts: Procurator General of the Missionary Society of St. Columban (1936–1950); Regent of the Apostolic Delegation to Indochina (1950–1951)

Orders
- Ordination: 20 December 1931 by Joseph Rummel
- Consecration: 21 December 1951 by Egidio Vagnozzi as Principal consecrator, Ngô Đình Thục and Jean-Baptiste-Maximilien Chabalier as Principal co-consecrators

Personal details
- Born: John Jarlath Dooley; 6 July 1906 Kilmaine, Co Mayo, Ireland
- Died: 18 September 1997 (aged 91)

John Jarlath Dooley (6 July 1906 – 18 September 1997) was an Irish prelate of the Catholic Church who worked in the diplomatic service of the Holy See and in the Roman Curia.

== Biography ==
John Jarlath Dooley was born in Kilmaine, Ireland, on 6 July 1906. He was ordained a priest of the Missionary Society of St. Columban on 20 December 1931. He was appointed Procurator General of the Columbans in 1936.

In 1950, Dooley was assigned as Regent of the Apostolic Delegation to Indochina. On 18 October 1951, Pope Pius XII named him a titular archbishop and Apostolic Delegate to Indochina. He received his episcopal consecration from Archbishop Egidio Vagnozzi on 21 December 1951. Taking on the role during the hardships of the First Indochina War, his area covered four countries: Vietnam, Cambodia, Laos, and Thailand. He moved the office of the Apostolic Delegation from Hue to Hanoi, onto the property of the Episcopal See of Hanoi.

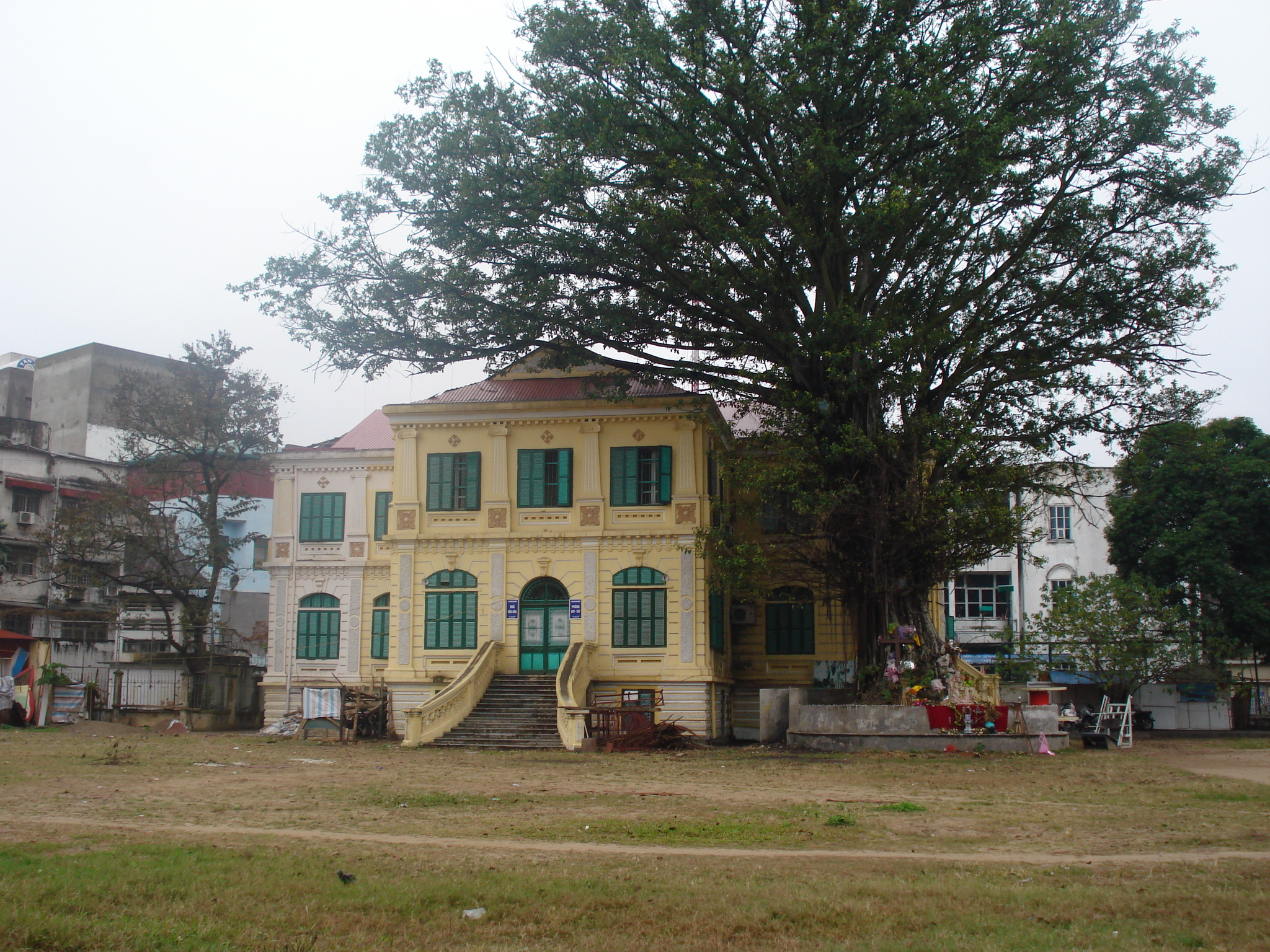
The building of the Apostolic Delegation in Hanoi, photo in 2008

As the Geneva Accords between France and the Viet Minh divided Vietnam in 1954, he remained in Hanoi along with his secretaries, Terence O'Driscoll, S.S.C., and Dieudonné Bourguignon, S.A.M. They were confined to the city of Hanoi, and the tension with the government led to Dooley's illness.

Dooley was evacuated by air from North Vietnam for medical treatment in early August 1959, three weeks before his secretary O'Driscoll was expelled by the government and the Delegation in Hanoi was closed permanently. Dooley returned to Rome in mid-September.

In 1961, he was assigned to the Secretariat of State and later took part in the Second Vatican Council.

Dooley retired to Dalgan Park, Co Meath, Ireland. He died on 18 September 1997.
