= Henri Lemaître =

Henri Lemaître (1921 – 2003) was a Belgian prelate of the Catholic Church who spent his career in the diplomatic service of the Holy See.

== Biography ==
Henri Lemaître was born on 17 October 1921 in Mortsel, Belgium. He studied at the Major Seminary, Mechelen, and was ordained a priest on 28 July 1946.

He completed the course of studies at the Pontifical Ecclesiastical Academy in 1946 and then entered the diplomatic service of the Holy See.

On 30 May 1969, Pope Paul VI named him Titular Archbishop of Tongeren and Apostolic Delegate to Cambodia and Vietnam. He received his episcopal consecration on 20 July from Cardinal Leo Joseph Suenens, Archbishop of Mechelen. In Vietnam in the early 1970s, he assessed U.S. prospects for a military victory as unlikely based on his Catholic information sources. He was forced to leave the country upon the collapse of the American war effort in 1975.

On 19 December 1975 he was appointed Apostolic Nuncio to Uganda, where he served during the reign of Idi Amin and the Uganda–Tanzania War that ousted him. He resigned on 16 November 1981.

On 31 October 1985, Pope John Paul II named him Apostolic Pro-Nuncio to Scandinavia with responsibility for Denmark, Finland, Iceland, Norway and Sweden.

On 28 March 1992 he was appointed Apostolic Nuncio to the Netherlands. He retired on 8 February 1997 upon the appointment of Angelo Acerbi as his successor in the Netherlands.

He died in Rome on 20 April 2003. He was buried in Wilrijk Steytelinck Communal Cemetery in Antwerp.
