= Victor Dreyer =

French Catholic priest (1866–1944)

Colomban Dreyer O.F.M.
- Apostolic Delegate to Indochina
- Church: Catholic Church
- See: Apostolic Delegation to Indochina
- In office: 24 November 1928 – 19 November 1936
- Predecessor: Costantino Aiuti
- Successor: Antonin Drapier
- Other post: Titular Archbishop of Adulis (1928-1944)
- Previous posts: Vicar Apostolic of the Suez Canal (1927-1928); Titular Bishop of Orthosias in Phoenicia (1923-1928); Vicar Apostolic of Rabat (1923-1927)

Orders
- Ordination: 25 July 1889
- Consecration: 16 August 1923 by Louis-Ernest Dubois

Personal details
- Born: Victor Valentin Dreyer; 15 February 1866 Rosheim, Bas-Rhin, French Empire
- Died: 7 May 1944 (aged 78) Vigny, French State

Victor Valentin Dreyer (15 February 1866 – 7 May 1944), known in religious life as Colomban Dreyer, was a French prelate of the Catholic Church who worked as a missionary bishop in North Africa and in the diplomatic service of the Holy See as the Apostolic Delegate to Indochina.

== Biography ==
Victor Valentin Dreyer was born in Rosheim, on 15 February 1866. He attended the seminary in Saint-Dié-des-Vosges and then joined the Order of Friars Minor, taking the name Marie Colomban. He was ordained a priest on 25 July 1889.

He held several posts within his order, including assignments in Canada, Rome, and the Holy Land.

On 27 June 1923, Pope Pius XI named him a titular bishop and the first Apostolic Vicar of the Rabat, Morocco. He received his episcopal consecration from Cardinal Louis-Ernest Dubois, Archbishop of Paris, on 16 August 1923.

On 11 March 1927, Pope Pius named him the first Apostolic Vicar of Suez Canal.

On 24 November 1928, Pope Pius named him Apostolic Delegate to Indochina and on 26 November a titular archbishop. He retired in 1936 upon the appointment of his successor in that position.

Dreyer died on 7 May 1944 in Vigny, Val-d'Oise.
