= Kevin Stuart Randall =

His Excellency, The Most Reverend Kevin Stuart Randall
- Apostolic Nuncio to Bangladesh; Titular Archbishop of Glenndálocha
- Appointed: August 13, 2023
- Predecessor: George Kocherry
- Other post: Titular Archbishop of Glenndálocha

Orders
- Ordination: July 25, 1992 by Daniel Patrick Reilly
- Consecration: November 4, 2023 by Christophe Pierre, Timothy Broglio, and Lawrence Eugene Brandt

Personal details
- Born: May 6, 1966 (age 60) New London, Connecticut, US
- Motto: Sub umbra crucis (Under the shadow of the cross)

Styles of Kevin Stuart Randall
- Reference style: His Excellency; The Most Reverend
- Spoken style: Your Excellency
- Religious style: Archbishop

Kevin Stuart Randall (born May 6, 1966) is an American prelate of the Catholic Church who works in the diplomatic service of the Holy See.

== Early life ==
Kevin Randall was born in New London, Connecticut, on May 6, 1966. He was ordained into the priesthood on July 25, 1992 for the Diocese of Norwich by Bishop Daniel Patrick Reilly at the Cathedral of Saint Patrick in Norwich, Connecticut.

== Diplomatic career ==
Randall entered the diplomatic service of the Holy See on July 1, 2001, and worked in the apostolic nunciatures in Rwanda, Serbia, Slovenia, Peru, South Africa, Mexico and Austria.

On August 13, 2023, Pope Francis appointed Randall as titular archbishop of Glenndálocha and apostolic nuncio to Bangladesh. On November 4, 2023, Randall was consecrated as an archbishop at the Cathedral of Saint Patrick by Cardinal Christophe Pierre.

== See also ==
- List of heads of the diplomatic missions of the Holy See
