= Onofrio Avellino =

Italian painter

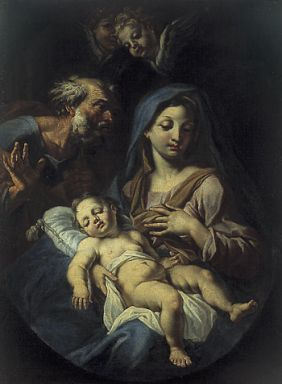
The Holy Family

Onofrio Avellino (c. 1674 – 17 April 1741) was an Italian painter of the Baroque period.

== Biography ==
Born in Naples, Giulio died in Ferrara or Rome, where he painted for the last twenty years of his life. He initially trained under Luca Giordano. His adherence to the pictorial manner of the master was such that some of his copies of Jordanian compositions (battles, above all) were sold as original works of the same Giordano. But in 1692, when the former left to work in Madrid, he entered the studio of the Neapolitan Francesco Solimena. He painted a Virgin and Child, with Angels and Saints in Glory for the church of the Carmelites in Sorrento. For a church of Vico, he painted a canvas of St Ciro and Giovanni and the Virgin. He painted two canvases, one of a Miracle of St Dominic and the Apparition of the Virgin to the Shepherdess, for the church of Rosariello delle Pigne, outside of the Porta di Gennaro. He also made copies of Giordano and Solimena for export.

Towards the end of the second decade of the eighteenth century, he moved to Rome, though he maintained close contacts with the Neapolitan artistic environment. Of the long activity in Rome, which he mainly dedicated to portraiture, one should pay attention to The Glory of St. Anna in the ceiling of the church of St. Francesco da Paola, a St. Joseph in the same church and a St. Albert Caring for the Sick in St. Maria di Montesanto. Only the first of these works has come to the present day, having lost the others in an indeterminable period.

His elder sibling was, reputedly, Giulio Giacinto Avellino, also a painter, born in 1645. By 1718, he had transferred to Rome, where he was influenced by Carlo Maratta. The frescoes on the vault of San Francesco di Paola ai Monti in Rome are by Onofrio. He painted an altarpiece on the San Alberto heals the sick for the church of Santa Maria in Montesanto.

== Sources ==
- De Dominici, Bernardo (1846). Vite dei Pittori, Scultori, ed Architetti Napoletani, Tomo Quarto (Volume 4). Naples: Dalla Tipografia Trani.
- Rose, Reverend Hugh James (1857). A New General Biographical Dictionary (Volume II). London: B. Fellowes. p. 387.
