= Renato Martino =

Italian Roman Catholic cardinal (1932–2024)

His Eminence Renato Raffaele Martino
- Protodeacon of the College of Cardinals
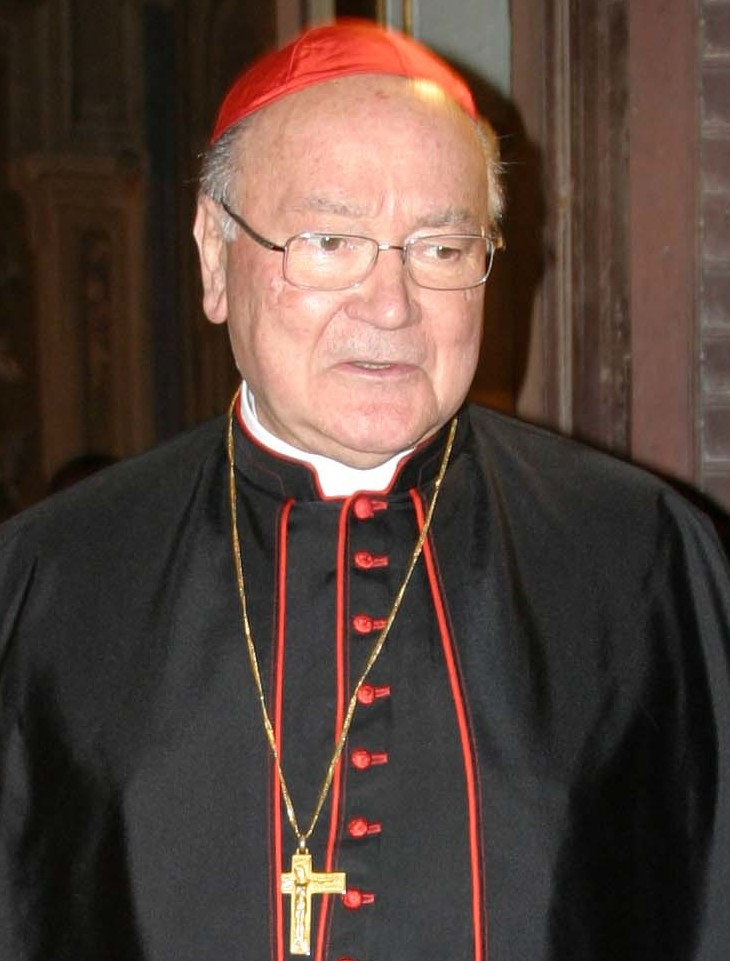
- Martino in 2011
- Church: Roman Catholic Church
- Appointed: 12 June 2014
- Predecessor: Jean-Louis Tauran
- Other post: Cardinal-Deacon of S. Francesco di Paola ai Monti
- Previous posts: Titular Archbishop of Segermes (1980–2003); Apostolic Pro-Nuncio to Thailand (1980–1986); Apostolic Pro-Nuncio to Singapore (1980–1986); Apostolic Delegate to Laos (1980–1986); Apostolic Delegate to Malaysia (1980–1986); Apostolic Delegate to Brunei Darussalam (1983–1986); Official to United Nations (1986–2002); President of the Pontifical Council for Justice and Peace (2002–2009); President of the Pontifical Council for Pastoral Care of Migrants and Itinerant People (2006–2009)

Orders
- Ordination: 20 June 1957 by Demetrio Moscato
- Consecration: 14 December 1980 by Agostino Casaroli
- Created cardinal: 21 October 2003 by Pope John Paul II
- Rank: Cardinal-Deacon

Personal details
- Born: Renato Raffaele Martino; 23 November 1932 Salerno, Italy
- Died: 28 October 2024 (aged 91) Rome, Italy
- Denomination: Roman Catholic
- Education: Pontifical Gregorian University, Pontifical Ecclesiastical Academy
- Motto: Virtus ex Alto ("Power from on high")
- Coat of arms

Styles of Renato Martino
- Reference style: His Eminence
- Spoken style: Your Eminence
- Informal style: Cardinal
- See: Segerme (titular)

Renato Raffaele Martino (23 November 1932 – 28 October 2024) was an Italian prelate of the Roman Catholic Church. Created a cardinal in 2003, Martino became the longest serving cardinal deacon, the cardinal protodeacon, from June 2014. He served for more than twenty years in the diplomatic service of the Holy See, including sixteen years as Permanent Observer of the Holy See to the United Nations. He held positions in the Roman Curia from 2002 to 2009.

== Early life ==
Born in Salerno, Martino was ordained as a priest in 1957. He held a doctorate in Canon law and was fluent in Italian, English, French, Spanish, and Portuguese.

To prepare for a diplomatic career, he entered the Pontifical Ecclesiastical Academy in 1960. He entered the diplomatic service of the Holy See in 1962, serving in Nicaragua, the Philippines, Lebanon, Canada, and Brazil.

== Apostolic Nuncio ==
While serving at the Apostolic Nunciature in Brazil, Martino was named Apostolic Pro-Nuncio to Thailand on 14 September 1980, and also Apostolic Delegate to Singapore, Malaysia, Laos, and Brunei Darussalam, and Titular Archbishop of Segerme.

On 3 December 1986, he was appointed Permanent Observer of the Holy See to the United Nations. He was in that post during the United States invasion of Panama, when president Manuel Noriega took refuge at the Vatican embassy.

In 1991, he opposed the American-led invasion of Iraq and was later critical of state sanctions against Iraq. In 1992, he participated in the UN Conference for the environment in Rio de Janeiro, speaking about the "centrality of the human person".

In June 1994, Martino demanded at the UN that a "safe haven" be created for Tutsi refugees in Rwanda in order to save over 30,000 lives in Kabgayi.

In September 1994, he was the official spokesman for the Holy See at the International Conference on Population and Development.

Martino was Pope John Paul II's official representative at the 1994 International Conference on Population and Development, and he had the task of defending the Church's anti-abortion teachings before a European-American bloc that strongly supported access to abortion. Martino was able to find support from Latin-American and Arab countries that were anti-abortion, and the Cairo conference was ultimately inconclusive.

Later in 1995, he participated in the World Conference on Women in Beijing, echoing John Paul's positions in his Letter to Women. He was on a diplomatic mission to the Ivory Coast to settle disputes there.

== Roman Curia ==
On 1 October 2002, Martino was named President of the Pontifical Council for Justice and Peace.

In November 2003, he championed the use of genetically modified organisms (GMOs) to alleviate world hunger at a conference that he organized to consider the morality of GMOs, which troubled critics concerned about the risks they pose to the environment and health.

Martino was elevated to the College of Cardinals in the consistory of 21 October 2003, becoming cardinal deacon of S. Francesco di Paola ai Monti. Martino was one of the cardinal electors who participated in the 2005 papal conclave that elected Pope Benedict XVI.

In December 2003, reacting to U.S. treatment of Saddam Hussein, including the release of a video showing his teeth being inspected "like a cow", he said: "I felt pity to see this man destroyed. Seeing him like this, a man in his tragedy, despite all the heavy blame he bears, I had a sense of compassion for him." On 6 November 2006, after Hussein had been sentenced to death, Martino said that "... punishing a crime with another crime – which is what killing for vengeance is – would mean that we are still at the point of demanding an eye for an eye, a tooth for a tooth..." He pleaded for clemency for Hussein and called for a peace conference aimed at solving all the major conflicts in the Middle East and reiterated his position that the invasion of Iraq by U.S.-led coalition was wrong.

Martino was named President of the Pontifical Council for the Pastoral Care of Migrants and Itinerants on 11 March 2006.

In November 2006, Martino called plans by the George W. Bush administration to construct an additional 700 miles of fencing along the U.S.-Mexico border "an inhumane program". He also said that Muslims in Europe should respect local laws restricting the wearing of certain types of veils. He said: "It seems elementary to me and it is quite right that the authorities demand it." He said they "must respect the traditions, symbols, culture and religion of the countries they move to".

On 14 June 2007, Martino urged Catholics to withhold donations from Amnesty International after the organization decided in April to advocate support for access to abortion in cases where pregnancy threatened a woman's life or was the result of rape or incest.

Speaking on the 2008–2009 Israel–Gaza conflict Cardinal Martino said that "Defenseless populations are always the ones who pay. Look at the conditions in Gaza: more and more, it resembles a big concentration camp." He called for peace talks: "If they can't come to an agreement, then someone else should do it (for them). The world cannot sit back and watch without doing anything. We Christians are not the only ones to call this land 'holy', Jews and Muslims do so too. The fact that this land is the scene of bloodshed seems a great tragedy." When the Israeli Foreign Ministry objected to the use of the phrase concentration camp, Vatican officials distanced themselves from Martino's remarks. Elaborating on his remarks, he said: "I say that the conditions people are living in there should be looked at: surrounded by a wall that is difficult to cross, in conditions contrary to human dignity. What is happening during these days is horrible. But when I speak, may people take into account the whole of what I say." He said both sides are "guilty" and that it is "necessary to separate them, like two fighting siblings" and make them "sit down to negotiate".

Martino took a great interest in automobiles and proclaimed the Ten Commandments for Drivers. He collaborated with the Fédération Internationale de l'Automobile.

=== Retirement ===
Martino submitted his resignation as required when he reached the age of 75. On 28 February 2009, Pope Benedict XVI relieved Martino of the presidency of the Pontifical Council for Pastoral Care of Migrants and Itinerant Peoples, appointing Archbishop Antonio Maria Vegliò to succeed him. On 24 October 2009, Pope Benedict named Cardinal Peter Turkson to succeed Martino as president of the Pontifical Council for Justice and Peace.

In July 2010, Martino assumed the position of Honorary President of the Dignitatis Humanae Institute, a Rome-based organisation established to promote human dignity "based on the recognition that man is made in the image and likeness of God". He resigned in 2019.

In November 2010, Martino was appointed by Prince Carlo, Duke of Castro as Grand Prior of the Sacred Military Constantinian Order of Saint George. On 25 June 2012, Prince Carlo, Duke of Castro appointed him Knight of the Illustrious Royal Order of Saint Januarius.

On 8 October 2011, he was named special papal envoy to the celebration of the centenary of the cathedral of Yangon, Burma, scheduled for 8 December 2011. Martino met with Nobel peace laureate Aung San Suu Kyi, a Buddhist, before the Mass.

Though too old to participate in the 2013 conclave that elected Pope Francis, Martino was one of the six cardinals who made the public act of obedience on behalf of the College of Cardinals to the new pope at his papal inauguration. (Note: Cardinals Giovanni Battista Re and Tarcisio Bertone represented the cardinal-bishops; Cardinals Joachim Meisner and Jozef Tomko represented the cardinal-priests; Cardinals Francesco Marchisano and Martino represented the cardinal-deacons.)

On 12 June 2014, Martino became the longest-serving cardinal deacon following the elevation of Cardinal Jean-Louis Tauran to the rank of Cardinal-Priest. Martino had declined to exercise his option of taking the title of cardinal priest after ten years as a cardinal deacon.

In letters dated 21 July 2017, the Governor-General of Antigua and Barbuda issued a notice that Martino's 2014 appointment to the Order of the Nation had been annulled.

Martino died in Rome on 28 October 2024, at the age of 91.

== Notes ==
Diplomatic posts
Preceded by Silvio Luoni	Apostolic Pro-Nuncio to Thailand and to Singapore, Apostolic Delegate to Laos and to Malaysia; 14 September 1980 – 3 December 1986	Succeeded by Alberto Tricarico
Preceded by First	Apostolic Delegate to Brunei Darussalam; 7 December 1983 – 3 December 1986	Succeeded by Adriano Bernardini
Preceded by Giovanni Cheli	Permanent Observer of the Holy See to the United Nations; 3 December 1986 – 1 October 2002	Succeeded by Celestino Migliore
Catholic Church titles
Preceded by Nguyen Van Thuan	President of the Pontifical Council for Justice and Peace; 1 October 2002 – 24 October 2009	Succeeded by Peter Turkson
Preceded by Pietro Pavan	Cardinal-Deacon of San Francesco di Paola ai Monti; 21 October 2003 – 28 October 2024	Succeeded by Vacant
Preceded by Stephen Fumio Hamao	President of the Pontifical Council for Pastoral Care of Migrants and Itinerant Peoples; 11 March 2006 – 28 February 2009	Succeeded by Antonio Maria Vegliò
Preceded by Jean-Louis Tauran	Cardinal Protodeacon; 12 June 2014 – 28 October 2024	Succeeded by Dominique Mamberti
