= Giulio Giacinto Avellino =

Italian painter

Giulio Giacinto Avellino (c. 1645 – c. 1700) was an Italian painter of the Baroque period.

He was born in Messina, and thus is known also as il Messinese. Giulio died in Ferrara, where he mainly painted. He trained with Salvator Rosa, and painted landscapes with ruins and mythic figures in his master's style. His sibling, Onofrio Avellino (c. 1674–1741), was also a painter. Niccolò Cartissani is described as also a contemporary landscape painter from Messina.
