= Wojciech Załuski =

Polish prelate of the Catholic Church (born 1960)

His Excellency, The Most Reverend Wojciech Załuski
- Apostolic Nuncio to Malta and Libya; Titular Archbishop of Diocletiana
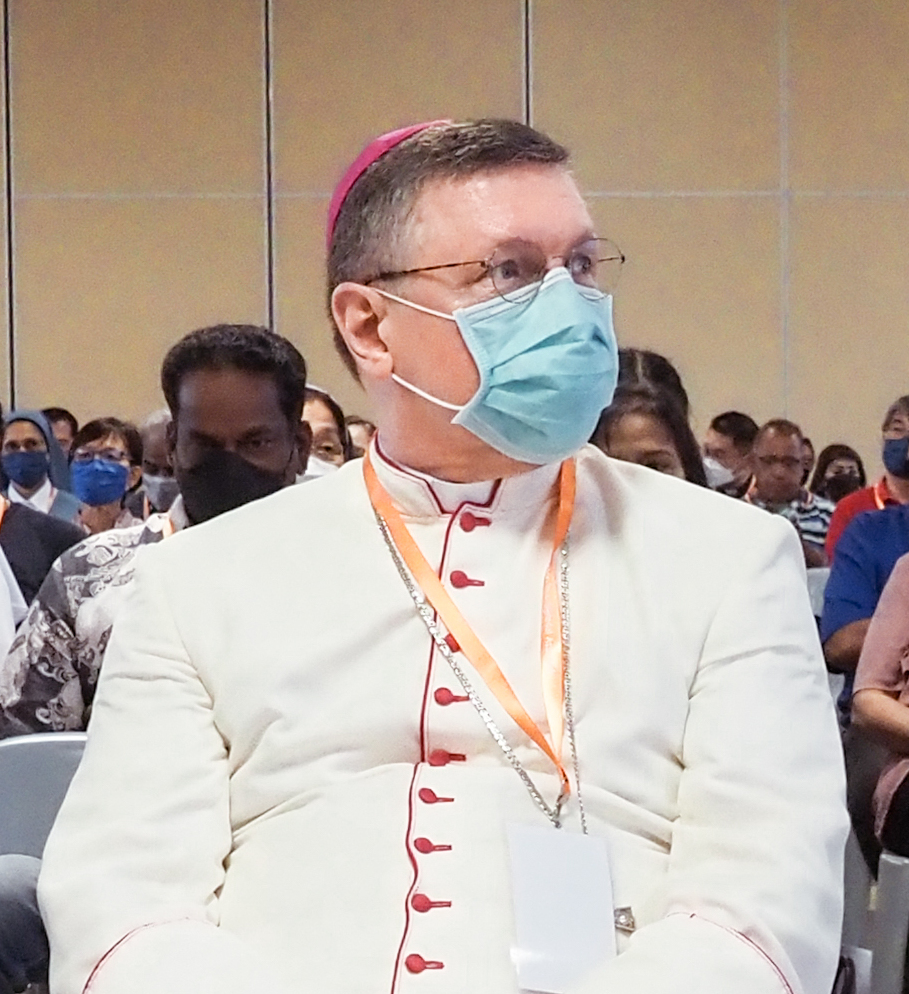
- Archbishop Załuski in 2022
- Church: Catholic Church
- Appointed: 28 February 2026
- Predecessor: Savio Hon
- Other post: Titular Archbishop of Diocletiana
- Previous posts: Apostolic Nuncio to Malaysia and Timor-Leste and Apostolic Delegate to Brunei (2020-2026); Apostolic Nuncio to Burundi (2014-2020)

Orders
- Ordination: 1 June 1985 by Bishop Juliusz Paetz
- Consecration: 9 August 2014 by Cardinal Pietro Parolin

Personal details
- Born: 5 April 1960 (age 66) Załuski-Lipniewo, Poland
- Motto: Soli Deo

Styles of Wojciech Załuski
- Reference style: His Excellency; The Most Reverend
- Spoken style: Your Excellency
- Religious style: Archbishop

Wojciech Załuski (born 5 April 1960) is a Polish prelate of the Catholic Church who has worked in the diplomatic service of the Holy See since 1985. He has been an apostolic nuncio and an archbishop since 2014.

== Biography ==
He was born in Załuski-Lipniewo, in the centre-east of Poland, on 5 April 1960. He earned a degree in canon law.

On 1 June 1985, he was ordained a priest for the Diocese of Łomza.

== Diplomatic career ==
He joined the diplomatic service of the Holy See on 1 July 1989 and filled assignments in Burundi, Malta, Albania, Zambia, Sri Lanka, Georgia, Ukraine, the Philippines, and Guatemala.

On 15 July 2014, Pope Francis named him apostolic nuncio to Burundi and titular archbishop of Diocletiana. He received his episcopal consecration on 9 August from Cardinal Pietro Parolin, Secretary of State.

On 29 September 2020, Pope Francis appointed him Apostolic Nuncio to Malaysia and to East Timor as well as Apostolic Delegate to Brunei.

On 28 February 2026, Pope Leo appointed him as Apostolic Nuncio to Malta.

On 25 April 2026, he was given the additional responsibilities for Libya.

== See also ==
- List of heads of the diplomatic missions of the Holy See

Diplomatic posts
Preceded by Franco Coppola	Apostolic Nuncio to Burundi; 2014–2020	Succeeded by Dieudonné Datonou
Preceded by Joseph Marino	Apostolic Nuncio to Malaysia and Timor-Leste; 2020–2026	Vacant
Preceded by Joseph Marino	Apostolic Delegate to Brunei; 2020–2026	Vacant
Preceded by Savio Hon	Apostolic Nuncio to Malta and Libya; 2026–present	Incumbent
