= Pietro Pavan =

His Eminence Pietro Pavan
- Cardinal-Deacon of San Francesco di Paola ai Monti
- Church: Roman Catholic Church
- Appointed: 25 May 1985
- Term ended: 26 December 1994
- Successor: Joseph-Marie Trịnh Như Khuê
- Previous post: Rector Magnificus of the Pontifical Lateran University (1969-73)

Orders
- Ordination: 8 July 1928 by Andrea Giacinto Longhin
- Created cardinal: 25 May 1985 by Pope John Paul II
- Rank: Cardinal-Deacon

Personal details
- Born: Pietro Pavan; 30 August 1903 Treviso, Kingdom of Italy
- Died: 26 December 1994 (aged 91) Rome, Italy
- Buried: Campo Verano
- Parents: Giuseppe Pavan; Maria Piccioli
- Education: Pontifical Gregorian University; University of Padua

Pietro Pavan (30 August 1903 - 26 December 1994) was an Italian Cardinal of the Roman Catholic Church from 1985 until his death in 1994. He was appointed by John Paul II on 25 May 1985. He helped draft the papal encyclical Pacem in terris.
