= Joseph Marino =

American prelate

His Excellency, The Most Reverend Joseph Marino
- President Emeritus of the Pontifical Ecclesiastical Academy
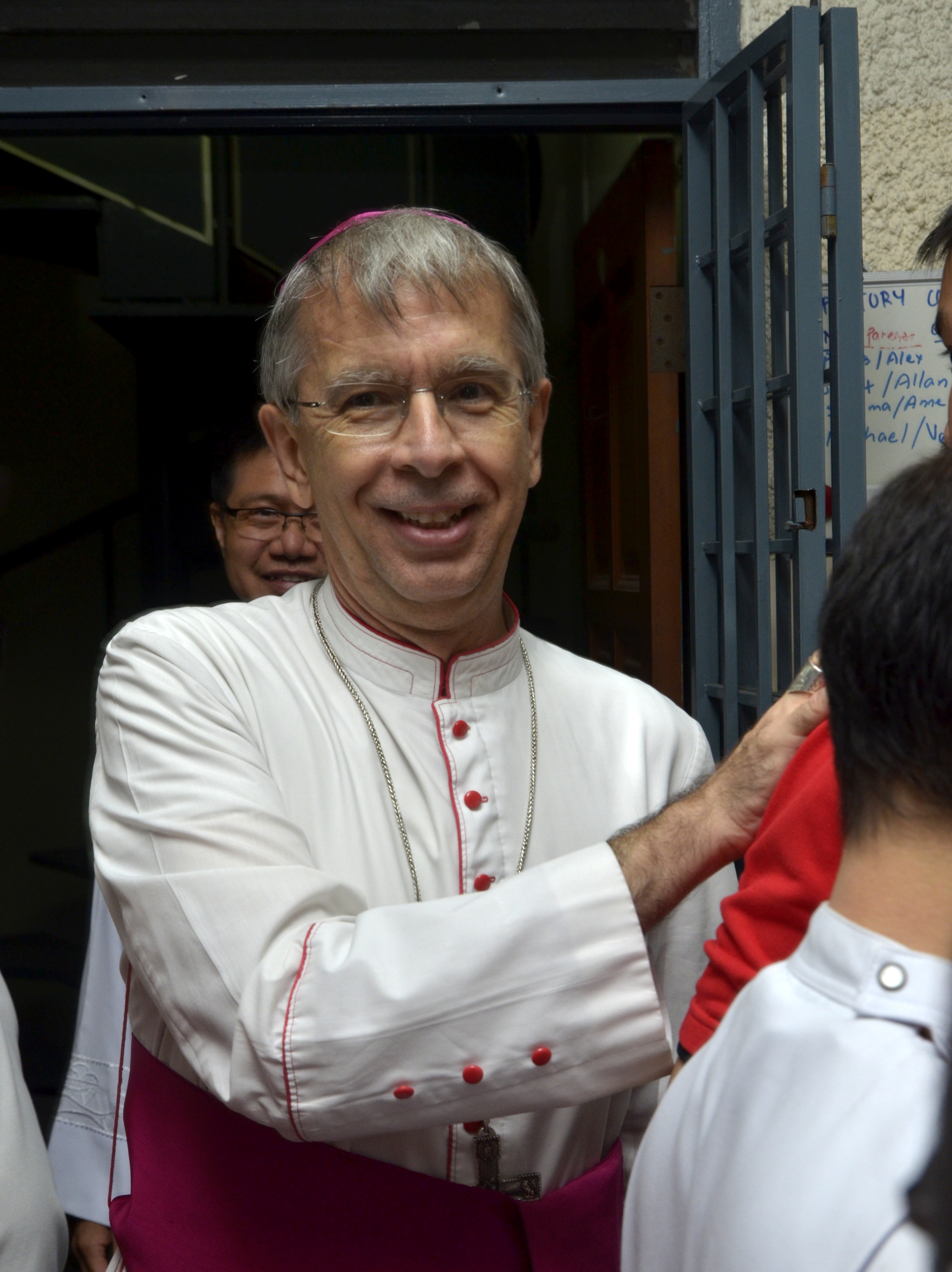
- Marino in 2013
- Church: Catholic Church
- Appointed: October 11, 2019
- Retired: January 23, 2023
- Predecessor: Giampiero Gloder
- Successor: Salvatore Pennacchio
- Other post: Titular Bishop of Natchitoches (2008 - )
- Previous posts: Apostolic Nuncio to Timor-Leste, Malaysia and Apostolic Delegate to Brunei (2013-2019); Apostolic Nuncio to Bangladesh (2008-2013)

Orders
- Ordination: August 25, 1979 by Bishop William Russell Houck
- Consecration: March 29, 2008 by Cardinal Jean-Louis Tauran

Personal details
- Born: January 23, 1953 (age 73) Birmingham, Alabama, US

Styles of Joseph Marino
- Reference style: His Excellency; The Most Reverend
- Spoken style: Your Excellency
- Religious style: Archbishop

Joseph Salvador Marino (Note: The Press Office of the Holy See, which customarily opts for more formal over less formal names, refers to him as Joseph Marino, as do press accounts of his activities. Cardinal Jean-Louis Tauran called him Joseph Marino when consecrating him a bishop.) (born January 23, 1953) is an American prelate of the Roman Catholic Church who worked in the Vatican diplomatic service from 1988 to 2019 and then served as president of the Pontifical Ecclesiastical Academy until 2023. He became an archbishop in 2008 and represented the Holy See in Bangladesh. After his post there, he represented the Holy See in Malaysia, East Timor, and Brunei for six years.

== Biography ==
=== Early years ===
Joseph Salvador Marino was born in Birmingham, Alabama, on January 23, 1953, one of three sons of Salvador Marino, an electrical engineer, and Josephine Marino. He grew up in the Ensley neighborhood of Birmingham and graduated from John Carroll High School in Birmingham in 1971. Marino earned degrees in philosophy and psychology from the University of Scranton in Scranton, Pennsylvania.

=== Priesthood ===
Marino was ordained a priest by Bishop William Houck on August 25, 1979, for the Diocese of Birmingham. Marino received degrees in theology and biblical theology from the Pontifical Gregorian University while living at the Pontifical North American College from 1975 to 1980. Marino returned to Birmingham for four years of pastoral work as associate pastor at St. Paul's Cathedral Parish. In 1984 he entered the Pontifical Ecclesiastical Academy to prepare for a career in the diplomatic service while obtaining a Doctor of Canon Law degree from the Gregorian.

== Diplomatic career ==
Marino joined the diplomatic service on July 15, 1988. His early assignments included stints in the Philippines from 1988 to 1991, Uruguay from 1991 to 1994, and Nigeria from 1994 to 1997. From 1997 to 2004, Marino worked at the Secretariat of State in Rome, where he had responsibility for the Balkans countries. He participated as senior staff-member in two diplomatic missions: Cardinal Jean-Louis Tauran's visit to Belgrade, Serbia, on April 1, 1999, that sought a resolution to the Kosovo War; and the meeting between U.S. President George W. Bush and Cardinal Pio Laghi in which Laghi unsuccessfully tried to dissuade Bush from invading Iraq in 2003.

Marino was working in the apostolic nunciature to the United Kingdom when, on January 12, 2008, Pope Benedict XVI named him a titular archbishop and apostolic nuncio to Bangladesh. He received his episcopal consecration from Cardinal Tauran on March 29, 2008, at the Cathedral of St. Paul in Birmingham.

On January 16, 2013, Pope Benedict appointed Marino as apostolic nuncio to Malaysia, apostolic nuncio to East Timor, and apostolic delegate to Brunei. He negotiated the 2015 accord between the Holy See and East Timor.

Pope Francis named Marino president of the Pontifical Ecclesiastical Academy on October 11, 2019. He was the second American to lead the school.

Pope Francis appointed Marino a member of the Dicastery for Evangelization on November 17, 2020.

On January 23, 2023, Pope Francis accepted his resignation as president of the Pontifical Ecclesiastical Academy.

== See also ==
- List of heads of the diplomatic missions of the Holy See

== Notes ==
Diplomatic posts
Preceded by Leopoldo Girelli	Apostolic Nuncio to Malaysia; 16 January 2013 – 11 October 2019	Succeeded by Wojciech Załuski
Preceded by Paul Tschang In-Nam	Apostolic Nuncio to Bangladesh; 12 January 2008 – 16 January 2013	Succeeded by George Kocherry
Educational offices
Preceded by Giampiero Gloder	President of the Pontifical Ecclesiastical Academy; 2019–2023	Succeeded by Salvatore Pennacchio
