= Salvatore Asta =

Italian prelate

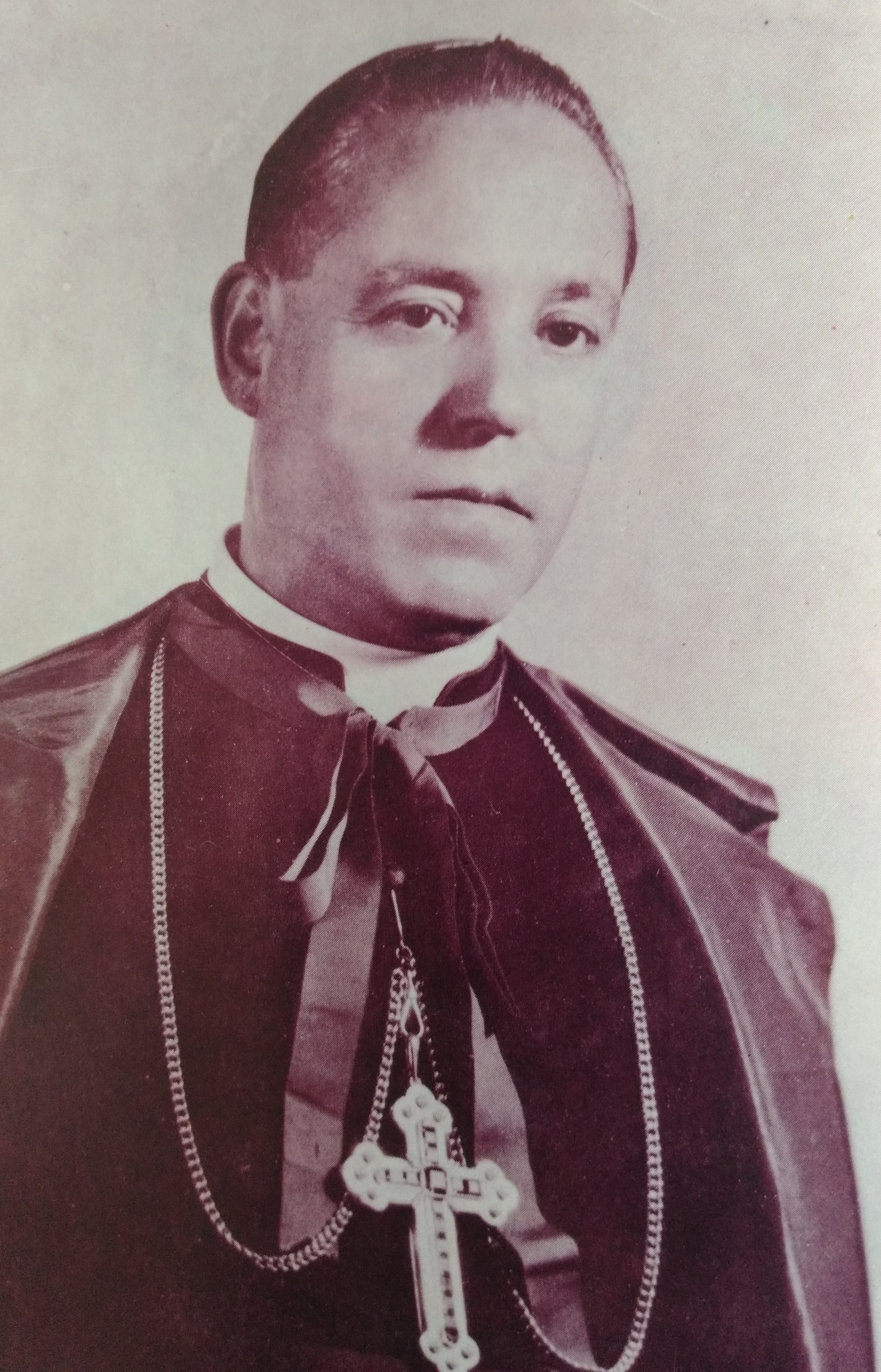
Salvatore Asta

Salvatore Asta (17 January 1915 – 30 December 2004) was an Italian prelate of the Catholic Church who worked in the diplomatic service of the Holy See.

== Biography ==
Salvatore Asta was born in Alcamo, Italy, on 17 January 1915. He was ordained a priest on 25 July 1938.

To prepare for a diplomatic career he entered the Pontifical Ecclesiastical Academy in 1940.

On 13 October 1962, Pope John XXIII named him a titular archbishop and Apostolic Delegate to Indochina. He received his episcopal consecration from Cardinal Amleto Cicognani on 25 November 1962.

On 23 March 1964, Pope Paul VI appointed him Apostolic Internuncio to Iran. His title changed to Apostolic Pro-Nuncio to Iran on 25 March 1966.

On 7 June 1969, Pope Paul appointed him Apostolic Pro-Nuncio to Turkey.

On 21 July 1984, Pope John Paul II named him Apostolic Nuncio to Portugal.

He retired when replaced in that post in July 1989.

Salvatore Asta died on 30 December 2004.
