= Giovanni d'Aniello =

Italian nuncio

His Excellency, The Most Reverend Giovanni d'Aniello
- Apostolic Nuncio of Russia and Uzbekistan; Titular Archbishop of Paestum
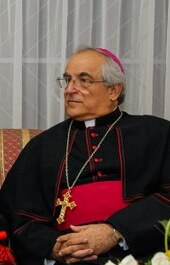
- Appointed: 1 June 2020
- Predecessor: Celestino Migliore
- Other post: Titular Archbishop of Paestum
- Previous posts: Apostolic Nuncio to Brazil (2012-2020); Apostolic Nuncio to Cambodia, Thailand and Apostolic Delegate to Laos and Myanmar (2010-2012); Apostolic Nuncio to the Democratic Republic of the Congo (2001-2010)

Orders
- Ordination: 8 December 1978 by Antonio Cece
- Consecration: 6 January 2002 by Pope John Paul II, Leonardo Sandri, and Robert Sarah

Personal details
- Born: January 5, 1955 (age 71) Aversa, Italy

Styles of Giovanni d'Aniello
- Reference style: His Excellency; The Most Reverend
- Spoken style: Your Excellency
- Religious style: Archbishop

Giovanni d’Aniello (born 5 January 1955) is an Italian prelate of the Catholic Church who works in the diplomatic service of the Holy See. An archbishop since 2001, he was appointed Apostolic Nuncio to the Russian Federation on 1 June 2020. He has been apostolic nuncio or apostolic delegate to the Democratic Republic of the Congo, Thailand, Cambodia, Burma, Laos, and Brazil.

== Biography ==
Born in Aversa in the Campania Region of Italy on 5 January 1955, d'Aniello studied at the local seminary and was ordained a priest on 8 December 1978.

He obtained a doctorate in canon law. To prepare for a diplomatic career, he entered the Pontifical Ecclesiastical Academy in 1979.

== Diplomatic career ==
He joined the diplomatic service of the Holy See on 1 June 1983 and his early postings took him to Burundi, Thailand, Lebanon, and Brazil. He also worked in Rome in the Section for Relations with the States of the Secretariat of State of the Holy See, where he had responsibility for the Middle East.

On 15 December 2001, Pope John Paul II appointed him titular archbishop of Paestum and Pontifical Representative to the Democratic Republic of the Congo. He received his episcopal consecration on 6 January 2002 from Pope John Paul. His title was changed to Apostolic Nuncio on 12 January 2002.

On 22 September 2010, Pope Benedict XVI named him Nuncio to both Thailand and Cambodia as well as Apostolic Delegate to both Myanmar and Laos. In March 2011, on a visit with Burmese refugees at a camp in Thailand he offered support and said that the "Church’s work for refugees is an essential work of the Church".

On 10 February 2012, he was named Apostolic Nuncio to Brazil.

On 1 June 2020, Pope Francis appointed him Apostolic Nuncio to the Russian Federation.

== See also ==
- List of heads of the diplomatic missions of the Holy See
