= Adriano Bernardini =

Italian prelate of the Catholic Church (1942–2025)

His Excellency, The Most Reverend Adriano Bernardini
- Apostolic Nuncio; Titular Archbishop of Falerii
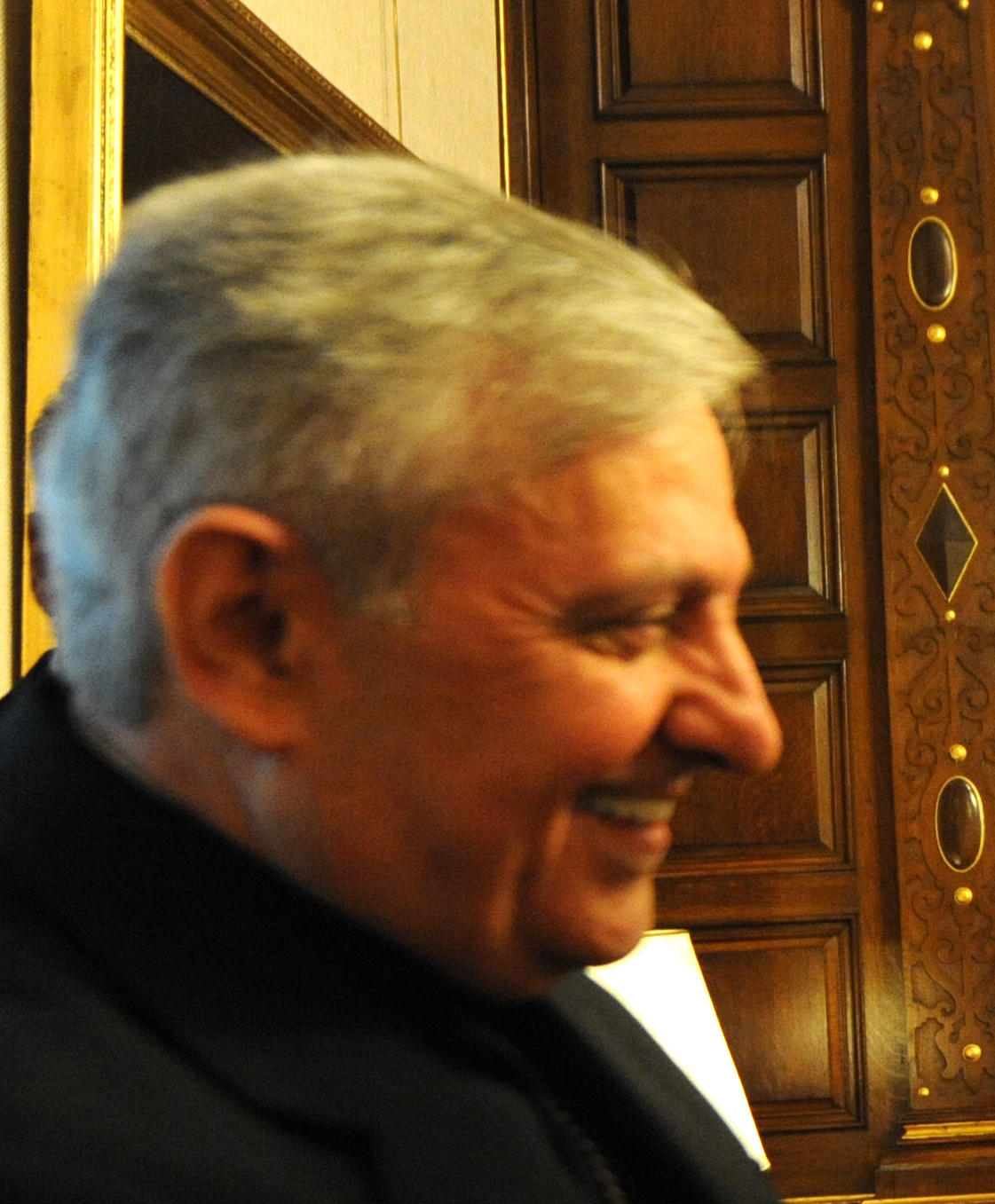
- Adriano Bernardini, 2011
- Appointed: 15 November 2011
- Retired: 12 September 2017
- Predecessor: Giuseppe Bertello
- Successor: Emil Paul Tscherrig
- Other post: Titular Archbishop of Falerii (1992–2025)
- Previous posts: Apostolic Nuncio to San Marino and Italy (2011–2017); Apostolic Nuncio to Argentina (2003–2011); Apostolic Nuncio to Cambodia, Singapore, Thailand and Apostolic Delegate to Brunei, Laos, Malaysia, Myanmar (1999–2003); Apostolic Nuncio to Madagascar, Mauritius and Seychelles (1996–1999); Apostolic Nuncio to Bangladesh (1992–1996); Chargé d’affaires to China (1988–1992)

Orders
- Ordination: 31 March 1968 by Egidio Vagnozzi
- Consecration: 15 November 1992 by Angelo Sodano, Josip Uhač, and Remigio Ragonesi

Personal details
- Born: 13 August 1942 Piandimeleto, Italy
- Died: 11 September 2025 (aged 83) Rome, Italy
- Motto: Pax In Fortitudine

Styles of Adriano Bernardini
- Reference style: His Excellency; The Most Reverend
- Spoken style: Your Excellency
- Religious style: Archbishop

Adriano Bernardini (13 August 1942 – 11 September 2025) was an Italian prelate of the Catholic Church who occupied positions in the diplomatic service of the Holy See from the 1970s until he retired in 2017. His first assignment as Apostolic Nuncio was to Bangladesh (1992–1995) and his last to Italy (2011–2017). He was an archbishop since 1992.

== Biography ==
On 31 March 1968, Bernardini was ordained a priest for the Diocese of Rome by Cardinal Egidio Cardinal Vagnozzi. He attended the Pontifical Ecclesiastical Academy to study diplomacy and earn a doctorate in canon law.

=== Diplomatic career ===
Bernardini's first assignment in the diplomatic service of the Holy See was in the Apostolic Nunciature to Pakistan, which also follows events in Afghanistan. He later worked in the nunciatures of Angola, Japan, Venezuela and Spain. On 17 January 1989, he was appointed chargé d'affaires of the nunciature in Taiwan. On 20 August 1992, just days after his 50th birthday, he was appointed Titular Archbishop of Falerii and Apostolic Nuncio to Bangladesh. He received his episcopal consecration on 15 November 1992 from Cardinal Angelo Sodano.

Bernardini remained in Bangladesh until 15 June 1996, when he was appointed Apostolic Nuncio to Madagascar, Mauritius and the Seychelles. He was next appointed Nuncio to Thailand, Singapore and Cambodia and Apostolic Delegate to Burma, Laos, Malaysia and Brunei on 24 July 1999. Pope John Paul II named him Apostolic Nuncio to Argentina on 26 April 2003. His years there were marked by sharp differences between the Argentine bishops, notably Cardinal Jorge Bergoglio (later Pope Francis), and Bernardini as representative of Secretary of State Cardinal Angelo Sodano.

Pope Benedict XVI named him Nuncio to Italy and San Marino on 15 November 2011. In 2014, he conducted an investigation into charges of scandalous behaviour by priests in the Diocese of Albenga-Imperia, which led to further investigation and the removal of a bishop. His career in the diplomatic service ended on 12 September 2017, when he was replaced as Nuncio to Italy by the first non-Italian to hold the position since Italy and the Holy See established full diplomatic ties in 1929.

On 4 October 2017, Pope Francis named him a member of the Congregation for the Evangelization of Peoples.

=== Death ===
Bernardini died on 11 September 2025, 29 days after his 83rd birthday.

== See also ==
- List of heads of the diplomatic missions of the Holy See

Catholic Church titles
Preceded by Blasco Francisco Collaço	Apostolic Nuncio to Madagascar; 15 June 1996 – 24 July 1999	Succeeded by Bruno Musarò
Preceded by Santos Abril y Castelló	Apostolic Nuncio to Argentina; 26 April 2003 – 15 November 2011	Succeeded by Emil Paul Tscherrig
Preceded by Giuseppe Bertello	Apostolic Nunciature to Italy; 15 November 2011 – 12 September 2017	Succeeded by Emil Paul Tscherrig
Preceded by Orazio Semeraro	Titular Archbishop of Falerii; 20 August 1992 – 11 September 2025	Succeeded by Vacant
