= Silvio Luoni =

Italian prelate of the Catholic Church

- Apostolic Pro-Nuncio to Thailand; Apostolic Delegate to Laos, Malaysia and Singapore
- Church: Catholic Church
- In office: 15 May 1978 – 1980
- Predecessor: Giovanni Moretti
- Successor: Renato Martino
- Other post: Titular Archbishop of Turris in Mauretania (1978-1982)
- Previous post: Permanent Observer of the Holy See to the United Nations in Geneva (1971-1978)

Orders
- Ordination: 1 October 1944
- Consecration: 25 June 1978 by Giovanni Colombo

Personal details
- Born: 7 July 1920 Busto Arsizio, Province of Milan, Kingdom of Italy
- Died: 11 April 1982 (aged 61)

Silvio Luoni (7 July 1920 – 11 April 1982) was an Italian prelate of the Catholic Church who worked in the Vatican's Secretariat of State and in the diplomatic service of the Holy See.

== Biography ==
Silvio Luoni was born in Busto Arsizio, Italy, on 7 July 1920. He was ordained a priest of the Archdiocese of Milan on 1 October 1944.

He joined the staff of the Secretariat of State in 1950 or 1953. On 12 September 1966, then a priest of the Diocese of Rome, he was made a Prelate of Honour of His Holiness, entitled "Monsignor". One focus of his responsibilities at the Secretariat was international organizations of lay Catholics, whose role in supporting the Holy See's participation in international organizations was critical to Pope Paul foreign policy.

On 9 July 1969, Pope Paul VI appointed him Permanent Observer of the Holy See to the Food and Agriculture Organization of the United Nations (FAO) in Rome.

On 12 August 1971, Pope Paul appointed him Permanent Observer of the Holy See to the United Nations in Geneva.

On 15 May 1978, Pope John Paul II named him titular archbishop of Turris in Mauretania, Apostolic Pro-Nuncio to Thailand, and Apostolic Delegate to Laos, Malaysia, and Singapore. He received his episcopal consecration from Cardinal Giovanni Umberto Colombo, Archbishop of Milan, on 25 June 1978.

Pope John Paul II named him head of the Vatican delegation to the Madrid conference of the Conference on Security and Co-operation in Europe (CSCE) in 1980/81. He died after a long illness in a Milan hospital on 11 April 1982 at the age of 61.
