= Mario Brini =

Mario Brini (11 May 1908 – 9 December 1995) was an Italian prelate of the Catholic Church who worked in the diplomat in the Secretariat of State of the Holy See and in the Roman Curia.

== Biography ==
Mario Brini was born in Piombino, Italy, on 11 May 1908. He was ordained a priest on 29 June 1938. During the Second World War, Brini worked as the resident expert on the Soviet Union for the Secretariat of State.

During the chaos that surrounded the Liberation of Rome in 1944, Alexander Kurtna, an Estonian national who worked from 1940-1944 as a translator at the Congregation for the Eastern Churches while spying for both Nazi Germany and Joseph Stalin's NKVD, turned the tables on his SS handler, Herbert Kappler, by stealing the top secret Sicherheitsdienst codebooks from Kappler's office. Kurtna then passed the codebooks to Monsignor Mario Brini, who delivered them at Kurtna's instructions to the Soviet Government.

On 12 September 1959, Pope John XXIII named him Apostolic Delegate to Indochina. He was named a titular archbishop on 14 October 1961 and received his episcopal consecration from Cardinal Amleto Cicognani on 28 January 1962.

On 13 June 1962, Pope John appointed him Apostolic Internuncio to Egypt (United Arab Republic).

On 2 October 1965, Pope Paul VI named him Secretary (Assessore) of the Congregation for the Oriental Churches. He retired upon the appointment of his successor, Myroslav Marusyn, on 14 September 1982.

Mario Brini died on 9 December 1995.

Brini played a major role in the 1999 exposé of scandalous behavior by Vatican officials, Gone with the Wind in the Vatican by Monsignor Luigi Marinelli. His family sued the publisher to have all copies of the book destroyed, prompting further publicity for the book's claims.
