= Costantino Aiuti =

Roman-catholic archbishop

Constantino Aiuti
- Apostolic Delegate to Indochina
- Church: Catholic Church
- See: Apostolic Delegation to Indochina
- In office: 28 May 1925 – 29 July 1928
- Predecessor: Position established
- Successor: Victor Dreyer
- Other post: Titular Archbishop of Phasis (1925-1928)

Orders
- Ordination: 14 April 1900
- Consecration: 29 June 1925 by Willem Marinus van Rossum

Personal details
- Born: 1 May 1876 Sezze, Province of Rome, Kingdom of Italy
- Died: 29 July 1928 (aged 52) Indochinese Union, French Empire

Costantino Aiuti (Note: Self-published secondary sources use other spellings, including Aiutti and Ajutti; they also render his first name as Constantino. The Acta Apostolicae Sedis uses Aiuti four times and Ajuti once. A polyglot publication, it uses Costantino as his first name in Italian and Constantino in Latin. Charles Keith uses Aiuti and both versions of the first name. A directory published shortly after his appointment to Indochina uses Costantino Aiuti, as do other scholars.) (1 May 1876 – 29 July 1928) was an Italian prelate of the Catholic Church who worked in the diplomatic service of the Holy See. He died during his first major posting as the first Apostolic Delegate to Indochina.

== Biography ==
Costantino Aiuti was born in Sezze, on 1 May 1876. He was ordained a priest on 14 April 1900.

On 23 June 1921, he was named a papal chamberlain.

He was on the staff of the Congregation for the Propagation of the Faith (Note: Keith appears to be incorrect in describing Aiuti as "an Italian priest working in China" when named Delegate to Indochina.) when, on 28 May 1925, Pope Pius XI named him a titular bishop and the first Apostolic Delegate to Indochina. He received his episcopal consecration in Rome from Cardinal Willem van Rossum on 29 June 1925.

The French missionaries and bishops long accustomed to managing Church affairs in Indochina did not welcome the establishment of a Vatican delegation for the region nor the appointment of an Italian to head it. Aiuti encouraged the creation of educational institutions, seminaries with standard curricula and admissions standards, and libraries. He established a monthly publication, Sacerdos Indosinensis, written by and for Vietnamese clergy. The French press reported only his formal statements and activities while Vietnamese Catholic newspapers described his travels and pastoral visits in great detail, noting his praise of the Vietnamese priests for their Latin and of missionaries who shared meals with their Vietnamese colleagues. Based in Vietnam, his tours included Laos and Siam, with at least one automobile trip that covered 2500 miles.

Aiuti died in Vietnam on 29 July 1928 at the age of 52. Rumors that Aiuti had been poisoned by French priests reflected the undisguised antagonism his activities had aroused, and a Vietnamese priest complained to the Vatican that only "rotten ornaments worth nothing" had been placed in Auiti's casket as a sign of disrespect.
