= Luigi Bressan =

Former Archbishop of Trento

- Archbishop Emeritus of Trento
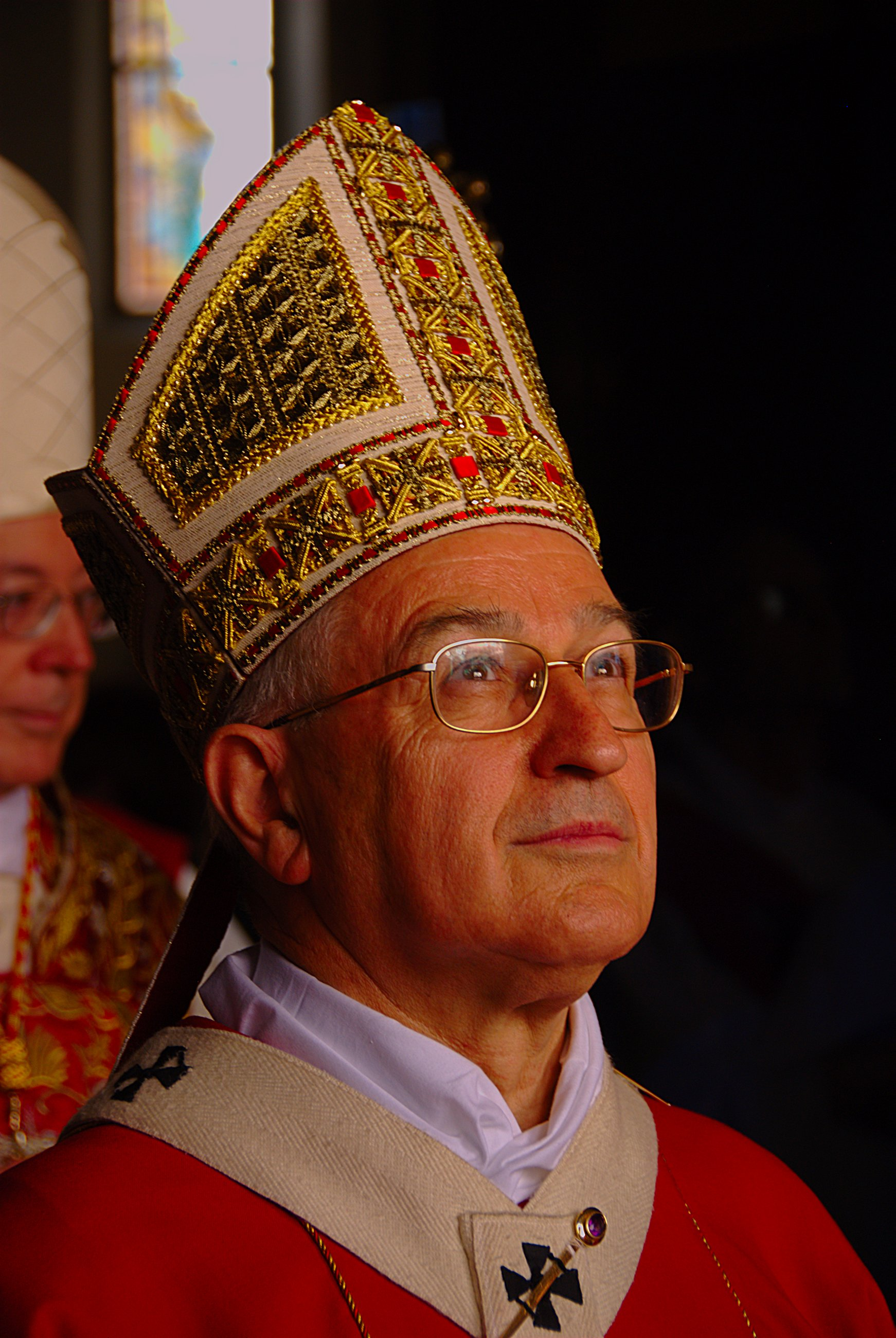
- Church: Catholic Church
- In office: 1999–2016
- Predecessor: Giovanni Maria Sartori
- Successor: Lauro Tisi

Orders
- Ordination: 28 June 1964
- Consecration: 18 June 1989 by Agostino Casaroli

Personal details
- Born: February 9, 1940; Sarche, Province of Trentino, Italy

Luigi Bressan (born 9 February 1940) is an Italian prelate of the Catholic Church who worked from 1971 to 1999 in the diplomatic service of the Holy See and then served as Archbishop of Trento until 2016.

== Biography ==
Luigi Bressan was born on 9 February 1940 in Sarche, Province of Trentino, the fourth of eleven children. He was ordained a priest on 28 June 1964. His first posts were as parochial vicar of Besenello and Riva del Garda.

He completed the course of studies at the Pontifical Ecclesiastical Academy in 1967 and earned a degree in canon law at the Pontifical Gregorian University in 1971.

He was secretary of the nunciature in South Korea from 1971 to 1974 and in the Ivory Coast from 1974 to 1976. He then worked in Rome at the Secretariat of State until, in December 1978, he was named Permanent Observer of the Holy See to the United Nations in Geneva. Then in Brazil in 1982. In 1983 he was appointed Permanent Observer of the Holy See at the Council of Europe in Strasbourg.

On 3 April 1989, Pope John Paul II appointed him titular archbishop of Severiana and Apostolic Pro-Nuncio to Pakistan. He received his episcopal ordination on 18 June in the Cathedral of San Vigilio in Trento from Cardinal Agostino Casaroli.

On 26 July 1993, he was appointed apostolic nuncio to Singapore and Thailand and apostolic delegate to Malaysia and Brunei, Laos, and Burma. (Note: On 2 February 1998, his appointment as "Apostolic Delegate to Malaysia and Brunei" was restated as two distinct titles.)

In addition to those duties, on 16 July 1994, he was appointed the first apostolic nuncio to Cambodia, after the re-establishment of diplomatic relations between Cambodia and the Holy See on 25 March.

To mark the centenary of the visit of the first non-Christian monarch to the Vatican, Bressan authored King Chulalongkorn and Leo XIII: Siam and the Vatican in the 19th Century in 1998.

On 25 March 1999, Pope John Paul II appointed him Archbishop of Trento, a posting said to require the skills of a diplomat to reconcile factions within the Archdiocese. He was installed there on 30 May.

On 10 February 2016, Pope Francis accepted his resignation.

== Writings ==
- Libertà religiosa nel diritto internazionale. Dichiarazioni e norme internazionali (in Italian). Padua: CEDAM. 1989.
- A Meeting of Worlds (Christianity and Thai culture). Bangkok. 2000.
- Maria nella devozione e pittura dell'Islam (in Italian). Milan: Jaca. 2011. ISBN 9788816409859.
- As editor. Celestino Endrici contro il Reich. Athesia. 2019. ISBN 9788868393595. Document collection.
