= Bartolo (surname) =

Bartolo or di Bartolo is an Italian and Maltese patronymic surname from the given name Bartolo. Notable people with the surname include:

- Andrea di Bartolo (1360–1428), Medieval Italian painter, stained glass designer and illuminator of the Sienese School
- Ansano di Andrea di Bartolo (1421-1491), Italian painter
- Augusto Bartolo (1883–1937), Maltese journalist, politician and judge
- Benedetto Bartolo (1627–1685), Italian Roman Catholic prelate
- Chucky Bartolo (born 1993), Maltese stand-up comedian and drag queen
- Clayton Bartolo (born 1987), Maltese politician
- Domenico di Bartolo (1400–1445), Early Renaissance Italian painter
- Erasmo di Bartolo (1606–1656), Italian composer
- Evarist Bartolo (born 1952), Maltese politician
- Francesco Di Bartolo (1826–1913), Italian engraver and painter
- Francesco Di Bartolo (footballer) (born 2005), Italian footballer
- Giuseppe Di Bartolo (1900–1943), WW II Italian naval officer
- Ivan Bartolo, Maltese politician
- Ivan J Bartolo, Maltese politician
- Jaiden Bartolo (born 2006), Gibraltarian footballer
- Joe Bartolo (born 1969), Australian rugby league footballer
- Julián Bartolo (born 1996), Argentine footballer
- Leanne Bartolo (born 1987), Maltese champion bodybuilder
- Nanni di Bartolo (1450–1450), Florentine Renaissance sculptor
- Natalia Di Bartolo (born 1958), Italian dramatist, musicologist and music critic
- Pace di Bartolo (14th century), Italian painter
- Pietro Bartolo (born 1956), Italian politician
- Sal Bartolo (1917–2002), American boxer
- Taddeo di Bartolo (c. 1363–1422), Italian painter
- Xavi Bartolo (born 1968), Spanish footballer and manager
- Yorman Polas Bartolo (born 1985), Cuban-German basketball player

== See also ==
- Bartolo (disambiguation)
- Bartolo (given name)
