= Bartolucci =

Bartolucci (pronounced [bartoˈluttʃi]) is an Italian surname, originating from the given name Bartolo. Notable people with the surname include:

- Athos Bartolucci (1902–1992), Italian Fascist politician and journalist
- Domenico Bartolucci (1917–2013), Italian Cardinal and director of the Sistine Chapel choir
- Francisco Bartolucci (born 1949), Chilean politician
- Gino Bartolucci (1905–1998), an Italian cyclist
- Giovanni Bartolucci (born 1984), Italian footballer
- Marcello Bartolucci (born 1944), Italian Roman Catholic titular archbishop
- Octavio Bartolucci (born 1975), Argentine rugby union player
- Rick Bartolucci (born 1943), Canadian politician

== See also ==
- 33480 Bartolucci, a main-belt asteroid
- Bartolocci
- Bertolacci
- Bertolucci (surname)
