= Bertolo =

Bertolo (pronounced [ˈbɛrtolo]) is an Italian given name and surname. Notable people with this surname include:

- Constantino Bértolo (born 1946), Spanish publisher and writer
- Dino Bertolo (born 1953), French cyclist
- Mario Bertolo (1929–2009), French cyclist
- Nicolás Bertolo (born 1986), Argentinian footballer

== See also ==
- Bartolo (given name)
- Bartolo (surname)
- Bertol (surname)
- Bertolacci
- Bertoli
- Bertolini
- Bertoloni
- Bertolucci
