= Bertolino =

Bertolino is an Italian surname. Notable people with the surname include:

- Cláudio Bertolino (born 1963), Brazilian racewalker
- Enrique Bertolino (1912–1997), Argentine golfer
- James Bertolino (born 1942), American poet
- Jean Bertolino (born 1936), French journalist and writer
- John Bertolino (1914–2003), American photojournalist
- Mónica Bertolino (born 1957), Argentinean architect
- Damián González Bertolino (born 1980), Uruguayan writer

== See also ==
- Bertolin
- Bertolini
- Barbera bianca
