= Bertol =

Bertol may refer to:

- Bertol (surname)
- Dents de Bertol, a multi-summited mountain in the Swiss Pennine Alps
- Pointe de Bertol, a mountain in the Swiss Pennine Alps
- Bertol Hut, a mountain hut overlooking the Bertol Pass in Valais, Switzerland
- Antonio Bertoloni or Bertol., botanist

== See also ==
- Bertoloni
- Giuseppe Bertoloni or G.Bertol., botanist
