= Bertolucci (surname) =

Bertolucci (pronounced [bertoˈluttʃi]) is an Italian surname, originating from the given name Bertolo. Notable people with the surname include:

- Attilio Bertolucci (1911–2000), Italian poet and writer
- Bernardo Bertolucci (1941–2018), Italian film director and screenwriter
- Davide Bertolucci (born 1988), Italian footballer
- Giuseppe Bertolucci (1947–2012), Italian film director and screenwriter
- Luana Bertolucci Paixão (born 1993), Brazilian footballer
- Paolo Bertolucci (born 1951), Italian tennis player
- Sergio Bertolucci (born 1950), Italian particle physicist

== See also ==
- Bartolocci
- Bartolucci
- Bertolacci
