= Bertold =

Given name

Bertold is a given name and a surname. Notable people with the name include:

== Given name ==
- Bertold Brühaven, Teutonic knight from the then Duchy of Austria, Komtur of Königsberg from 1289 to 1302
- Bertold Eisner (1875–1956), Croatian Jewish law professor at the University of Zagreb
- Bertold Hummel (1925–2002), German composer of modern classical music
- Bertold Löffler (1874–1960), Austrian painter, printmaker, and designer
- Bertold Mainka (born 1934), Polish rower
- Bertold Popovics (born 1991), Hungarian midfielder
- Bertold Posselt, Austrian luger who competed in the early 1910s
- Bertold of Regensburg (1220–1272), German preacher during the high Middle Ages
- Bertold Reissig (1877–1960), German stage and film actor
- Bertold Wiesner FRSE (1901–1972), Austrian Jewish physiologist

== Surname ==
- Isabella Bertold (born 1991), Canadian sailor and cyclist

== See also ==
- Berchtold
- Berthold (disambiguation)
- Bertholds (disambiguation)
- Bertol (disambiguation)
- Bertoldi
- Bertoldo
