= Christian Peregin =

Maltese Journalist

- Born: November 24, 1987 (age 38); Malta
- Education: University of Malta
- Occupations: Journalist; Entrepreneur; Communications strategist
- Years active: 2008–present
- Known for: Founder of Lovin Malta; Journalism awards; Media‑political strategy
- Website: christianperegin.com

Christian Peregin (born 24 November 1987) is a Maltese journalist, entrepreneur, and communications strategist. He is the founder of Lovin Malta, a prominent digital media platform in Malta, and is known for his contributions to journalism, political strategy, and start-up consultancy.

== Early life and education ==
Peregin was raised in Msida and later moved to Naxxar. He attended San Anton School, followed by St. Aloysius College for his sixth form education. He earned a bachelor's degree (Hons.) in communications from the University of Malta.

== Career ==
=== Journalism ===
Peregin began his journalism career with a focus on investigative reporting at Times of Malta. He received the News Journalist of the Year award at the Malta Journalism Awards in 2011, won in the Print Features category in 2012, and in 2013 received the E-Journalism Award. After five years at Times of Malta, he became the PR Director at the branding agency BRND WGN.

=== Lovin Malta ===
In 2016, Peregin founded Lovin Malta, a digital media platform that is one of Malta’s most-followed news outlets, particularly with younger audience demographics. In 2020, Lovin Malta won five awards at the 30th Malta Journalism Awards, including Best Online Journalism.

=== Advocacy for Media Reform ===
Peregin has actively engaged in media reform efforts in Malta. He led Lovin Malta’s legal challenge against partisan media stations, advocating for independent journalism and greater transparency in government spending on social media. The campaign to expose the misuse of public funds for political advertising on Facebook contributed to the introduction of new guidelines by the Standards Commissioner in Malta.

=== Political Involvement ===
In July 2021, Peregin resigned from Lovin Malta to join the Nationalist Party (PN) as its chief strategist for the 2022 general election, citing concerns about governance and the potential emergence of a one-party state in Malta. Following the election, he stepped away from politics in April 2022.

=== Post-Politics: Start-up & PR Consultancy ===
After leaving politics, Peregin joined Blonde and Giant, a branding agency that assists global start-ups in raising venture capital. He served as Head of Startup Services and became a member of Silicon Valletta, a network of entrepreneurs in Malta’s tech sector.

=== Other projects ===
In 2019, while CEO of Lovin Malta, he launched of the Lovin Social Media Awards, an annual event celebrating Malta’s leading social media influencers and digital creators, with the first event taking place in 2019, hosted by Chucky Bartolo. This award show was followed by the Lovin Malta Music Awards later that year.

In 2020 he served as a principal writer and producer of Kaxxaturi, an investigative and satirical online series that addressed political and social issues in Malta, and contributed to crowdfunding efforts for Lovin Malta’s legal challenge against political party stations.

Peregin also co-produced Daniel Holmes: A Memoir (2021), which recounts the story of a Welshman imprisoned in Malta for cannabis cultivation, addressing issues in Malta’s drug laws and prison system.
