= Bertolin =

Origin
- Region of origin: Northern Italy

The Bertolin surname likely originated in the Alpine region, most probably in Northern Italy. It may be a patronymic derived from medieval first names such as Bertold, Berthold or Bertholin. The prefix "Bert" could stem from the Lombard word "''berht''", meaning bright or illustrious.

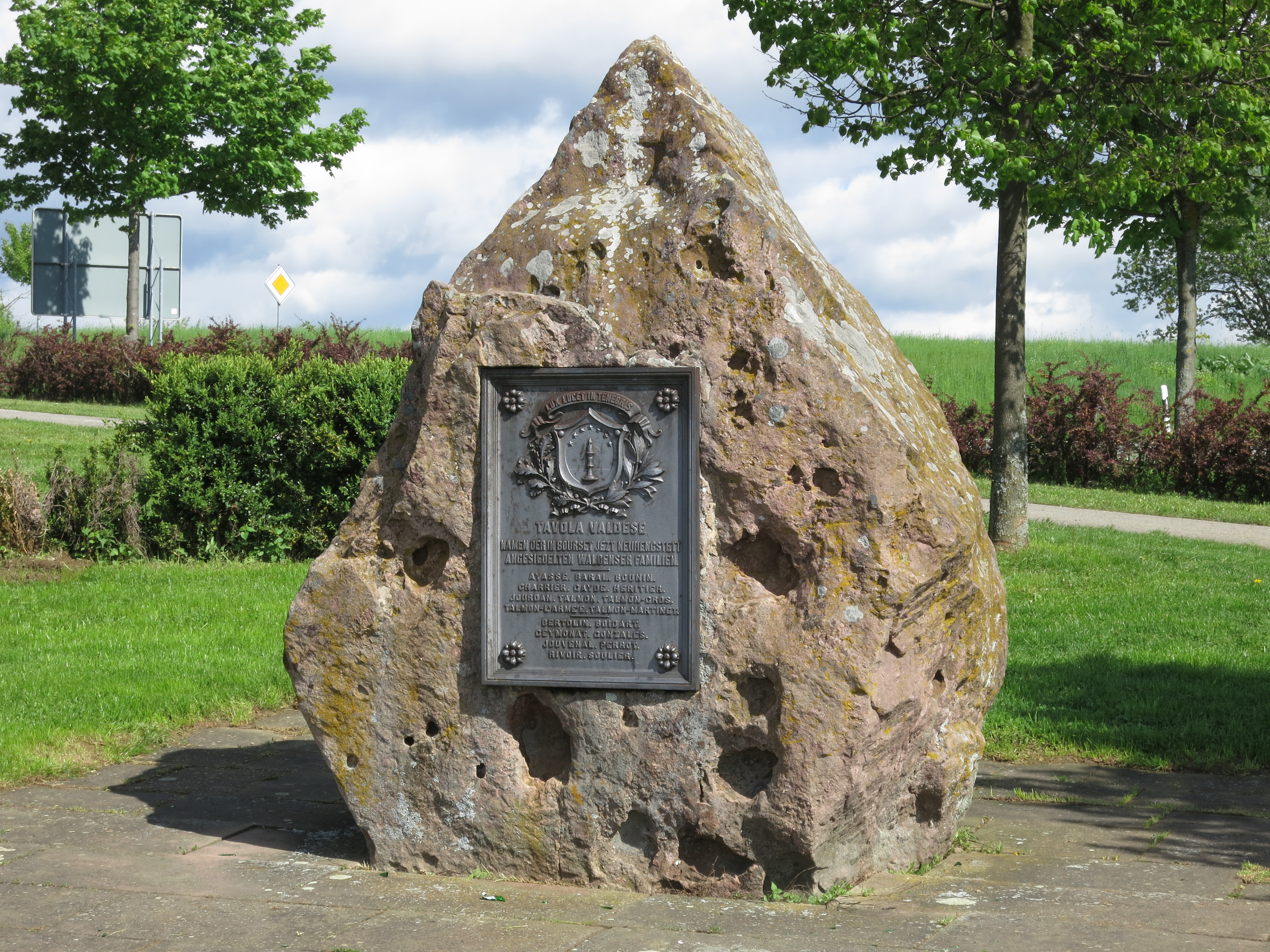
The Waldensian stone located north of Le Bourcet (now part of Althengstett), was erected to commemorate the town's original settler families. The Bertolin surname is among those inscribed.

A commemorative monument known as the Waldensian Stone was erected north of Le Bourcet (now part of Althengstett) to honor the town's original settler families, including those with the Bertolin surname. Le Bourcet was named after the Italian village of Bourcet in the Cottian Alps, from which the majority of the settlers originated. This connection suggests that the Bertolin surname may have a more specific origin linked to Bourcet.

== Notable people ==
Notable people with this surname include:

- Brunello Bertolin (born 1943), Italian long-distance runner
- Manlio Bertolin (born 1924, Casarsa della Delizia), Italian footballer
- Silvano Bertolin (born 1938, Casarsa della Delizia), Italian restorer and sculptor

== Surname frequency and distribution within Italy ==
Italian Region	Incidence	Frequency	Rank in Area
Veneto	1,338	1:3,717	726
Friuli-Venezia Giulia	472	1:2,697	492
Valle d'Aosta	231	1:551	116
Piedmont	60	1:74,388	11,320
Lombardy	49	1:199,471	18,132
Trentino-Alto Adige	34	1:25,912	3,685
Emilia-Romagna	27	1:166,849	11,607
Lazio	20	1:286,562	28,978
Liguria	3	1:535,857	17,585
Marche	1	1:1,571,435	18,471
Sicily	1	1:5,200,492	24,265
Tuscany	1	1:3,869,086	41,203

== See also ==
- Bertolini
- Bertolino
