= Bertoli =

Bertoli is a surname of Italian origin, an abbreviated version of Bartolomeo. It may refer to:

- Dante Bertoli (1913–1996), Italian wrestler
- Evelina Bertoli (born 1986), Italian equestrian
- Fabio Bertoli (born 1996), Italian footballer
- Franco Bertoli (born 1959), Italian former volleyball playe
- Giovanni Antonio Bertoli (fl. 1645), Italian composer of the early baroque
- Jack Vicajee Bertoli (born 1931), Indian planner and architect, naturalised as a Swiss citizen
- Mauro Bertoli, Italian guitarist
- Paolo Bertoli (1908–2001), Italian Catholic cardinal
- Pierangelo Bertoli (1942–2002), Italian singer-songwriter
- Sara Bertoli (born 1979), Italian modern pentathlete
- Scott Bertoli (born 1977), Canadian ice hockey player
- Sebastián Bertoli (born 1977), Argentine footballer

== See also ==
- Bertolí, Spanish footballer (Inocencio Bertolín Izquierdo)
- Bertol (surname)
- Bertolli (disambiguation)
- Bertolo
- Bertolini
- Bertoloni
