= Bertolacci =

Bertolacci (pronounced [bertoˈlattʃi]) is an Italian surname, originating from the given name Bertolo. Notable people with the surname include:

- Anthony Bertolacci (1776–1833), Auditor General of British Ceylon
- Andrea Bertolacci (born 1991), Italian footballer
- Lauren Bertolacci (born 1985), Australian volleyball player

== See also ==
- Bartolocci
- Bartolucci
- Bertolucci (surname)
