= Bartolo =

Bartolo may refer to:

== People with that name ==
- Bartolo (given name)
- Bartolo (surname)

== Other uses ==
- Bartolo, California
- Bartolo (peak), the highest mountain in the Desert de les Palmes Mountains, close to Castelló, Spain
- Dr. Bartolo, a figure in Pierre Beaumarchais' plays The Barber of Seville and The Marriage of Figaro

== See also ==
- Bartholomew
- Saint Bartholomew
- San Bartolo (disambiguation)
- Bortolo (disambiguation)
