= San Bartolo =

San Bartolo is the Spanish name for Saint Bartholomew. In Spanish speaking countries it is often used as part of placenames, including:

- San Bartolo Coyotepec, in Oaxaca, Mexico
- San Bartolo Soyaltepec, in Oaxaca, Mexico
- San Bartolo Tutotepec, in Hidalgo, Mexico
- San Bartolo Yautepec, in Oaxaca, Mexico
- San Bartolo, Totonicapán, in Guatemala
- San Bartolo (Maya site) near Tikal in Guatemala
- San Bartolo District, in the Lima Province, Peru
- San Bartolo, Veraguas, Panama
- San Bartolo (Mexico City Metrobús), a BRT station in Mexico City

== See also ==
- Bartolo (disambiguation)
- Bartolo Longo, a Catholic saint known as Saint Bartolo
