= Joseph Mazzinghi =

British composer (1765 - 1844)

Joseph Mazzinghi (25 December 1765 – 15 January 1844) was a British composer.

== Biography ==
He was descended from an ancient Corsican family, the eldest son of Tommaso (Thomas) Mazzinghi (d. Old St. Pancras 1775), a wine merchant settled in London. According to Cansick, the composer's father, was violinist at Marylebone Gardens. A Tommaso Mazzinghi composed and published six solos for the violin, London, 1763.

Mazzinghi was born on 25 December 1765. His mother's sister, Cassandra Frederich (afterwards Mrs. Wynne), a pianist, interested herself in his musical training, and he was a pupil of Johann Christian Bach, and later of Bertolini, Antonio Sacchini, and Pasquale Anfossi. At the age of ten, he became organist to the Portuguese Chapel (1775). He is said to have held the post of composer and director of music at the Italian opera from 1785 to 1792.

== Career ==
He may have assisted the advertised directors, Pasquale Anfossi and Luigi Cherubini, at the King's Theatre, Haymarket, but it was not until 9 January 1787, that his connection with the theatre was advertised, when Cimarosa's ‘Giannina e Bernardone’ was announced, ‘under the direction of Signor Mazzinghi,’ for 9 Jan. 1787. Several songs in the pasticcio were by him. On 8 December 1787, Paisiello's ‘Il Re Teodoro in Venezia’ was performed, with Mazzinghi, who had supplied some of the music, at the harpsichord. While holding the office Mazzinghi was not only responsible for alterations of and additions to various Italian operas, but brought out several ballets: ‘L'Amour et Pasiche’ on 6 March 1788, ‘Sapho et Phaon,’ ‘Eliza,’ and others. He remained at his post until the King's Theatre was burnt down on 17 June 1789.

In 1791, he was director of the Pantheon, the managers of which had succeeded in securing the one license granted for Italian opera. The Pantheon was, in its turn, destroyed by fire on 14 Jan. 1792. On 1 March, Mazzinghi conducted at the ‘Little Theatre in the Haymarket,’ called then Theatre Royal, Paisiello's ‘La Locanda.’ He had reconstructed the opera, the score of which had been lost in the fire. The new King's Theatre, Haymarket, opened for Italian opera under other direction in 1793.

In the meantime, Mazzinghi had set music to Merry's comic opera, ‘The Magician no Conjuror,’ produced at Covent Garden on 2 February 1792. Other English operas by Mazzinghi were: ‘A Day in Turkey,’ 1791; ‘The Wife of Two Husbands,’ 1803; ‘The Exile,’ the Covent Garden company acting at the Opera House, 1808; ‘Free Knights,’ with the popular duet, ‘When a little farm we keep,’ 1810; and in collaboration with Reeve, who wrote the lighter airs, ‘Ramah Droog,’ 1798; ‘The Turnpike Gate,’ 1799; ‘Paul and Virginia,’ 1800; ‘The Blind Girl,’ 1801; and ‘Chains of the Heart,’ which gave much pleasure to George III, 1802.

Mazzinghi's concertanti were played at the Professional Concerts (Pohl, Haydn in London), and his miscellaneous compositions were popular, especially those for the pianoforte. He taught the pianoforte to many influential pupils, among them the Princess of Wales, afterwards Queen Caroline. He was entrusted with the arrangement of the concerts at Carlton House, and of the Nobility concerts, established in 1791, and held on Sunday evenings at private houses. For fifty-six years Mazzinghi was a member of the Royal Society of Musicians. In about 1790 he entered into partnership with the firm of Goulding, D'Almaine, & Co., who published all his music after that date.

Visiting Italy in 1834, Mazzinghi recovered the title of count. On his return to England he retired to Bath. He died on 15 January 1844, at Downside College, where he had been on a visit to his son. He was buried with some pomp in the vault of the Chelsea catholic church on 25 January.

== Works ==
Besides the stage-pieces mentioned above, Mazzinghi published between seventy and eighty pianoforte sonatas; upwards of two hundred airs, &c., for pianoforte, and as many for harp and other instruments; thirty-five or more vocal trios, of which ‘The Wreath’ is still remembered; and a number of songs. A full list of his music is given in the ‘Dictionary of Musicians,’ 1827. Much of this mass of work, produced with apparent ease, was musicianly; but the flowing melodies were seldom strikingly original.
