= Margarita Trlin =

Argentine architect (born 1955)

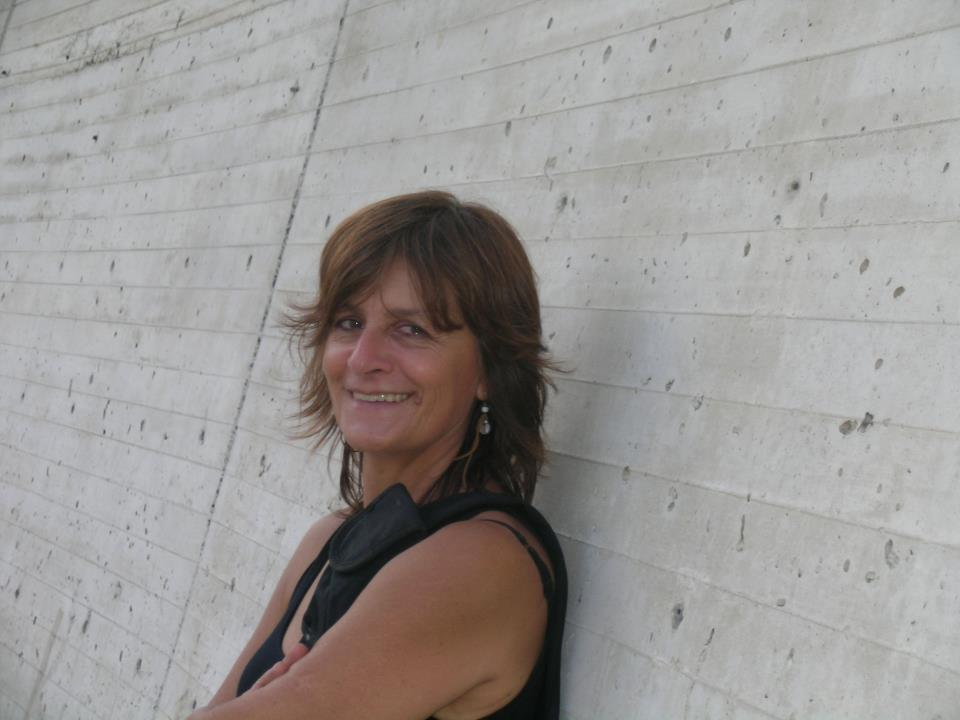
- Born: 2 April 1955 (age 71); Diadema Argentina, Argentina
- Occupation: Architect
- Spouse: Rubén Edgardo Cabrera (1983–present)
- Practice: Cabrera-Trlin
- Buildings: Casa Las colinas (1996); UNER Faculty of Education Sciences (1998); Viale Normal School (1999); Casa NZ (2007)

Margarita Trlin (born 2 April 1955) is an Argentine architect.

== Early years ==
Margarita Trlin was born on 2 April 1955 in Diadema Argentina, now in the municipality of Comodoro Rivadavia.

At age 8 she moved with her family to Paraná, Entre Ríos. In 1973 she enrolled in the National University of Córdoba's Faculty of Architecture, where she remained until 1975, when she transferred to the Catholic University of Córdoba. During the Dirty War in August 1976 she was detained, held for a time in Córdoba, and later in Villa Devoto, Buenos Aires. At the Campo de la Ribera clandestine detention center she was subjected to harsh interrogation, including physical and mental torture. She was released in March 1977 by a decree of the Executive Power, after more than seven months of captivity.

In 1979 she enrolled at the Catholic University of Santa Fe, where she finished her studies in 1981. In parallel she worked in the studios of the architects Juan Cura and Jorge Boeykens and, later, in the ARTEC studio formed by Walter Grand, Máximo Melhem, and Román Stur. There she met architecture student Rubén Cabrera in 1980. After graduating, they got married in 1983, the year in which they also founded the Cabrera-Trlin architecture studio.

== Career ==
Trlin and Cabrera worked for the construction company Vidogar, where they planned collective housing buildings for the Raúl Alfonsín government's Reactivación operation. The studio grew over time through competitions and educational works, such as the UNER Faculty of Education Sciences (1998) and the Viale Normal School (1999).

In 1991 she began teaching at the National University of the Littoral's Faculty of Architecture, at the invitation of Máximo Melhem, working on the theme of school design. In 1994 she joined the Ministry of Education, Science, and Technology as a consultant for the "CENIE 98 School Infrastructure Census", carrying out design, analysis, and diagnosis of the existing infrastructure. Her work at the ministry led her to deepen her research on architecture for education, and in 1998 she completed a postgraduate course in educational infrastructure at the University of Buenos Aires.

From 2005 to 2008, Trlin was responsible for the "PROMEDU Program" at the Ministry of Education's School Infrastructure Directorate and the "700 Schools National Program", which was financed by the Inter-American Development Bank.

In December 2014 her master's thesis was approved, titled Espacios escolares innovadores: arquitecturas para la educación en la formación de posgrado (Innovative School Spaces: Architectures for Education in Postgraduate Training). She directs teams of university volunteers, interuniversity networks, and research related to the subject. For this activity, together with Rubén Cabrera and María Silvia Serra, she received the 2014 Arquisur Research Award in the Trained Researcher category.

== Awards and distinctions ==
- 2011: 2nd ARQ Award, NEA region, for the Casa NZ
- 2012: 1st place in the ideas competition for the enhancement of Mansilla Square in Paraná
- 2014: Arquisur Research Award in the Trained Researcher category
- 2014: 2nd place in the preliminary project contest for the new temple of Chajarí
- 2022: Konex Award together with Rubén Cabrera, for their work in architecture in the last decade.

== See also ==
- List of solved missing person cases (1970s)
