= Bertoldi =

Bertoldi is an Italian surname. Notable people with the surname include:

- Alberto Bertoldi (born 1955), Italian painter
- Aldo Bertoldi (born 1961), Swiss racewalker
- Carlos Augusto Bertoldi or simply Ticão (born 1985), Brazilian footballer
- Giovanni de Bertoldi, O.F.M. (died 1445), Roman Catholic prelate and Bishop of Fano
- Giovanni Bertoldi da Serravalle (c. 1350 – 1445), Italian Franciscan and humanist, bishop of Fermo and bishop of Fano
- Luigi Bertoldi (1920–2001), Italian socialist politician
- Marilina Bertoldi (born 1988), Argentine musician
- Piergiorgio Bertoldi (born 1963), Catholic archbishop and Apostolic Nuncio of the Holy See
- Tanya Bertoldi (born 1986), Argentine politician
