= Mónica Bertolino =

Argentinean architect

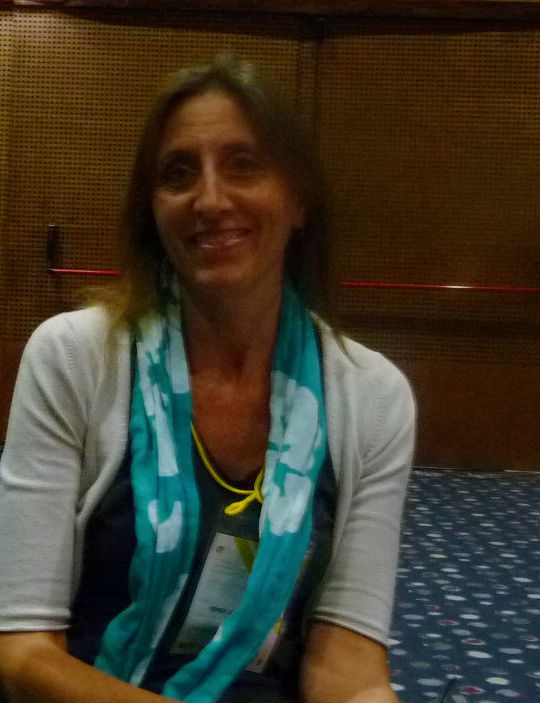

Mónica Bertolino (born July 12, 1957) is an Argentinean architect and professor of architecture. She also owns and operates Estudio Bertolino-Barrado, an architecture studio with locations in Argentina, and Spain. The studio obtained the Diploma to the Merit - Architecture (2002-2006), for Visual Arts at the Konex Awards in 2012.

== Biography ==
Mónica Bertolino was born in Córdoba, Argentina. Her father was an architect. She entered the Faculty of Architecture and Urbanism, of the National University of Córdoba during the last year of the Taller Total, graduating in 1981. She completed her postgraduate studies from the Catholic University of Córdoba, where she later taught. Since 1984, Bertolino has taught at several national schools of architecture, including the Littoral National University in Santa Fe, Argentina.

At the studio of architect and urbanist Miguel Ángel Roca, she met Carlos Barrado, together with whom she co-founded the Bertolino Barrado Architecture Firm, which has received awards.

Since 2009, together with architect Margarita Trlin, Bertolino has coordinated RedSur, a Latin-American interchange network.

== Awards and recognition ==
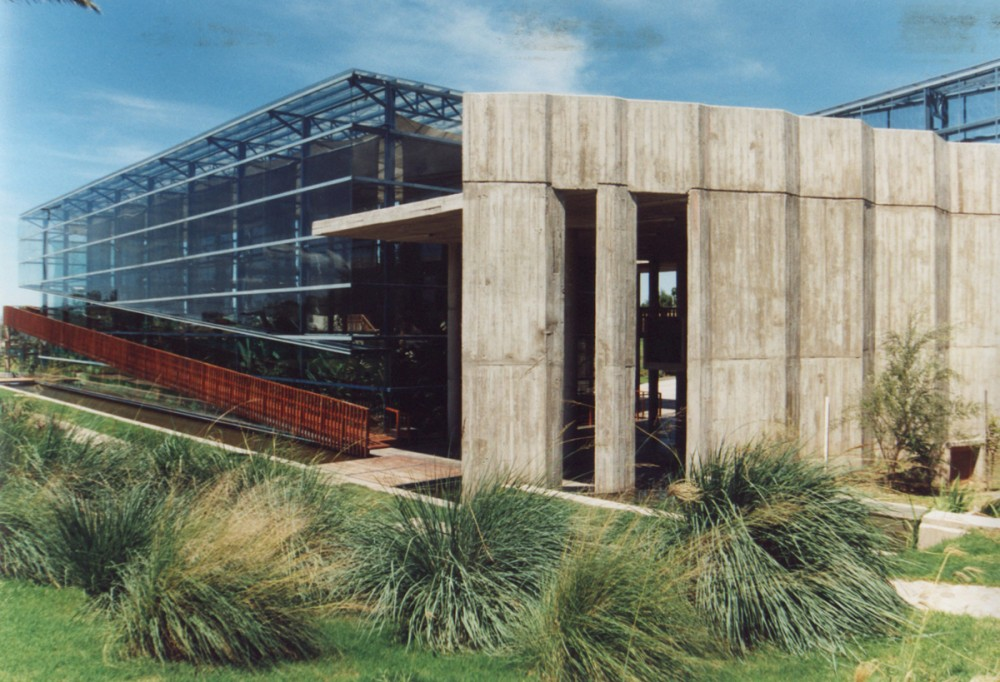
Jardín Botánico de Córdoba

- 2002: Vitruvio Award of the MNBA.
- 2002: Honorable Mention in the Bienal Panamericana de Quito with the Jardín botánico de la municipalidad de Córdoba.
- 2010: Prize in the Bienal Iberoamericana de Arquitectura y Urbanismo Panorama de Obras for the Farm at Capilla del Monte (BIAU).
- 2011: 3rd prize in the ARQ Clarín Awards for the urban project Pasarela Las Varillas and Honorable Mention for the works Casas Múltiples and Casa en Potrero de Garay.
- 2012: Diploma to the Merit - Architecture 2002-2006 in Visual Arts at the Konex Awards.

== Bibliography ==
- Adria, Miquel. New Latin American Landscape Arquitecture, 2009. ISBN 9788425223099. Nasisbooks
- Montaner, Josep Maria. Arquitectura y crítica en Latinoamérica. Nobukosa, 2011
- Gómez Luque, Mariano. Doce arquitectos contemporáneos. Nobukosa, 2011
