= Carlo Giuseppe Imbonati =

Italian Cistercian scholar

Dom Carlo Giuseppe Imbonati OCist
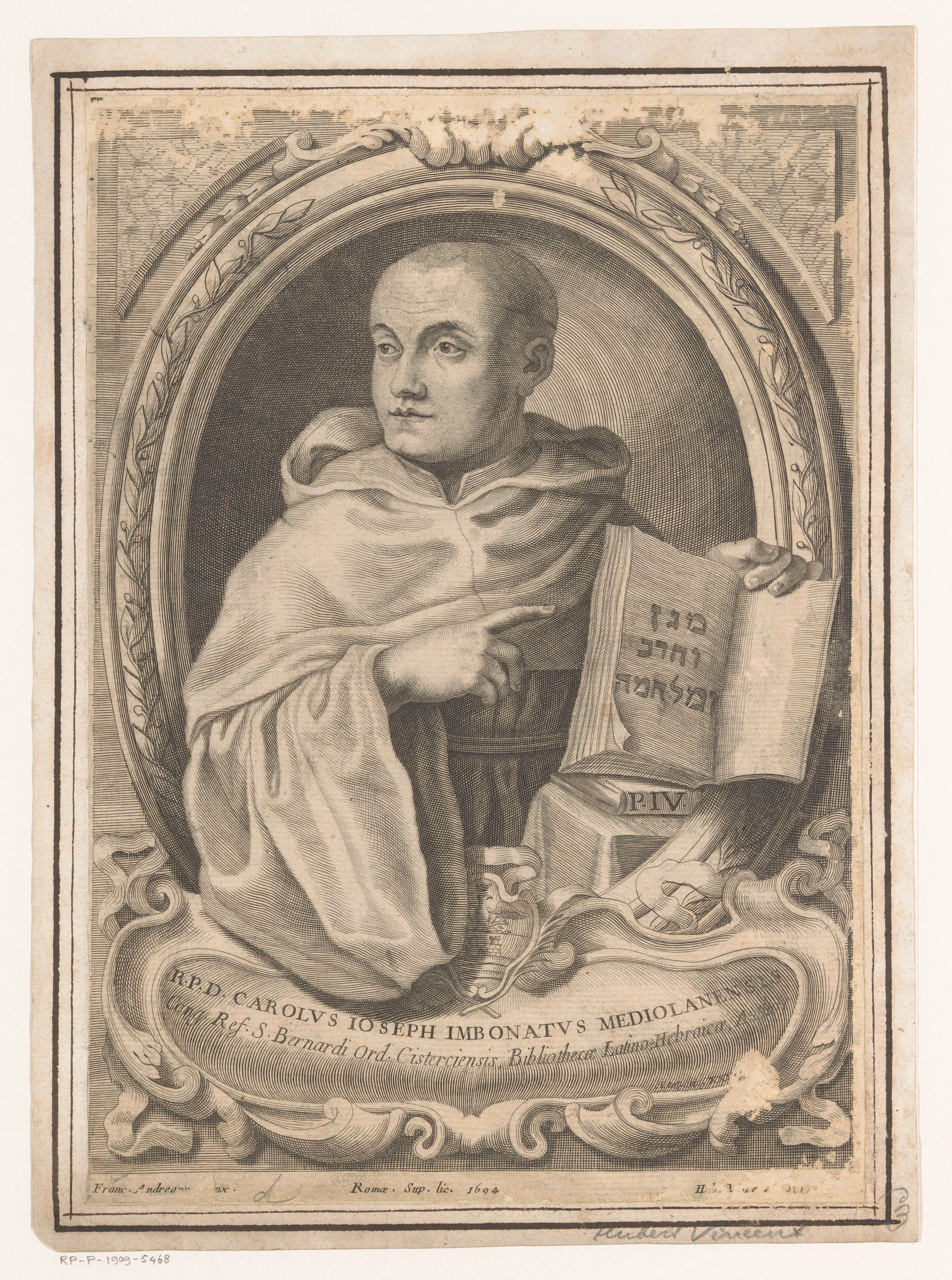
- Carlo Giuseppe Imbonati
- Title: abbot

Personal life
- Born: Milan, Duchy of Milan
- Died: 1697 Rome, Papal States
- Known for: Bibliotheca Latino-Hebraica (1694)
- Occupation: Monk, theologian and Hebrew scholar

Religious life
- Religion: Roman Catholicism
- Order: Cistercians

Carlo Giuseppe Imbonati OCist (Latin: Imbonatus) was a Cistercian scholar who was active during the last half of the 17th century. He spent much of his career in Rome and rose to the title of abbot. He was a theologian and a Hebrew scholar who wrote prolifically in his fields. The last known references to the man are dated in 1696.

== Life ==
He was born at Milan. He occupied the chairs of theology and Hebrew in Rome and was raised to the dignity of abbot.

== Works ==
A former pupil of Giulio Bartolocci, who was a member of the same order and projector of the Bibliotheca magna rabbinica, Imbonati eventually became his master's collaborator. When Bartolocci died he completed and edited the fourth volume (Rome 1693) of this work, which laid the foundation for Johann Christoph Wolf's Bibliotheca hebræa and other works. Imbonati brought out a supplementary fifth volume under the title Bibliotheca latino-hebraica, sive de Scriptoribus latinis, qui ex diversis nationibus contra Judaeos vel de re hebraica utcumque scripsere (Rome, 1694). This volume also contains a "Chronology of Sacred Scripture" and two dissertations (on the Messiah, and on the Divinity and Humanity of Christ) based upon miscellaneous Hebrew, Greek, and Latin writings.

Imbonati's Chronicon Tragicum, sive de eventibus tragicis Principum (Rome, 1696) was a didactic work. The dedicatory letter, prefixed to this work and addressed to Cardinal Coelestinus Sfondratus, O.S.B., is dated from San Bernardo alle Terme, the monastery in the Baths of Diocletian, 1 April 1696. This is the latest date known concerning Imbonati.

== Sources ==
- Vitti, Alfredo (1933). "IMBONATI, Carlo Giuseppe". Enciclopedia Italiana. Rome: Istituto dell'Enciclopedia Italiana.
