= Bertolli (disambiguation) =

Bertolli is a brand of Italian food products. It may also refer to:

== People ==
- Francesca Bertolli, an Italian contralto of the 18th century
- Paul Bertolli, a chef, writer, and artisan food producer in the San Francisco Bay

== See also ==
- Bertoli
