= Our Lady of Pompeii Novena =

Catholic devotion

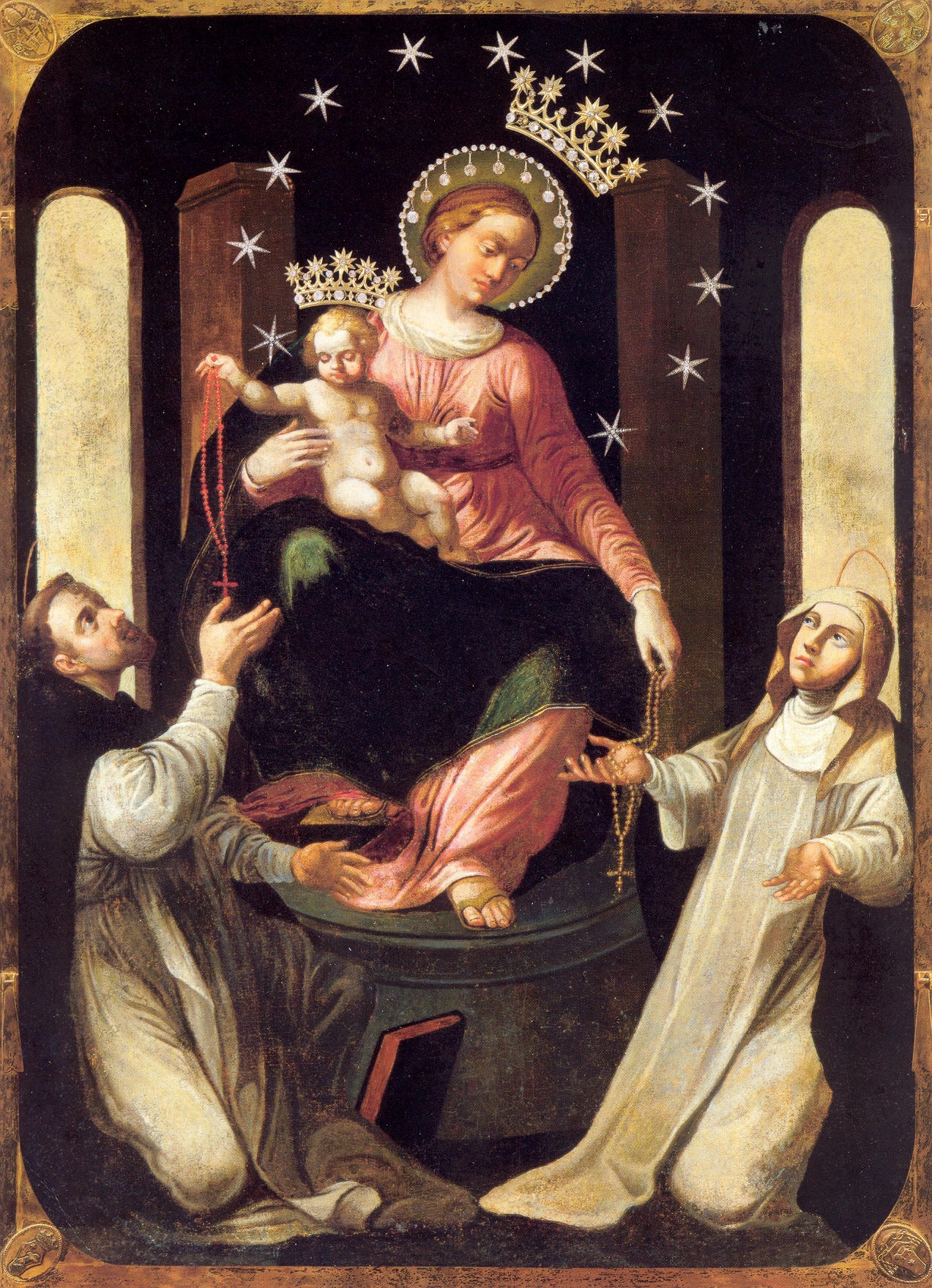
Painting of our Lady of the Rosary venerated in Pompeii.

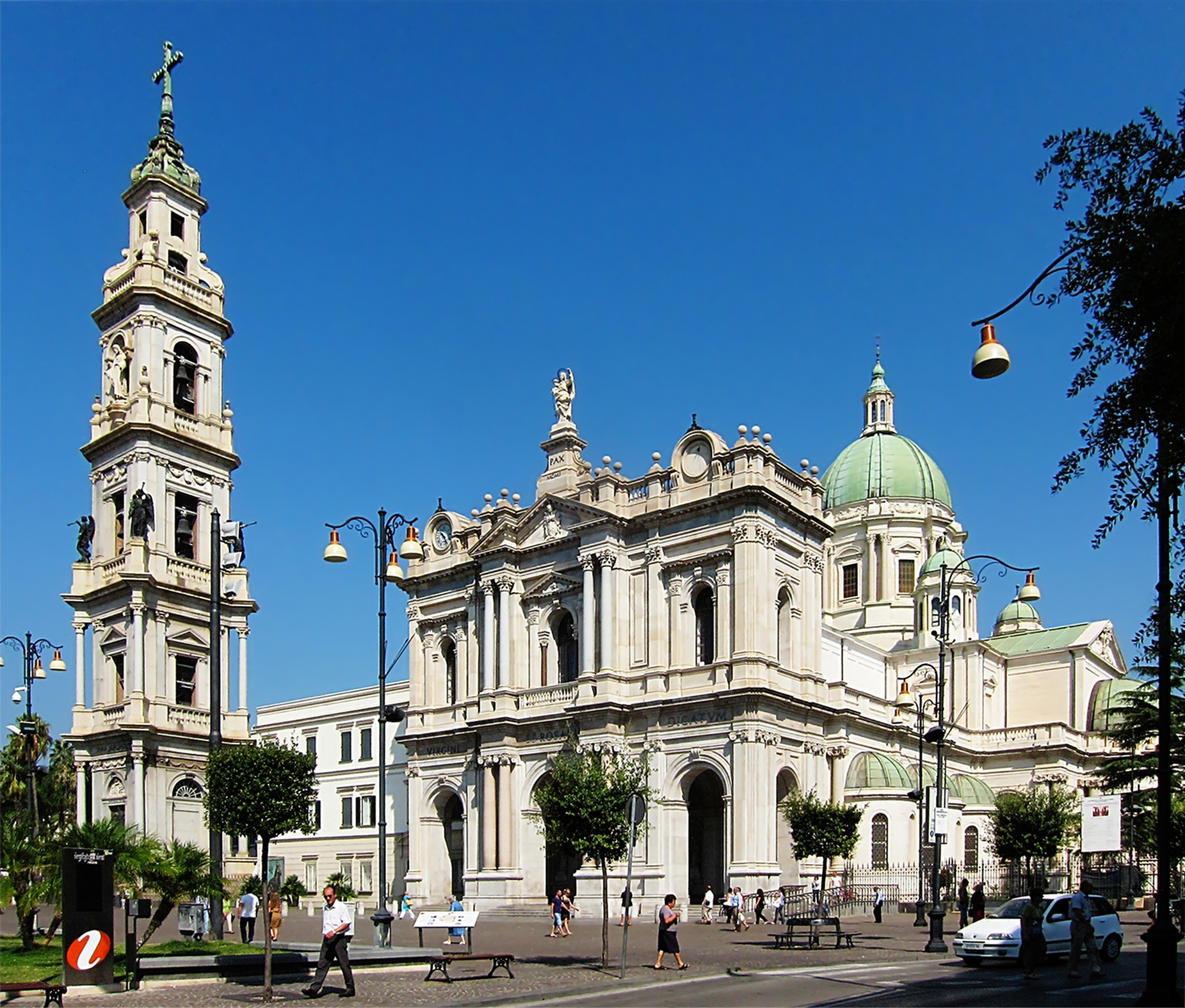
Shrine of the Virgin of the Rosary of Pompei

The Our Lady of Pompeii Novena, also referred to as The Irresistible Novena is a Novena that involves praying 15 decades of the rosary for 54 consecutive days. It was originally written in 1879 by Saint Bartolo Longo.

== History ==
Saint Bartolo Longo wrote the original "Novena d’Impetrazione" when he was gravely ill with Typhoid fever in 1879. He is said to have recovered miraculously thanks to the intervention of Mary, mother of Jesus and Catherine of Siena.

In 1884, A young, incurably ill girl from Naples called Fortuna Agrelli, who had for 13 months endured immense pain and was deemed a "hopeless cause" by her doctors, had supposedly experienced a Marian apparition, in which Mary, sitting on a throne with Infant Jesus in her lap and a rosary in her hand, told her to make three novenas of the prayers of the Rosary in petition, and later three novenas in thanksgiving and she will "obtain all". After completing six novenas, each lasting 9 days adding up to 54 days, the girl was cured.
