= Bertold Eisner =

Dr. Bertold Eisner
- Born: 1875; Korolówka, Austro-Hungarian Monarchy, (now Poland)
- Died: 27 July 1956 (aged 81); Zagreb, SFR Yugoslavia (now Croatia)
- Occupation: Law professor

Bertold Eisner (1875 – 27 July 1956) was a Croatian Jewish law professor at the University of Zagreb, pioneer of the Croatian Jurisprudence and writer.

== Biography ==
Eisner was born in Korolówka, Galicia in 1875. In Černovice, Bohemia, he finished high school and graduated from the Faculty of Law. In 1899, Eisner received his doctoral degree in law. After his education he moved to Vienna, where he worked as a court clerk. In the mid 1900, due to financial difficulties, Eisner moved to Bosnia and Herzegovina, where he worked at the Travnik, Jajce, Prijedor and Ključ courts of law. In 1933, Eisner was elected as a regular professor at University of Zagreb, Faculty of Law. He taught Roman and international private law.

During World War II, Independent State of Croatia officials excluded Eisner from the inflicted measures against the Jews, thus excluding him from wearing the star of David Yellow badge. In January 1943, he was retired in the latest retirement wave of Jewish professors. After the war, Eisner was returned to his position at the University of Zagreb. He retired in 1955, but stayed working as a part-time professor.

Eisner's scientific work was essential for the diversity of matter he had worked on. He had published many articles, debates, book ratings and displays. His area of expertise was primarily a civil right, but he was also involved with family law, international private law, commercial law, copyright law, and Roman law. Eisner published a total of 60 scientific works. His life's work was book "Private International Law", published in 1953 and 1956. He had the significant contribution to the legislative work. From 1924 to 1933, Eisner actively participated in the drafting of a new laws. All the major legislative drafts of that time (especially those in the field of civil law) passed his control and in large part are the result of his work. After the war he worked as a member of the committees in charge with the production of a series of important legislative proposals. Eisner participated in many international conferences about law.

As an accomplished scientist, Eisner enjoyed the undivided respect of his colleagues, admirers and students. He was a selfless benefactor, as he left all his possessions and property to the poor students foundation. Eisner was buried at the Mirogoj Cemetery.

== Books ==
- Eisner, Bertold (1934). Privatno-pravni položaj žene po današnjem pravu Jugoslavije i njegovo uređenje u jedinstvenom Građanskom zakoniku za Jugoslaviju [Private Legal Position of Women in Today's Yugoslav Law and its Regulation in the Unique Civil Code for Yugoslavia] (in Croatian). Zagreb: Globus.
- Eisner, Bertold (1936). Das Eherecht im jugoslawischen Vorentwurf und im tscheckoslowakischen Entwurf eines bürgerlichen Gesetzbuches: eine vergleichende Betrachtung als Beitrag zur Würdigung dieser Entwürfe [The Marriage Law in the Yugoslav and the Czechoslovak Preliminary Draft of a Civil Code: a Comparative Study to Contribute the Assessment of this Draft] (in German). Ljubljana: Jugoslovanska tiskarna.
- Eisner, Bertold (1937). Kako da se u novom građanskom zakoniku uredi pravni položaj vanbračne djece [How to Provide the Legal Position of Illegitimate Children in the New Civil Code] (in Croatian). Belgrade: Privrednik.
- Eisner, Bertold; Pliverić, Mladen (1937). Mišljenja o predosnovi Građanskog zakonika za Kraljevniu Jugoslaviju [Opinions on Prerequisite of the Civil Code for the Kingdom of Yugoslavia] (in Croatian). Zagreb: Pravničko društvo.
- Eisner, Bertold (1951). Međunarodna plaćanja u materijalnom i međunarodnom privatnom pravu kapitalističkih država [International Payments in Financial and Private International Law of Capitalist States] (in Croatian). Zagreb: Izdavački zavod Jugoslavenske akademije znanosti i umjetnosti.
- Eisner, Bertold; Horvat, Marijan (1948). Rimsko pravo [The Roman Law] (in Croatian). Zagreb: Nakladni zavod Hrvatske.
- Eisner, Bertold (1950). Porodično pravo [The Family Law] (in Croatian). Zagreb: Nakladni zavod Hrvatske.
- Eisner, Bertold (1956). Međunarodno privatno pravo [Private International Law] (in Croatian). Zagreb: Školska knjiga.

== Bibliography ==
- Goldstein, Ivo (2001). Holokaust u Zagrebu. Zagreb: Novi Liber. ISBN 953-6045-19-2.
