= Giovanni Giuda Giona Battista =

Convert from Judaism to Catholicism and agent for the king of Poland

Giovanni Giuda Giona Battista was a convert from Judaism to Catholicism and agent for the king of Poland. His original name was Jehuda Jona Ben-Isaac.

== Biography ==
Born of Jewish parents at Safed in Galilee, on 28 October 1588; died at Rome, 26 May 1668. As a Jewish rabbi he undertook an extensive journey through Europe, and it was during his stay in Poland that he was converted to Catholicism. After his conversion he was sent by the King of Poland on a mission to Constantinople, where he was arrested as a spy, and narrowly escaped with his life though the intervention of the ambassador of Venice. Later he went to Italy, where he taught Hebrew and Aramaic at the Academy of Pisa and then at the Propaganda at Rome. He was also later one of the Vatican librarians.

Among his pupils was Giulio Bartolocci, who is indebted to his learned master for the idea and plan of his famous work Bibliotheca Magna Rabbinica. Battista's principal work was the translation of the Gospels from Latin into Hebrew, published, with a preface by Clement IX (to whom it was also dedicated), at Rome, 1668.
