= Alberto Bertoldi =

Italian painter (born 1955)

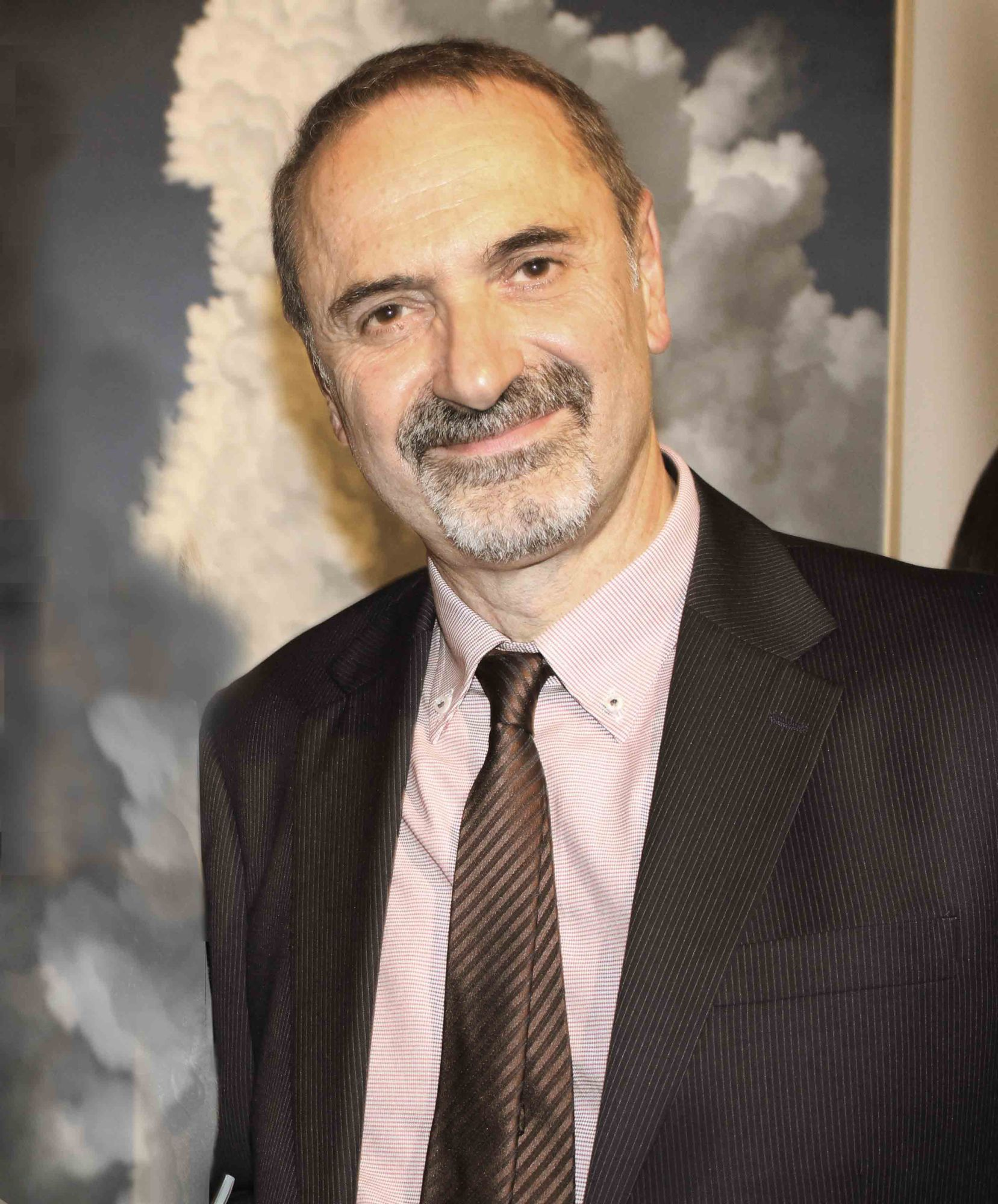
The Italian painter Alberto Bertoldi

Alberto Bertoldi (born 29 November 1955 in Luserna San Giovanni) is an Italian painter.

== Biography ==
Alberto Bertoldi was born in 1955 in Luserna San Giovanni, in Turin area. In his childhood he lived in the mountains of the Canavese and then in Piacenza Apennines. He attended technical schools and devoted himself to painting. After secondary school, Bertoldi got married and started working while still studying. He met surrealist artist Leone Garriano, whose landscapes and references to classical painting he particularly admires. Thanks to him, he prepared his first solo-artist exhibition in 1973. Encouraged by Gino Moro from the Brera Academy, he started attending the Nude School. In the following years he taught in high schools but at the age of 37, Bertoldi decided to give up teaching to devote himself entirely to painting.

== Painter career ==
"Baroque Clouds. They fan in multicolored layers – blue, purple, gray, gold – where we can effortless imagine that fantastic worlds inhabited by ethereal entities can hide."

— Arté 323 July 2000

"The particular poem of cumulonimbus clouds, the ineffability of that mixture of soft shapes and colors that often counterpoints the enormous energy and violence of phenomena, is at the center of the pictorial work of Alberto Bertoldi."

— Roberto Ranieri on Meteolive, September 2003

In the early 1990s he opens a studio in Piacenza. The 1996 opens with his first solo-artist exhibition nearly entirely consisting of landscapes. The clouds become the real protagonists of his paintings: he becomes the "pittore delle nuvole" ("cloud painter"). In this period he works with the Bugno Art Gallery in Venice; in 1998 the Braga Art Gallery in Piacenza mounts an extensive solo-artist exhibition of his works. In January 2000 the Bugno Art Gallery organizes an extensive solo-artist exhibition of his works. In the same year UN Ambassador Gerti Tauchhammer organizes the "Society Redaktionfest" in Vienna and Bertodi's works are exhibited along with those by artist Ernst Fuchs in an important exhibition. The year 2006 is characterized by an extensive retrospective exhibition, edited by Beatrice Buscaroli, at the Museo di Villa Breda, in Padua. The catalogue includes, among others, texts by Ruggero Pierantoni, Luca Mercalli, Gherardo degli Azzoni Avogadro, Maurizio Agnellini and poet Alda Merini. Numerous exhibitions follow: a solo-artist exhibition at the London Great Art Fair, a retrospective exhibition at the Museo-Fondazione "Un Paese". He exhibits his works at the Edinburgh Art Gallery and at the Dallas Hermitage Gallery. From 2010 his activity abroad focuses on the exclusive collaboration with the Galerie de l'Europe in Paris, which also organizes an important solo-artist exhibition of his works. In Italy Bertoldi takes part in specialist exhibitions and he regularly mounts exhibitions at the Mantua Einaudi Gallery, at the Sovilla Bookshop in Cortina and at the Galleria delle Visioni in Piacenza. In 2011 he takes part in the Venice Biennale, supervised by Vittorio Sgarbi, in the Emilia-Romagna section. In 2014 Bertoldi and his works are cited by the Italian meteorologist and climatologist Luca Mercalli, during the RAI show "Che tempo che fa".
In May 2016 a cloudscape created for the London Christian Dior's Showroom has been installed, wanted by the architect Peter Marino.

== Prizes and awards ==
- 1998 Etruria Arte, award at the ninth Exhibition of contemporary art
- 1999 Etruria Arte, award at the tenth Exhibition of contemporary art
- 2011 Venice Biennale, participation in the regional section Emilia Romagna

== Major exhibitions (2010–2016) ==
- 2010 Group Exhibition. Galerie de l'Europe – Paris.
- 2010 Solo Artist Exhibition. Hermitage Antiques – Dallas.
- 2011 Group Exhibition. LIV Venice Biennale Reg. section – Emilia Romagna.
- 2011 Solo Artist Exhibition. Arte fiera – Padua.
- 2011 Solo Artist Exhibition. Arte fiera – Parma.
- 2011 Solo Artist Exhibition. Galerie de L'Europe "Peintures" – Paris.
- 2012 Solo Artist Exhibition. Galleria delle Visioni – Piacenza.
- 2012 Solo Artist Exhibition. Galleria La Pietra – Martina Franca.
- 2012 Solo Artist Exhibition. Arte fiera – Genoa.
- 2013 Solo Artist Exhibition. Galleria Libreria Einaudi – Mantua.
- 2013 Solo Artist Exhibition. Arte fiera – Piacenza.
- 2014 Solo Artist Exhibition. Galleria Sala – Piacenza.
- 2015 Solo Artist Exhibition. "Clouds" A selection of paintings Moatti Masters Contemporary – London.
- 2015 Solo Artist Exhibition. Banca Profilo – Reggio Emilia.
- 2016 Solo Artist Anthological Exhibition. Galleria Museo Alberoni – Piacenza.

== Bibliography ==
- Laura Lunati (July 2000). "Alberto Bertoldi. Città fantasma e nuvole barocche". Arte.
- "Alberto Bertoldi, Mysterious Clouds". Society. 2000.
- Giorgio Soavi (2002). Fondazione Gianfranco Dioguardi (ed.). Ecco le nuvole. Bari.
- "I cieli d'autore di Bertoldi in Trentino". Libertà quotidiano di Piacenza. September 2002.
- "Alla ricerca della perla blu". Il Giornale, Quotidiano Nazionale. July 2007.
- "Trifore e cumulonembi di passaggio. Le nuvole di Alberto Bertoldi". Archived from the original on 29 May 2015.
- Alberto Bertoldi (2015). Immobili transizioni. Viadana MN.
