= Leanne Bartolo =

Maltese champion bodybuilder (born 1987)

Personal information
- Nationality: Maltese
- Born: 17 September 1987 (age 39) Maghtab, Malta
- Education: University of Malta

Sport
- Country: Malta
- Sport: Bodybuilding

Leanne Bartolo (born 17 September 1987) is a former WFF European Bikini champion. A psychology graduate and primary school teacher by profession, Bartolo is also a fully qualified fitness instructor and a certified TRX instructor. Bartolo's victory automatically elevated her to compete in the "pros" section on the same night, where she placed second. It was another accolade after placing third at the World Bikini Competition award in November 2017.
