= Joe Bartolo =

Australian rugby league footballer

Personal information
- Born: 6 November 1969 (age 57)

Playing information
- Position: Wing
Club
Years	Team	Pld	T	G	FG	P
1990–95	Parramatta Eels	56	17	0	0	68

Joe Bartolo (born 6 November 1969) is an Australian former professional rugby league footballer who played on the wing for the Parramatta Eels in the 1990s.

Bartolo made his debut for Parramatta in round 11 of the 1990 season against the Canberra Raiders. Bartolo spent five seasons at Parramatta and his final game for the club was in Round 22 of the 1995 season against the Penrith Panthers.
