= Bertolini =

Bertolini is an Italian surname. Notable people with the surname include:

- Adrián Bertolini (born 1978), Uruguayan basketball player
- Alessandro Bertolini (born 1971), cyclist
- Andrea Bertolini (born 1973), race car driver
- Christopher Bertolini, American film writer and producer
- Gioele Bertolini (born 1995), Italian cyclist
- Jack Bertolini (1934–2021), Scottish footballer
- José Elguero Bertolini (born 1934), Spanish chemist
- Luigi Bertolini (1904–1977), football player
- Mark Bertolini (born 1956), American business executive
- Massimo Bertolini (born 1974), Italian tennis player
- Michelle Bertolini (born 1994), Venezuelan tennis player
- Milena Bertolini (born 1966), Italian football player and manager
- Pietro Bertolini (1859–1920), Italian statesman
- Roberto Bertolini (born 1985), Italian javelin thrower
- Veronica Bertolini (born 1995), Italian gymnast

== See also ==
- Bertol (surname)
- Bertoli
- Bertolin
- Bertolino
- Bertolo
- Bertoloni
- Bartolini
