= Dents de Bertol =

Mountain in Switzerland

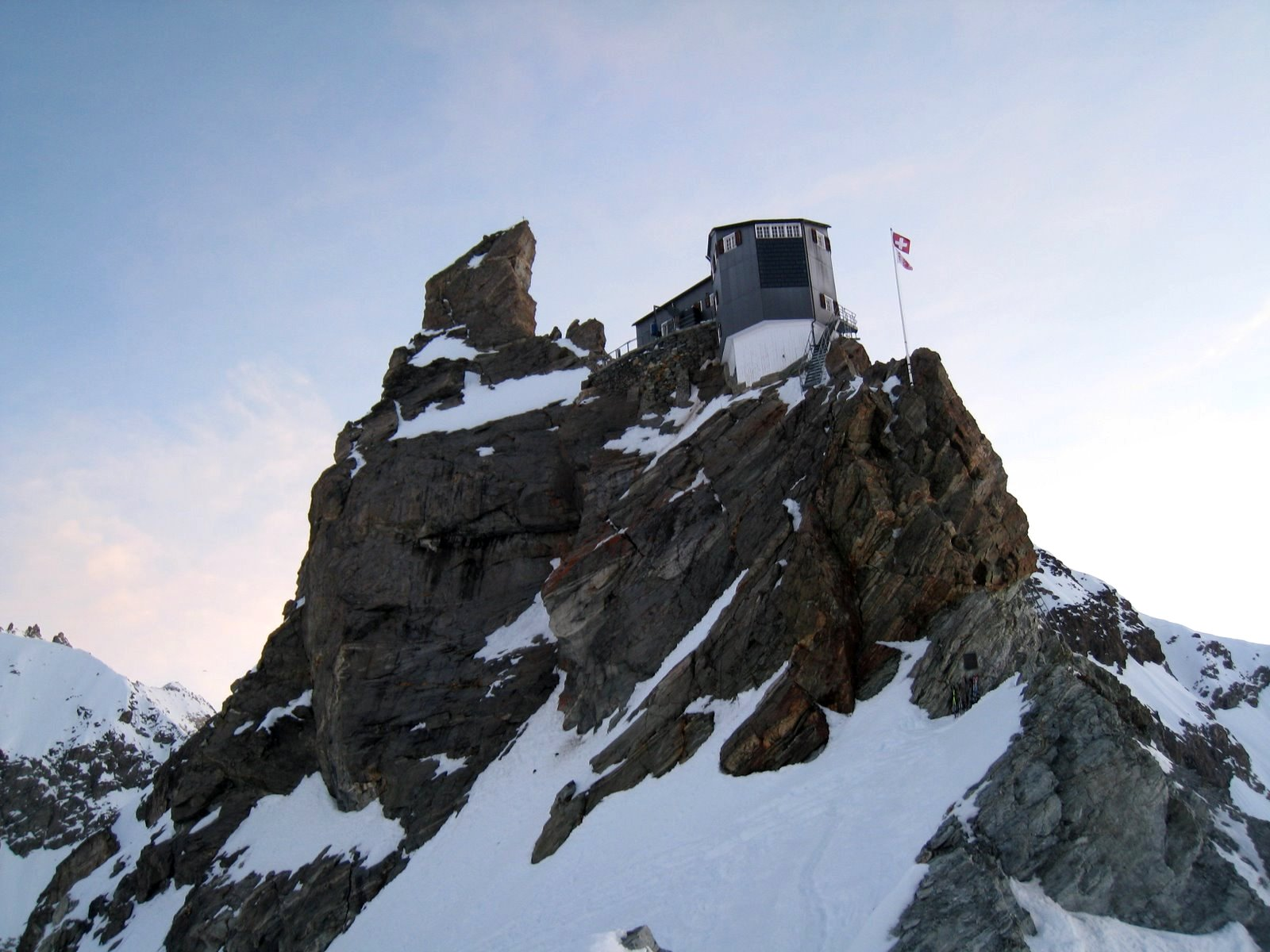

Highest point
- Elevation: 3,547 m (11,637 ft)
- Prominence: 139 m (456 ft)
- Parent peak: Bouquetins
- Listing: List of mountains of Switzerland
- Coordinates: 45°59′50.5″N 7°32′18.6″E

Geography
- Location within Switzerland
- Location: Valais, Switzerland
- Parent range: Pennine Alps

The Dents de Bertol are a multi-summited mountain of the Swiss Pennine Alps, located south of the Col de Bertol in the canton of Valais. The main summit has an elevation of 3,547 metres (11,637 ft).
