= Diadema Argentina =

Coordinates: 45°46′S 67°40′W

- Municipality and village
- Interactive map of Diadema Argentina
- Country: Argentina
- Province: Chubut Province
- Department: Escalante Department
- Time zone: UTC−3 (ART)

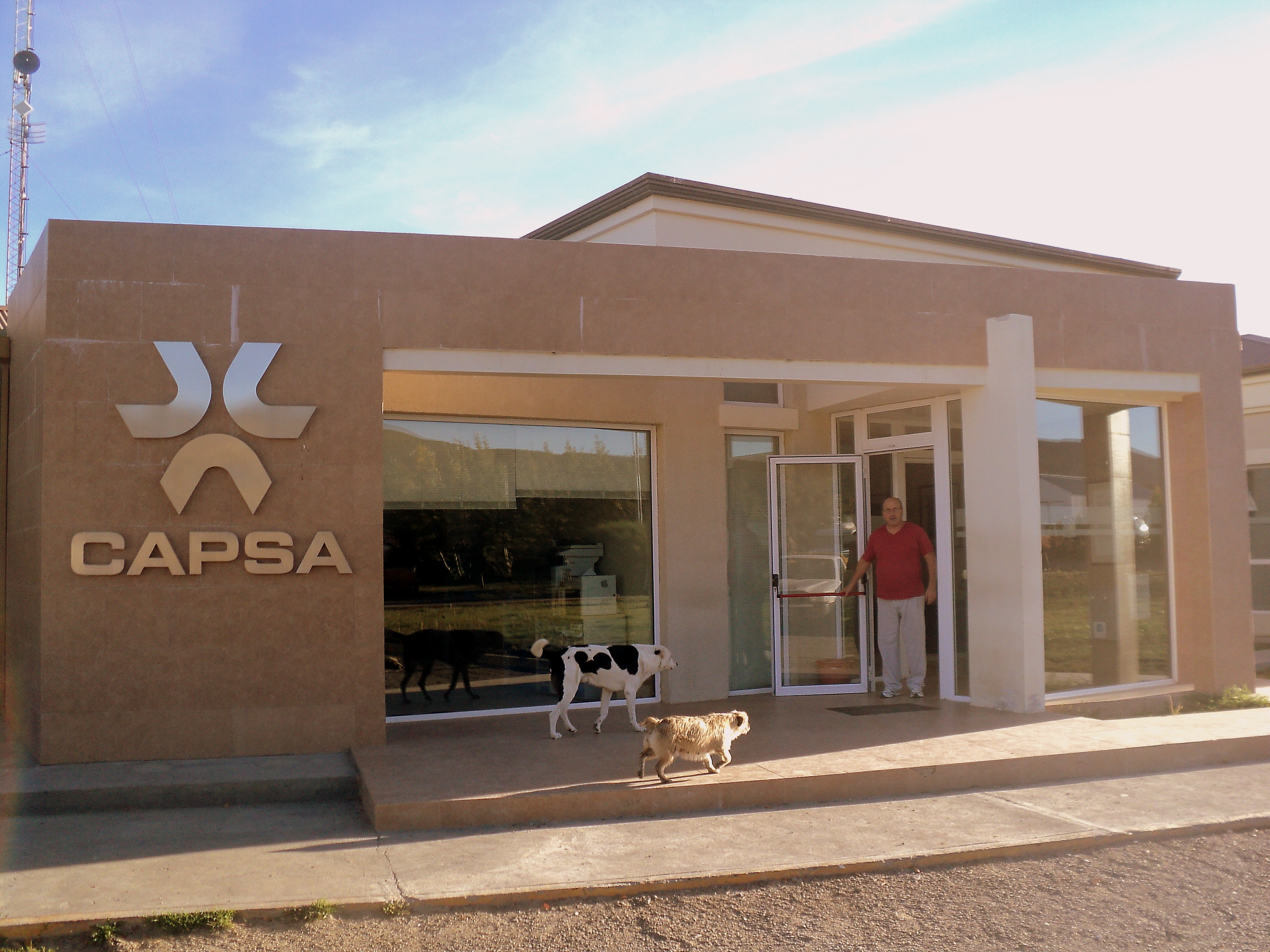

Diadema Argentina is a village and municipality in Chubut Province in southern Argentina.
