= Bertol (surname) =

Bertol is a surname. Notable people with this surname include:

- Daniela Bertol, Italian architect
- Mikel Kortina Bertol, Spanish footballer
- Paula María Bertol (born 1965), Argentinian legislator
- Roberto Bertol (1917–1990), Spanish footballer

== See also ==
- Bertoli
- Bertolini
- Bertolo
- Bertoloni
