= Ansano di Andrea di Bartolo =

Italian painter (1421–1491)

Ansano di Andrea di Bartolo (1421–1491) was an Italian painter active in Siena. After a brief spell in the late 1430s in Castiglione Olona (near Milan), as an assistant in Masolino’s workshop, he returned to Siena, where in the 1440s he quickly established himself as one of the most progressive artists in the city. This was a time when the Renaissance avant-garde of Sienese painters, headed by Domenico di Bartolo and Lorenzo Vecchietta, was eagerly assimilating the innovations of the leading Florentine artists of the early Renaissance. Following in the footsteps of the leading Florentine painters and sculptors – Masaccio, Masolino, Filippo Lippi, Lorenzo Ghiberti and Donatello – they reformed the traditional formulas of Sienese painting without breaking with their own well-established traditions. These artists permeated their old Sienese formulas and inventions with a Renaissance spirit and produced pictures of major physical substance, consequently scenes of higher empathy, and, in the case of the splendid frescoes of the it:Pellegrinaio of the Ospedale di Santa Maria della Scala in Siena, episodes embedded in fantastic architectural settings, constructed as eccentric expressions of the newly acquired rules of perspective within an artistic vocabulary of no lesser eccentricity inspired by the classical world.
