= Bertoloni =

Bertoloni is a surname. Notable people with the surname include:

- Antonio Bertoloni (1775–1869), Italian botanist with the botanical author abbreviation Bertol., father of Giuseppe
- Giuseppe Bertoloni (1804–1874), Italian botanist and entomologist with the botanical author abbreviation G.Bertol., son of Antonio

== See also ==
- Bertol (surname)
- Bertoli
- Bertolo
- Bertolini
