= Fabio Bertoli =

Italian professional footballer

Personal information
- Full name: Fabio Bertoli
- Date of birth: 20 March 1996 (age 30)
- Place of birth: Montichiari, Italy
- Height: 1.85 m (6 ft 1 in)
- Positions: Midfielder; forward

Team information
- Current team: Carpenedolo BSV Garda
- Number: 26

Youth career
- –2014: Brescia

Senior career*
Years	Team	Apps	(Gls)
2013–2017	Brescia	14	(0)
2016-2017	→ Piacenza (loan)	6	(0)
2017-2018	Prato	15	(0)
2018–2019	Desenzano Calvina Sport	24	(0)
2019–2020	Calcio Ghedi 2009	18	(2)
2020-2021	Rovato Calcio	4	(0)
2021-2024	U.S Bedizzolese	65	(16)
2024-2026	BSV Garda	61	(15)
2026-	Carpenedolo BSV Garda	4	(1)

International career
2013	Italy U17	0	(0)
2016	Italy U21	0	(0)
- * Club domestic league appearances and goals as of 11:23, 10 December 2021 (UTC)

Fabio Bertoli (born 20 August 1996) in Montichiari, is an Italian professional footballer who currently plays for Italian side Carpenedolo BSV Garda as a midfielder, and right forward.

== Club career ==
Bertoli is a youth exponent from Brescia Calcio. He made his debut on 30 August 2014 against Frosinone Calcio in a Serie B game playing almost the entire game, before being substituted after 89 minutes for Mario Gargiulo.
