= Gino Bartolucci =

Italian cyclist

Personal information
- Born: 24 May 1905
- Died: 26 February 1998 (aged 92)

Cycling career
- Sport: Cycling
- Discipline: Road
- Role: Rider

Gino Bartolucci (24 May 1905 – 26 February 1998) was an Italian racing cyclist. He rode in the 1926 Tour de France.
