= James Bertolino =

American poet (born 1942)

James Bertolino (born 1942) is an American poet.

== Biography ==
Bertolino was born in Pence, Wisconsin, near the border with Michigan. A descendant of Italian and French Canadian immigrant grandparents, he was introduced to poetry in high school by his sister, who brought him books by Allen Ginsberg, Jack Kerouac and other Beat poets from the local library; he started writing his own poems shortly thereafter.

He attended University of Wisconsin in the 1960s, and later did graduate studies at Cornell University under A. R. Ammons. He taught creative writing for 36 years at several institutions, including Cornell, University of Cincinnati, Washington State University, Western Washington University, Skagit Valley College, Edmonds Community College and Shoreline Community College. He spent a year as writer-in-residence and Hallie Ford Chair of Creative Writing at Willamette University; in 2006 he retired from teaching.

He lives with his partner, the poet and artist Anita K. Boyle, in Bellingham, Washington.

In 2007, he was awarded a Jeanne Lohmann Poetry Prize for Washington State Poets.

== Writing ==
Bertolino is the author of 30 books and chapbooks of poetry and prose, beginning in 1968 with two chapbooks, Day of Change and Drool. He was widely published from early on in his career, and over the years his work has appeared in more than 100 magazines and more than 40 anthologies.

As an editor he co-founded the literary journal Abraxas and the Cincinnati Poetry Review, as well as sitting on the editorial board of Ithaca House. In 1972 he founded Stone Marrow Press, which published his own work as well as other poets' work. He co-founded Egress Studio Press with Anita K. Boyle in 2002.

Bertolino has also long been active in Pacific Northwest poetry scenes. He participated in two of Charles Potts’s Poetry Parties in Walla Walla, WA, and wrote the introduction for A Visit to the Ranch (2015), by klipschutz (pen name of Kurt Lipschutz), a collection that featured numerous poems inspired by Potts.

== Bibliography ==
=== Poetry ===
- Day of Change. Milwaukee, WI: Gunrunner Press, 1968. (chapbook)
- Drool. Madison, WI: Quixote Press, 1968. (chapbook)
- Ceremony. Milwaukee, WI: Morgan Press, 1969. (chapbook)
- Mr. Nobody. Menomonie, WI: Ox Head Press, 1969. (chapbook)
- Becoming Human. Oshkosh, WI: Road Runner Press, 1970. (chapbook)
- Employed. Ithaca, NY: Ithaca House, 1972.
- Edging Through. Ithaca, NY: Stone Marrow Press, 1972. (chapbook)
- Soft Rock. Tacoma, WA: Charas Press, 1973. (chapbook)
- Making Space For Our Living. Port Townsend, WA: Copper Canyon Press, 1975.
- The Gestures. Providence, RI: Bonewhistle Press, 1975.
- Terminal Placebos. New York, NY: New Rivers Press, 1975. (chapbook)
- The Alleged Conception. Hanover, NH: Granite Press, 1976.
- New & Selected Poems. Pittsburgh, PA: Carnegie-Mellon University Press, 1978.
- Are You Tough Enough For The Eighties?. St. Paul, MN: New Rivers Press, 1979. (chapbook)
- Precinct Kali & The Gertrude Spicer Story. St. Paul, MN: New Rivers Press, 1982.
- 21 Poems from First Credo. Anacortes, WA: Stone Marrow Press, 1990. (chapbook)
- Like A Planet. Guemes Island, WA: Stone Marrow Press, 1993. (chapbook)
- 26 Poems from Snail River. Bellingham, WA: Egress Studio Press, 2000. (chapbook)
- Greatest Hits, 1965–2000. Johnstown, OH: Pudding House Publications, 2000. (chapbook)
- Pub Proceedings (with Anita K. Boyle). Bellingham, WA: Egress Studio Press, 2001. (chapbook)
- Pocket Animals. Bellingham, WA: Egress Studio Press, 2002.
- Bar Exams (with Anita K. Boyle). Bellingham, WA: Egress Studio Press, 2004. (chapbook)
- Finding Water, Holding Stone. Cincinnati, OH: Cherry Grove Collections, 2009.
- Every Wound Has A Rhythm. Kingston, WA: World Enough Writers, 2012.
- Lit-Wads (with Anita K. Boyle). Bellingham, WA: Egress Studio Press, 2013. (chapbook)
- Ravenous Bliss: New And Selected Love Poems. Kingston, WA: MoonPath Press, 2014.
- Galaxy in Thrall. Seattle, WA: Goldfish Press, 2019
- Sun Rising into Storm. Kingston, WA: MoonPath Press, 2021.

=== Prose ===
- Goat-Footed Turtle. Anacortes, WA: Stone Marrow Press, 1996. (chapbook)
- The Path Of Water (interview by Matthew Campbell Roberts). Bellingham, WA: Stone Marrow Press, 2008.(chapbook)

=== Anthologies edited ===
- Northwest Poets. Madison, WI: Quixote Press, 1968.
- Last Call: The Anthology of Beer, Wine & Spirits Poetry. Tillamook, OR: World Enough Writers, 2018.

== Sources ==
- Roberts, Matthew Campbell. "The Path Of Water: An Interview With James Bertolino". Cortland, NY: The Cortland Review, Winter 2007.
