= Constantino Bértolo =

Spanish publisher and writer

Constantino Bértolo (born 1946) is a Spanish publisher and writer. He studied Spanish philology at Complutense University in Madrid. He is regarded as one of the most respected literary critics in Spain, and he is also a well-known publisher and literary editor. He has written critical pieces for a variety of publications, including the magazine El Urogallo, and the newspapers El País and El Independiente.

Between 1978 and 1985, he ran the imprint Tus Libros for Anaya publishers. In the 1990s, he co-founded and directed the Escuela de letras de Madrid. Since then, he has managed the publishers Editorial Debate and Caballo de Troya, the latter a part of Penguin Random House.

He teaches at the Universidad Pompeu Fabra in Barcelona and at the Universidad de Salamanca.

He has published a number of books:

- La narrativa española entre 1975–1985 (Revista de Occidente)
- Leer ¿para qué? (Revista Educación y Bibliotecas. Madrid, 1995)
- La Edición sin editores o el capitalismo sin capitalistas (Revista Archipiélago, 2003)
- La cena de los notables
- Libro de Huelgas, revueltas y revoluciones. Editorial 451, 2009
- El Ojo crítico. Ediciones B, 2009
- Cómo se lee un libro. Editorial Alborada, 1987
