= Korolówka =

- Village
- Location within Poland
- Coordinates: 51°35′N 23°30′E
- Country: Poland
- Voivodeship: Lublin
- County: Włodawa
- Gmina: Włodawa

Korolówka [kɔrɔˈlufka] is a village in the administrative district of Gmina Włodawa, within Włodawa County, Lublin Voivodeship, in eastern Poland, close to the border with Belarus.
