= Bartolo (given name) =

Bartolo as a given name may refer to:

- Bartholomew the Apostle (St. Bartholomew), known as San Bartolo in Spanish-speaking countries
- Bartolo Colón (born 1973), Dominican baseball pitcher
- Bartolo di Fredi (1330–1410), Sienese School
- Bartolo Longo (1841–1926), Catholic saint and former Satanist priest who became a lay Dominican
- Bartolo Musil, Austrian musician
- Bartolo Portuondo (1893–1981), Cuban baseball player

== See also ==
- Bartolo (surname)
- Bartolo Nardini, Italian grappa company
