= Bartolo Musil =

Bartolo Musil is an Austrian baritone singer, composer, researcher, and University professor.

== Career ==
Trained as a composer, pianist, and singer, he has been working as a musician from childhood. He studied at the Universities of Vienna, Salzburg and Detmold. As a student he received awards and grants. He was awarded the First Prize at the International Competition “Concours de la Mélodie française” in Toulouse.

Bartolo Musil's repertoire reaches from Renaissance and early Baroque up to contemporary experimental opera.

As a concert and opera singer he has sung parts at the Chigiana Festival in Siena (Atenaide by Vivaldi, broadcast by the RAI) in the Vienna Musikverein (e.g. staged Monteverdi madrigals in the Great Hall) and Konzerthaus, the Berlin Festival, the Berlin Philharmonie (Messiah and The Creation), the Holland Belcanto Festival, the Festival of Early Music in Innsbruck, the Carinthischer Sommer festival, the Stephaniensaal Graz, the cathedrals of Berlin and Vienna, the Vienna Kammeroper and Neue Oper Wien (Le Balcon by Eötvös).

When he, after only two weeks of preparation, took on the title role of Monteverdi’s L'Orfeo in a production of the German festival “Antikenfestspiele” in Trier, he was listed in “Who’s Hot” in the magazine Opera Now.

Musil has worked with the Venice Baroque Orchestra, the Wiener Klangforum, the Ensemble Kontrapunkte, the Moscow Symphony Orchestra, the SWR-Orchester, the Orpheus Kammerorchester, the Savaria Baroque Orchestra, Armonio Tributo, and directors such as Achim Freyer. Song recitals, radio and CD productions and his cabaret duo "illie&bart" complete his activities.

In 2006 his first solo recital CD "Virtuosity - il Baritono Barocco" was published by the Italian label Bongiovanni.

As a composer Musil has written commissioned works for several venues, such as the Vienna Musikverein and Konzerthaus, the festival Carinthischer Sommer, the Jeunesses Musicales, etc., and has been awarded prizes.

== Research and Teaching ==
Musil is an artistic researcher and has completed a doctorate at the University of Music and Performing Arts, Graz. In 2015 he was appointed as a professor for Voice by the university Mozarteum in Salzburg. As from 2024, he is head of the department for voice and opera at the Music and Arts University of the City of Vienna.

== Books ==
- "Wie ein Begehren": Sprache und Musik in der Interpretation von Vokalmusik (nicht nur) des Fin de Siècle (2018, Transcript-Verlag)
