= Bartolo Longo =

Italian Catholic saint (1841–1926)

Saint Bartolo Longo TOSD, KGCHS
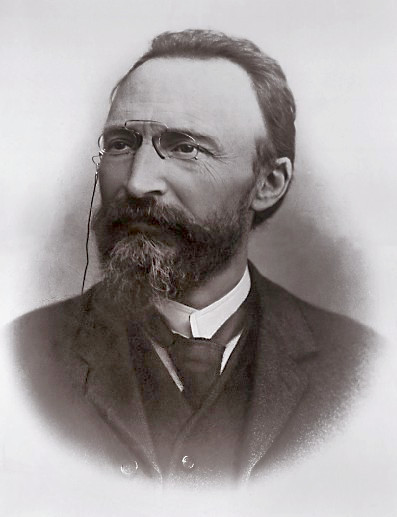
- Photograph of Longo

Confessor
- Born: 10 February 1841; Latiano, near Brindisi, Kingdom of the Two Sicilies
- Died: 5 October 1926 (aged 85); Pompei, Naples, Campania, Kingdom of Italy
- Venerated in: Catholic Church
- Beatified: 26 October 1980, Saint Peter's Basilica, Vatican City by Pope John Paul II
- Canonized: 19 October 2025, Saint Peter's Square, Vatican City by Pope Leo XIV
- Major shrine: Basilica of Our Lady of the Most Holy Rosary of Pompei, Pompei, Naples, Italy
- Feast: 5 October

Bartolo Longo, TOSD (10 February 1841 – 5 October 1926) was an Italian lawyer and former Satanic priest who returned to the Catholic faith and became a Dominican tertiary, dedicating his life to the rosary and the Virgin Mary. He was eventually awarded a papal knighthood of the Equestrian Order of the Holy Sepulchre of Jerusalem. He was canonized by Pope Leo XIV on 19 October 2025.

== Early life ==
Bartolo Longo was born into a wealthy family on 10 February 1841, in the small town of Latiano, near Brindisi, in the Kingdom of the Two Sicilies. His parents were devout Catholics. In 1851, Longo's father died, and his mother remarried a lawyer. Despite Longo's stepfather wanting him to study in order to become a teacher, Longo was set on becoming a lawyer. In 1861, Longo succeeded in convincing his stepfather and was sent to the University of Naples to study law.

In the 1860s, the Catholic Church in Italy found itself at odds with the strong nationalistic movement that inspired the cause for Risorgimento. General Giuseppe Garibaldi, who played a key role in Italian unification, saw the papacy as an antagonist to Italian nationalism and actively campaigned for the elimination of the papal office altogether. The Church in Europe was also competing with the growing popularity of Spiritualism and Occultism. Because of this, many students at the University of Naples took part in public demonstrations against the pope, believed in witchcraft, and consulted Neapolitan mediums. According to Longo, after some study and several spiritual experiences, he was ordained as a Satanic priest.

== Conversion to Catholicism ==
Longo at age 22

Over the next year, Longo apparently suffered, "with a body reduced to skin and bones, two possessed eyes, frazzled nerves, a devilish beard, and a stomach ailment doomed to accompany him for the rest of his life. … He felt an ominous presence at his side, a being that he referred to as his 'angel' … [a] dark companion." His life became one of "depression, nervousness, and confusion". One of his professors, Vincenzo Pepe, recognized the dramatic change in Longo's behaviour. The Dominican friar Alberto Radente and the religious sister Caterina Volpicelli also befriended Longo and introduced him to devotion to the Virgin Mary and the rosary. With their aid, Longo chose to abandon Satanism and return to the Catholic Church. He reportedly visited a séance and held up a rosary, declaring: "I renounce spiritualism because it is nothing but a maze of error and falsehood."

On 7 October 1871, Longo became a Dominican tertiary and took the name Rosario. He also came to know some Franciscan friars with whom he helped the poor and incurably ill. Bartolo also kept up his law practice. He went to the village of Pompei to take care of the affairs of a friend, Countess Marianna Farnararo De Fusco.

In Pompei, Longo later recounted, he was shocked at the erosion of the people's faith. He wrote: "Their religion was a mixture of superstition and popular tradition. [...] For their every need, [...] they would go to a witch, a sorceress, in order to obtain charms and witchcraft." Through talking to the citizens, Bartolo came to recognize their severe lack of catechesis. When he asked one man if there was only one God, the fellow answered: "When I was a child, I remember people telling me there were three. Now, after so many years, I don't know if one of them is dead or if one has married."

Longo was deeply troubled by the confused beliefs of the people he encountered at Pompeii. He was so depressed that he even struggled with suicidal thoughts, reminiscent of his time as a satanic. However, he remembered the Blessed Virgin's promise to Saint Dominic: "He who propagates my rosary will be saved". This promise convinced him to encourage public devotion to the rosary as a means of leading the people back to God.

== Shrine of Our Lady of Pompei ==
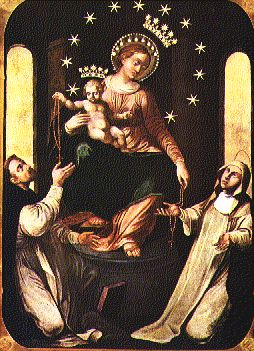
Our Lady of the Rosary with St. Dominic and St. Catherine of Siena

With the help of Countess Mariana di Fusco, he inaugurated a confraternity of the Rosary and, in October 1873, started restoring a dilapidated church. He sponsored a festival in honour of Our Lady of the Rosary.

In 1875, Longo obtained as a gift a painting portraying Our Lady of the Rosary, with Ss. Dominic and Catherine of Siena. M. Concetta de Litala, a nun of the Monastery of the Rosary at Porta Medina, had been holding it for the Dominican priest Alberto Radente. Radente had acquired it from a junk-shop dealer in Naples for a very small sum. The painting was in bad condition, and Longo wrote of his immediate distaste for the poor artistic quality when he first saw it. However, he accepted the gift to conserve funds and not to insult Concetta. Longo raised funds to restore the image and placed it in the church in an effort to encourage pilgrimages.

In 1879, Longo wrote the 54 day Novena to Our Lady of Pompeii.

Alleged miracles began to be reported, and people began flocking in droves to the church. Longo was encouraged by the Bishop of Nola to begin the construction of a larger church, the cornerstone being laid on 8 May 1876. The church was consecrated in May 1891 by Cardinal La Valletta. In 1939, the church was enlarged to a basilica, known today as the Shrine of the Virgin of the Rosary of Pompei. Longo also wrote spiritual works, including The History of the Sanctuary of Pompei.

== Later life and death ==
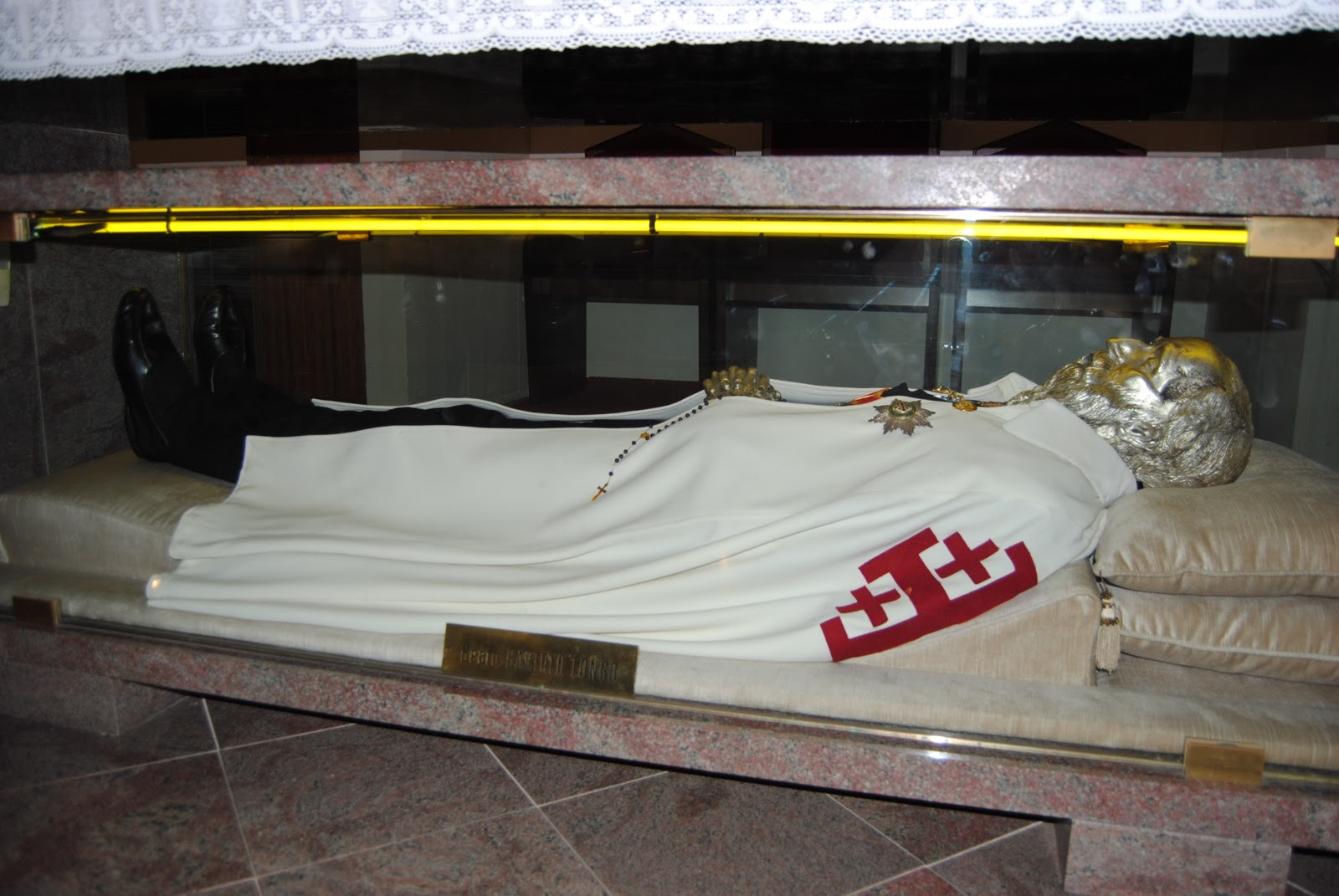
The relics of Bartolo Longo inside the Shrine of the Virgin of the Rosary of Pompei

Due to their years of collaboration on these spiritual and charitable works and at the suggestion of Pope Leo XIII, Bartolo Longo and the Countess Mariana di Fusco were married on 7 April 1885. The couple, however, lived in a Josephite marriage, while continuing to organize works such as schools and homes for orphans and the children of prisoners, which was considered radical at the time. In 1906, they donated the entire property of the Shrine of Our Lady of Pompei to the Holy See, and Longo relinquished his authority over all his works.

Longo continued promoting the rosary until his death on 5 October 1926, at the age of 85. The piazza on which the basilica stands has since been named in memory of Longo. His body is encased in a glass reliquary, and he is wearing the mantle and regalia of a Knight Grand Cross of the Order of the Holy Sepulchre of Jerusalem, a papal order of knighthood.

== Legacy ==
=== Nobel Peace Prize nominations ===
In 1902, Longo was nominated for the Nobel Peace Prize for organizing a petition drive for world peace from 1896 to 1900, collecting more than four million signatures in dozens of countries. His nomination was submitted to the Norwegian Nobel Committee by Pietro Chimienti, Antonio Cardarelli and 8 members of the Italian Senate and Chamber of Deputies.

In 1903, he was nominated again by Vincenzo Giuseppe De Prisco and Luigi Simeoni, highlighting his involvement in social and humanitarian issues. It was even supported by Pope Leo XIII. According to Instituto "Antonio Aveta", his nominations were not considered greatly because his work was of religious motives.

=== Canonization process ===
Longo's spiritual writings were approved by theologians on 1 February 1939 and 4 April 1943. His cause was formally opened on 28 February 1947, and he was given the title Servant of God.

On 26 October 1980, Longo was beatified by Pope John Paul II, calling him the "Apostle of the Rosary" and mentioning him specifically in his apostolic letter Rosarium Virginis Mariae ("The Rosary of the Virgin Mary").

On 25 February 2025, Pope Francis approved the favorable vote of the ordinary session of the Cardinals and Bishops of the Dicastery for the Causes of Saints for Longo to be canonized, which was done by Pope Leo XIV on 19 October 2025.

== Works ==
- Our Lady of Pompeii Novena
- May 8: Supplication to Our Lady of the Rosary of Pompeii (Patroness of the Royal House of Bourbon-Two Sicilies and the Sacred Military Constantinian Order of Saint George)
- San Domenico e l'Inquisizione al Tribunale della Ragione e della Storia (Valle di Pompei, typographic school-publisher Bartolo Longo, 1888
