= Chucky Bartolo =

Maltese stand-up comedian and drag queen (born 1993)

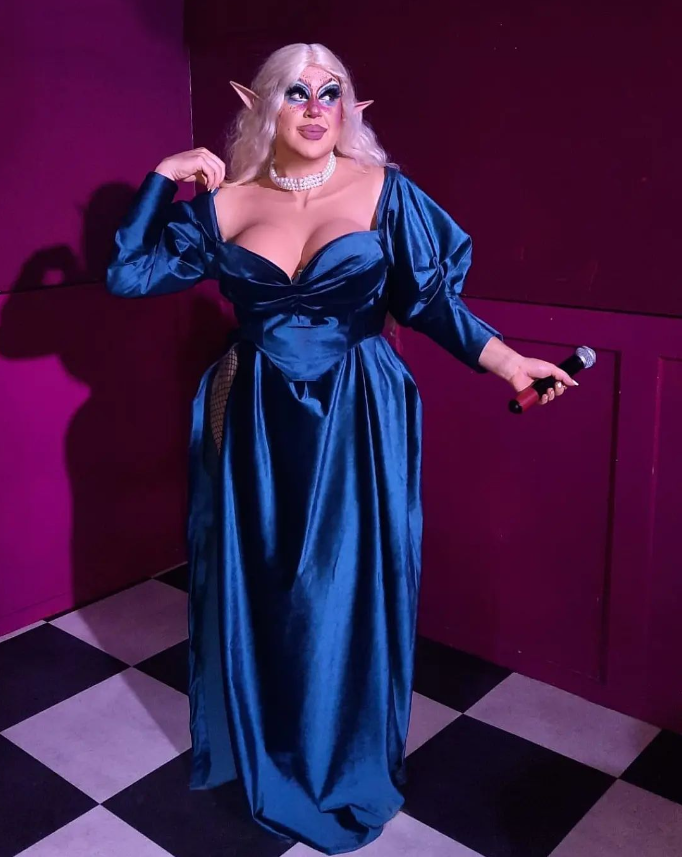
Chucky Bartolo, a Maltese drag performer at a stand-up show in Glasgow.

Chucky Bartolo (born Andrew Bartolo; 5 July 1993) is a Maltese stand-up comedian and drag queen. Currently based between Malta and Glasgow, his career breakthrough came as a writer and journalist for Lovin Malta after years of garnering a small following on YouTube as a vlogger. Bartolo is openly gay and uses his platform to speak out against hate speech and fight for reclamation of derogatory slurs.

Since November 2018, he has written and starred in four stand-up specials, and was the closing speaker of TEDx University of Malta's 2019 edition, 'Quirks'. In 2018, Bartolo also starred as the Dame in Malta's National Theatre (Teatru Malta)'s first pantomime and returned to the role in 2019 and 2020. To comply with COVID-19 safety regulations, the pantomime was moved to air on select national radio stations and is the only one taking place on the island in 2020.

In 2020, Bartolo also collaborated with the Government of Malta's Children's Festival, Żigużajg, to put on a digital show encouraging children to write creative stories and bring a modern twist to old fairytales. The digital programme was then brought to Malta as a live theatre production of the same name, "Fab Fantasy Fables with Chucky", in 2022.

Bartolo was the narrator and voice-over artist of the first-ever season of reality TV drama Love Island Malta which aired in 2023. He remains in this role, with the upcoming Season 4 of the show airing May 2026.

In September 2023, Bartolo hosted and performed at EuroPride 2023's official drag show, The Drag Spectacular, in Valletta.

Following a short break from pantomimes, December 2024 saw Bartolo reprised the role of Dame in their one-man pantomime "Chucky's Christmas Cracker - A Solo Panto Adventure". The show, held at Spazju Kreattiv, saw Bartolo play all the characters in the performance using costume, voice and wig changes to tell the full story. Bartolo returned to Spazju Kreattiv in 2025 with another one-man show under the new name "Chucky's Solo Panto".

In October 2025 Bartolo opened Sirena, Malta's first dedicated drag bar. Located in Sliema, Bartolo hosts and performs weekly drag shows, while also using the space to continue their advocacy work against anti-LGBT hate speech and violence.
