= Giulio Bartolocci =

Italian Cistercian Hebrew scholar and author

Dom Giulio Bartolocci OCist
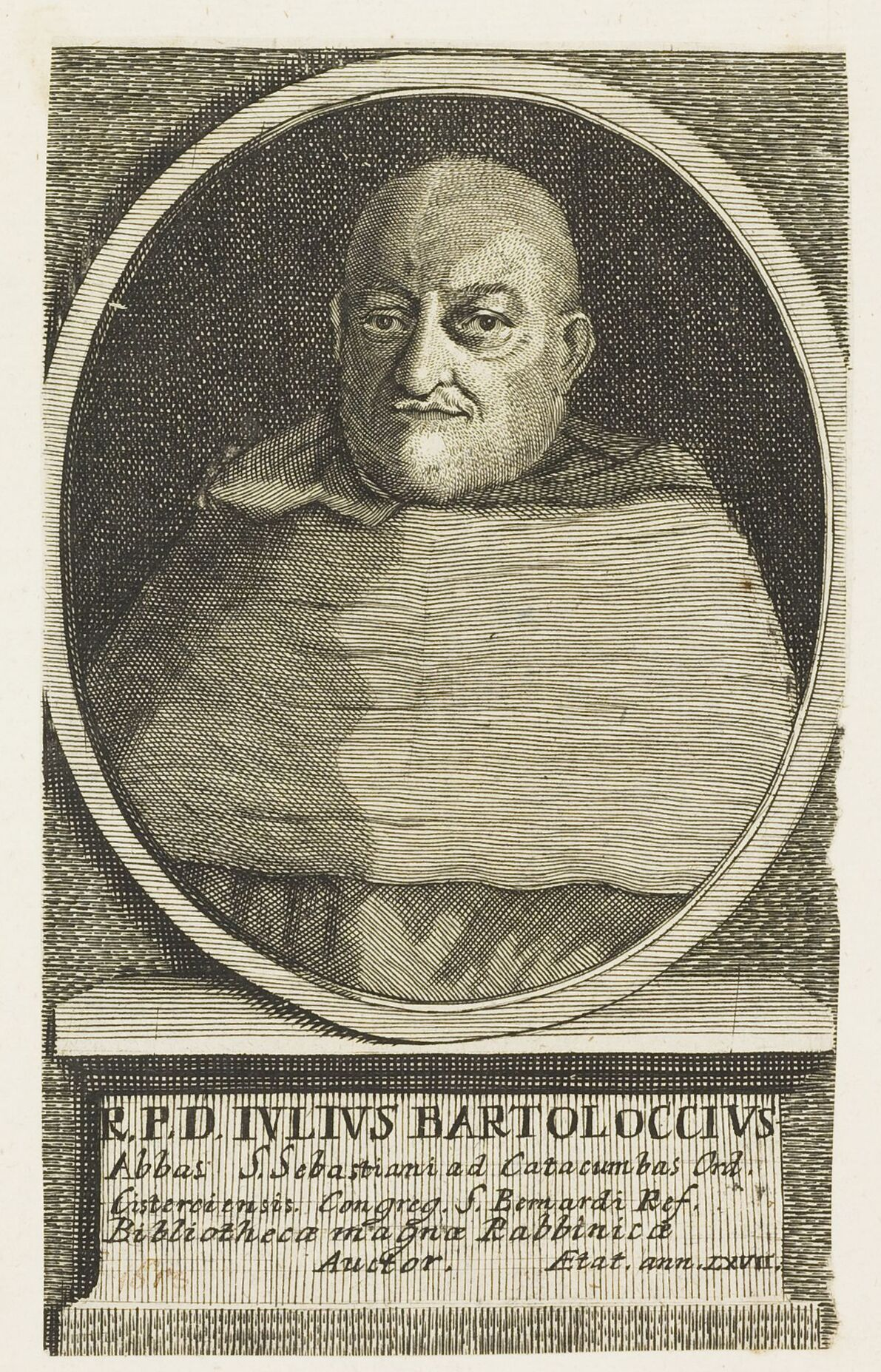
- Title: abbot

Personal life
- Born: April 1, 1613 Celleno, Papal States
- Died: 19 October 1687 (aged 74) Rome, Papal States
- Known for: Bibliotheca Magna Rabbinica (1675–1693)
- Other name: Iulius a Sancta Anastasia
- Occupation: Monk, Hebrew scholar

Religious life
- Religion: Roman Catholicism
- Order: Cistercians
- Ordination: 1632

Giulio Bartolocci OCist (1 April 1613 – 19 October 1687) was an Italian Cistercian Hebrew scholar and author of the four-volume Bibliotheca Magna Rabbinica.

== Life ==
He was born at Celleno and became the a pupil of a baptized Jew, Giovanni Battista, who instructed him in Hebrew. On completing his studies, Bartolocci entered the Cistercian order. It was from Battista that Bartolocci obtained his knowledge of Hebrew and rabbinical literature.

He was appointed, in 1651, professor of Hebrew and Rabbinics at the Collegium Neophytorum at Rome, and "Scriptor Hebraicus" at the Vatican Library. It was in the Vatican, and with the assistance of Battista, that Bartolocci received his preparation for the work that was to give him lasting fame in the world of Jewish bibliography; and it was at the Vatican and its subsidiary libraries that he obtained his chief materials.

In 1675 he began in Rome the publication of Bibliotheca Magna Rabbinica, a bibliography, in Latin and Hebrew, of Hebrew literature, arranged according to the names of the authors. This work appeared in four folio volumes, 1675–1693, three of which were published by the author and the fourth by Carlo Giuseppe Imbonati, his disciple. Imbonati's supplement contained a list of authors arranged according to the subjects on which they wrote. The latter added to this work a fifth volume, the Bibliotheca Latina Hebraica, Rome, 1694, which contained the works and the names of Christian authors who had written in Latin on Jews and Judaism.

It was from Battista that Bartolocci obtained the idea and plan of the Bibliotheca Magna Rabbinica, as well as part of the material. Battista began the composition of the book in a chronological order, which order was abandoned by Bartolocci. Richard Simon, in writing in his Bibliothèque Critique about Bartolocci's work, says:

"It contains much of Jewish learning, but little of judgment, and is conspicuous for a profound ignorance in the most common matters that concern criticism."

Complaints were also made that he devoted space to refutations of Jewish arguments and that his translations from the Talmud were faulty. On the other hand, Johann Christoph Wolf attributes to Bartolocci the motive and stimulus for his own later work.

Even with its faults, the Bibliotheca Rabbinica was a great undertaking. It was the first attempt on a large scale to give to the world an account of the literature of the Jews. It is not a mere bibliographic and biographic compilation, but contains also a number of dissertations on Jewish customs, observances, and religious ideas; on the Sambation, on the beginnings of Hebrew typography, and the like. Some Hebrew treatises are reprinted in full; for example, "Alphabet of Ben Sira," "Megillat Antiochus," "Otiot de-R. Aḳiba," and a part of Eldad ha-Dani's mythical journey.

Several attempts were made to render Bartolocci's work more accessible. The first who thought of publishing Bartolocci's work, with the omission of its Hebrew texts, etc., was the Oxford scholar Edward Bernard. Adriaan Reland of Holland attempted to publish in Amsterdam such an extract of the Bibliotheca, but he failed to execute the plan, there appearing in print the biographies alone of such famous exegetes as Rashi, Abraham ibn Ezra, David Ḳimḥi, Levi ben Gershom, and Judah Abravanel, which were embodied in his Analecta Rabbinica (Utrecht, 1702).

Bartolocci left in manuscript a work on the difficult expressions in the Mishnah.
