= Malta–Slovakia relations =

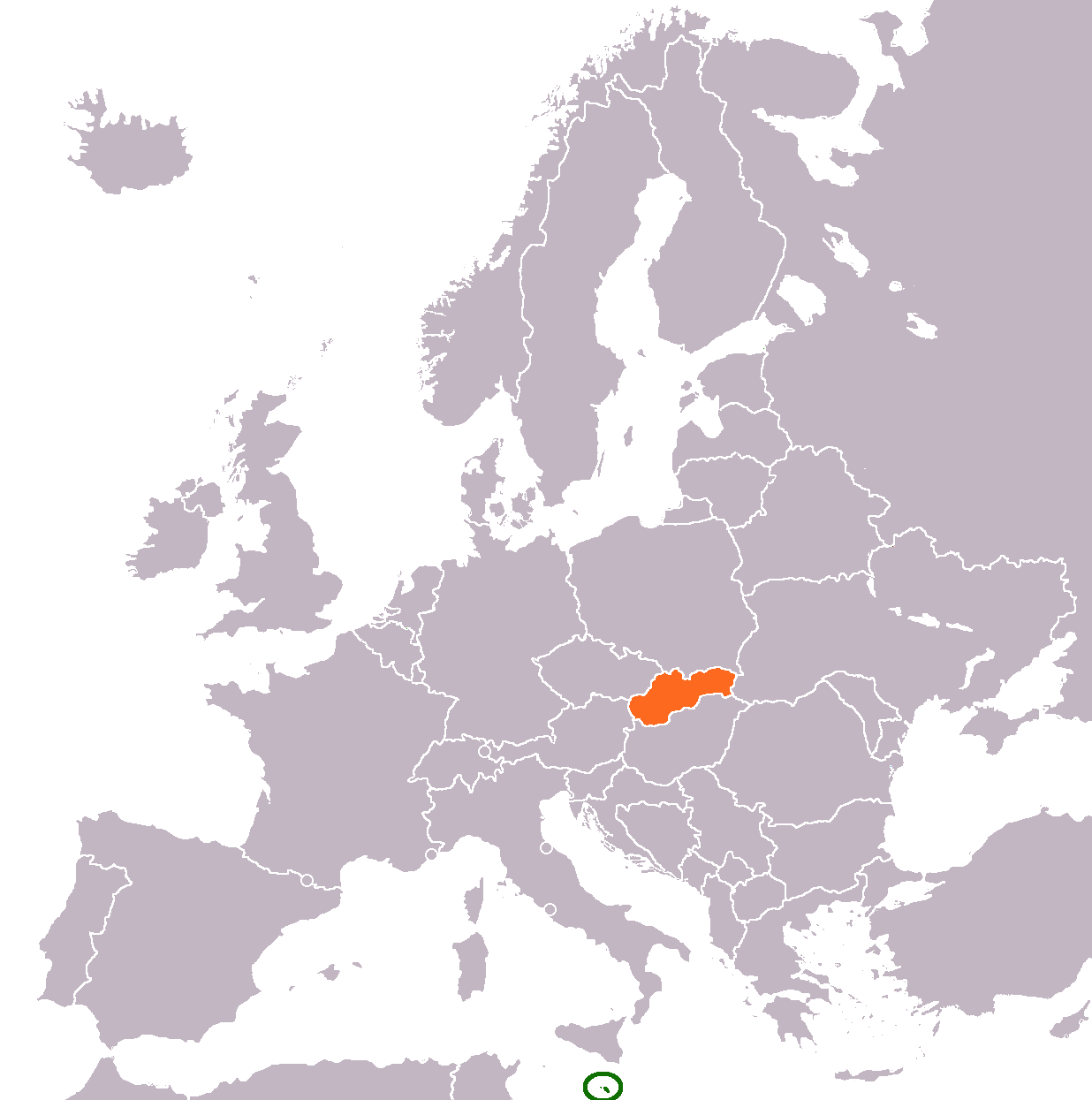
- Malta: Slovakia

Malta–Slovakia relations are the bilateral relations between Malta and Slovakia. Malta is represented in Slovakia through a non resident ambassador based in Valletta (in the Foreign Ministry). Slovakia is represented in Malta through its embassy in Rome (Italy) and an honorary consulate in Valletta. Both countries are full members of the European Union, Council of Europe, Organization for Security and Co-operation in Europe and both are fully within the Eurozone. Slovakia is a NATO member, whereas Malta, while not a member, participates in NATO's Partnership for Peace program.

== History ==
Malta and Slovakia established diplomatic relations in 1992, after the breakup of Czechoslovakia. The two countries also maintain diplomatic cooperation within broader European frameworks, with shared interests in economic integration and regional stability.

Malta backed the Slovak Republic to join the eurozone. In 2000, Maltese Prime Minister Edward Fenech Adami also told Slovak President Rudolf Schuster in Bratislava that Malta supported Slovakia in its efforts to join NATO and the European Union. Since both countries' entries to the European Union, officials have also made efforts to strengthen relations based on tourism.

== Bilateral agreements ==
As of 2008, Slovakia and Malta had six bilateral agreements spelling out cooperation in the avoidance of double taxation, air services, health care, combating crime, visa abolition, and investment.

In September 2009, Malta and Slovakia signed a memorandum of understanding setting the framework within which authorities from the two countries will identify, screen and facilitate the process of adoption of Slovak children by couples in Malta.

== Official visits ==
In 2001, Slovak prime minister Mikuláš Dzurinda visited Malta at the invitation of Maltese premier Edward Fenech Adami, and negotiated the integration of both countries into the European Union and the economic cooperation between Malta and Slovakia. Also in 2001, President of Malta Guido de Marco made a two-day official visit to Slovakia and met with Slovak President Rudolf Schuster. They agreed to widen cooperation in food and wood processing industries along with tourism. In 2008 Slovak agency SARIA signed with Malta Enterprise a treaty of reciprocal assistance related to third world countries. Slovak Prime Minister Robert Fico visited Maltese capital Valletta in 2008.

Slovak Deputy Prime Minister Dusan Caplovic visited Malta in October 2008 and had a meeting with Foreign Minister Tonio Borg. Dr. Borg described Maltese/Slovak relations as excellent. The Foreign Ministers discussed EU matters, notably the Lisbon Treaty, bilateral relations, illegal immigration, climate change and energy security issues.

Dr. Borg and the Foreign Affairs Minister of the Slovak Republic, Miroslav Lajcak, met in October 2009. Dr. Borg said that Slovakia is committed to help Malta to share its burden on illegal immigration and the Slovak Government announced that it will be taking a number of illegal immigrants from Malta.

== See also ==
- Foreign relations of Malta
- Foreign relations of Slovakia
- Malta-NATO relations
- NATO-EU relations
