= Albania–Malta relations =

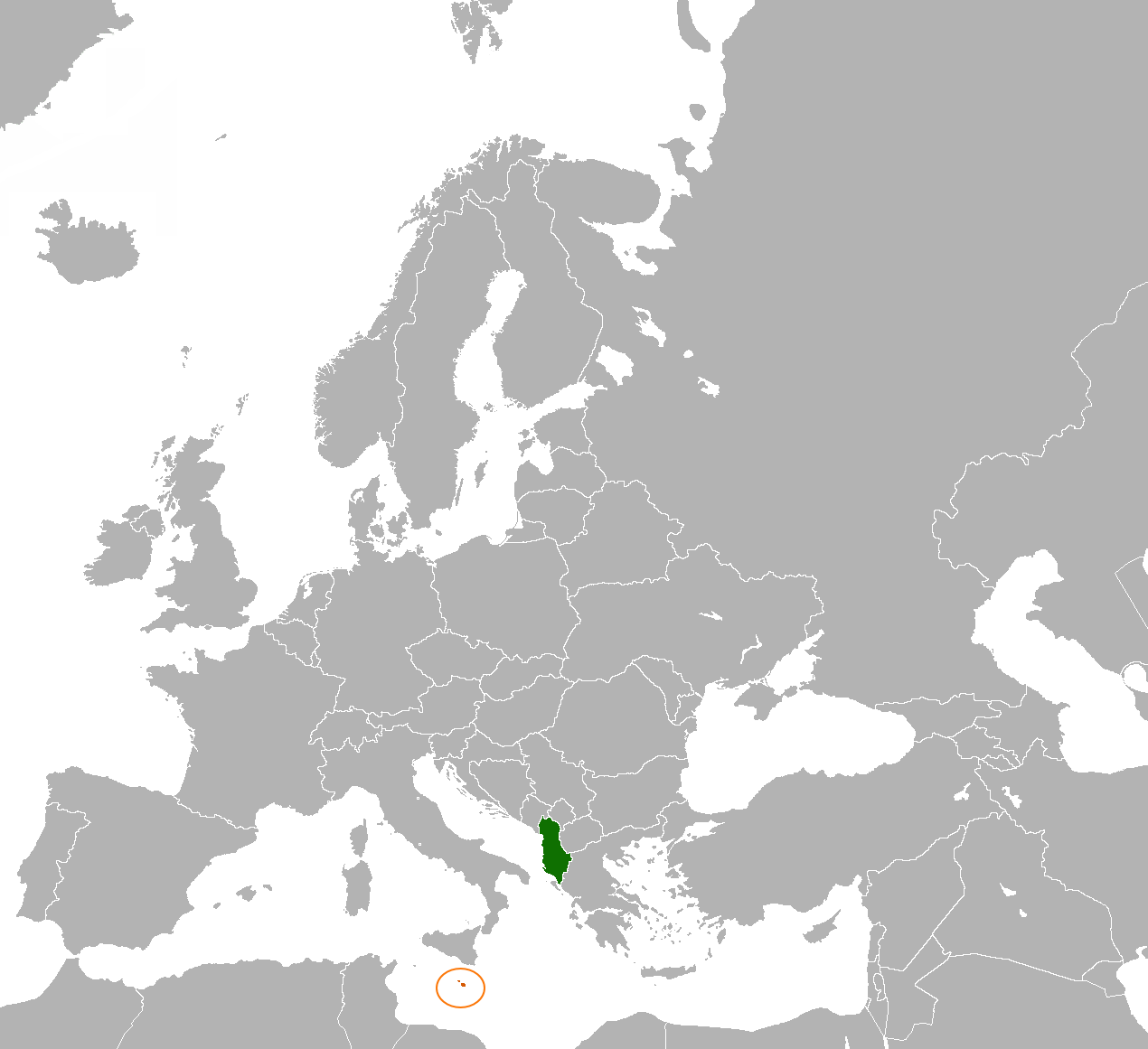
- Albania: Malta

Albania–Malta relations are the bilateral relations between Albania and Malta. Both countries are members of the Council of Europe and the Organization for Security and Co-operation in Europe.

The history of diplomatic relations of Albania and Malta dates back to March 5, 1973, when both countries established official relations.

Malta supports Albania's integration progress in the European Union. In 2016 both countries signed a memorandum of cooperation on the integration process of Albania into the European Union.

== See also ==
- Foreign relations of Albania
- Foreign relations of Malta
- Malta-NATO relations
- Accession of Albania to the EU
- NATO-EU relations
