= Malta–Turkey relations =

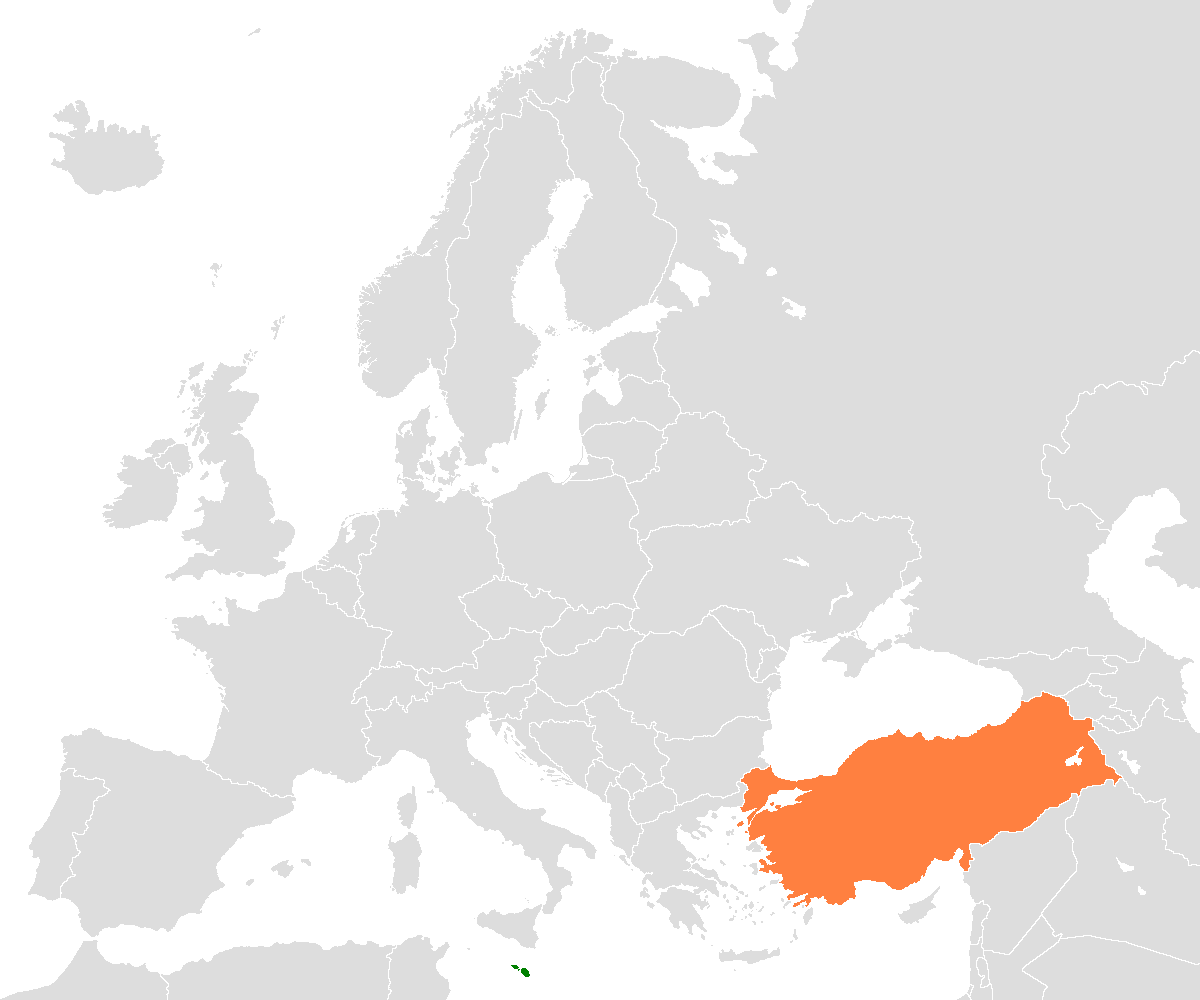
- Malta: Turkey

Malta–Turkey relations are foreign relations between Malta and Turkey. Malta is represented in Turkey through its embassy in Ankara and its consulate–general in Istanbul. Turkey is represented in Malta through its embassy in Valletta. Both countries are full members of the Council of Europe, the World Trade Organization and the Union for the Mediterranean. Turkey is a member of NATO. Malta instead is not a member of NATO.

== Historical background ==
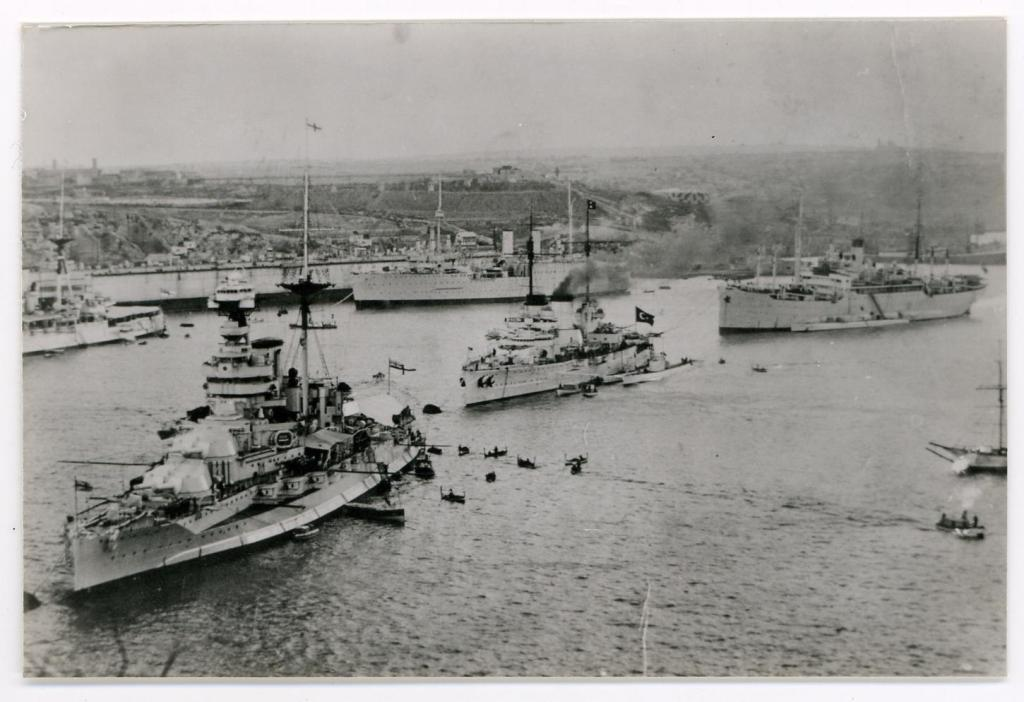
The Turkish Fleet visits Malta, 1936

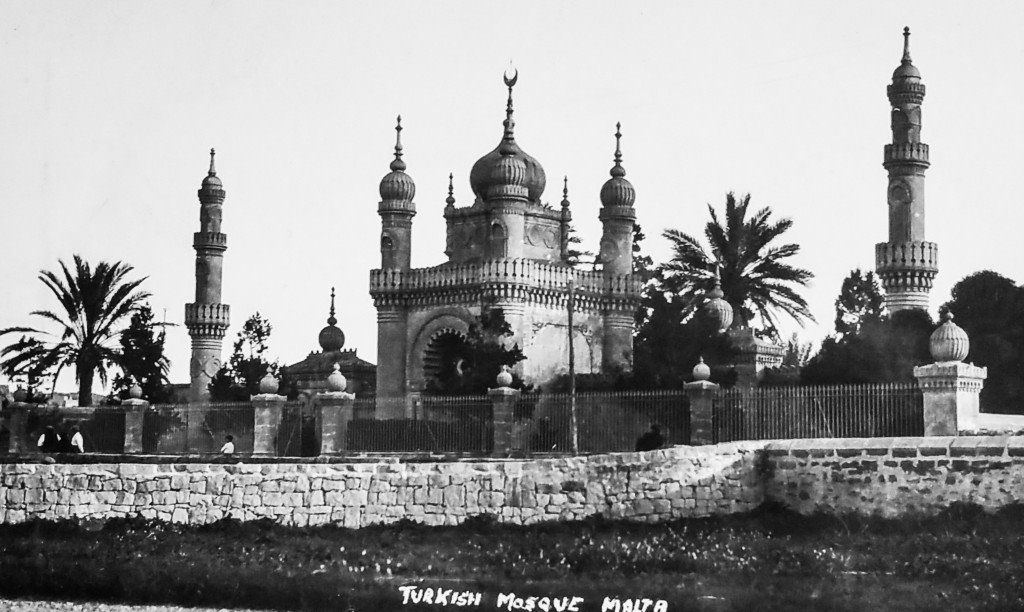
Turkish Military Cemetery in Marsa, Malta

Malta has a historical significance for the Turkish people as the place where Turgut Reis, a famous admiral of the Ottoman Navy, was killed during the Siege of Malta in 1565. There is a Turkish Military Cemetery at Marsa, which was commissioned by the Ottoman sultan in 1873.

== Political relations ==
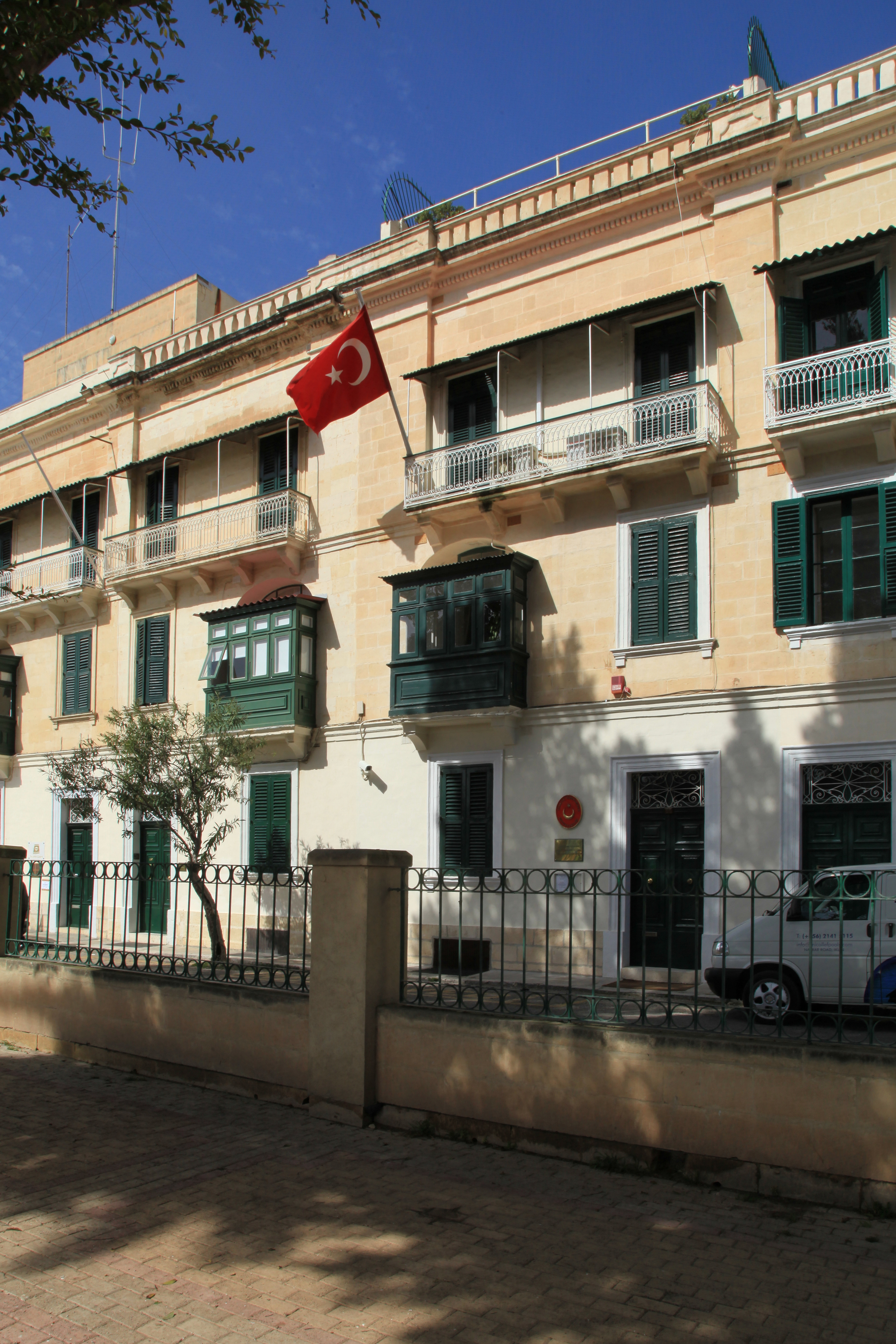
Turkish Embassy in Valletta

Malta is a European Union member since May 1, 2004 and Turkey is a candidate. These recent developments have helped to formalise diplomatic relations between the two countries.

An Agreement of Mutual Promotion and Protection of Investments and a Memorandum of Understanding on the Establishment of the Political Consultative Mechanism between the two countries was signed in October 2003 in Antalya.

== Economic relations ==
The trade volume between Malta and Turkey reached $1.124 billion in 2008. This figure shows an increase of a 35% when compared with the preceding year.

The Turkish–Maltese Business Council, and organisations with similar aims, give priority to promoting commercial linkages. This Council was established on September 7, 2007.

As of 2008, 24 Turkish firms are operating in Malta, and the total capital of these firms are $1.3 billion.

The maritime sector is one of the co-operation areas between the two countries. Because Malta has one of the major ship repair facilities in the Mediterranean, and Turkey is emerging as an important shipbuilding and fleet owning country.

Air Malta and Turkish Airlines signed a codeshare agreement in 2008.

An Agreement of Co-operation in Tourism between the two countries was signed on September 19, 1997.

In 2008, more than 3,058 Maltese tourists visited Turkey.

== Resident diplomatic missions ==
- Malta has an embassy in Ankara and an consulate-general in Istanbul.
- Turkey has an embassy in Valletta.

== See also ==
- Foreign relations of Malta
- Foreign relations of Turkey
- Malta-NATO relations
- Turkey–EU relations
  - Accession of Turkey to the EU
- NATO-EU relations
