= Malta–Portugal relations =

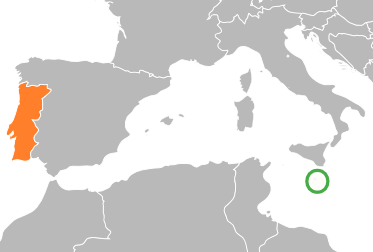
- Malta: Portugal

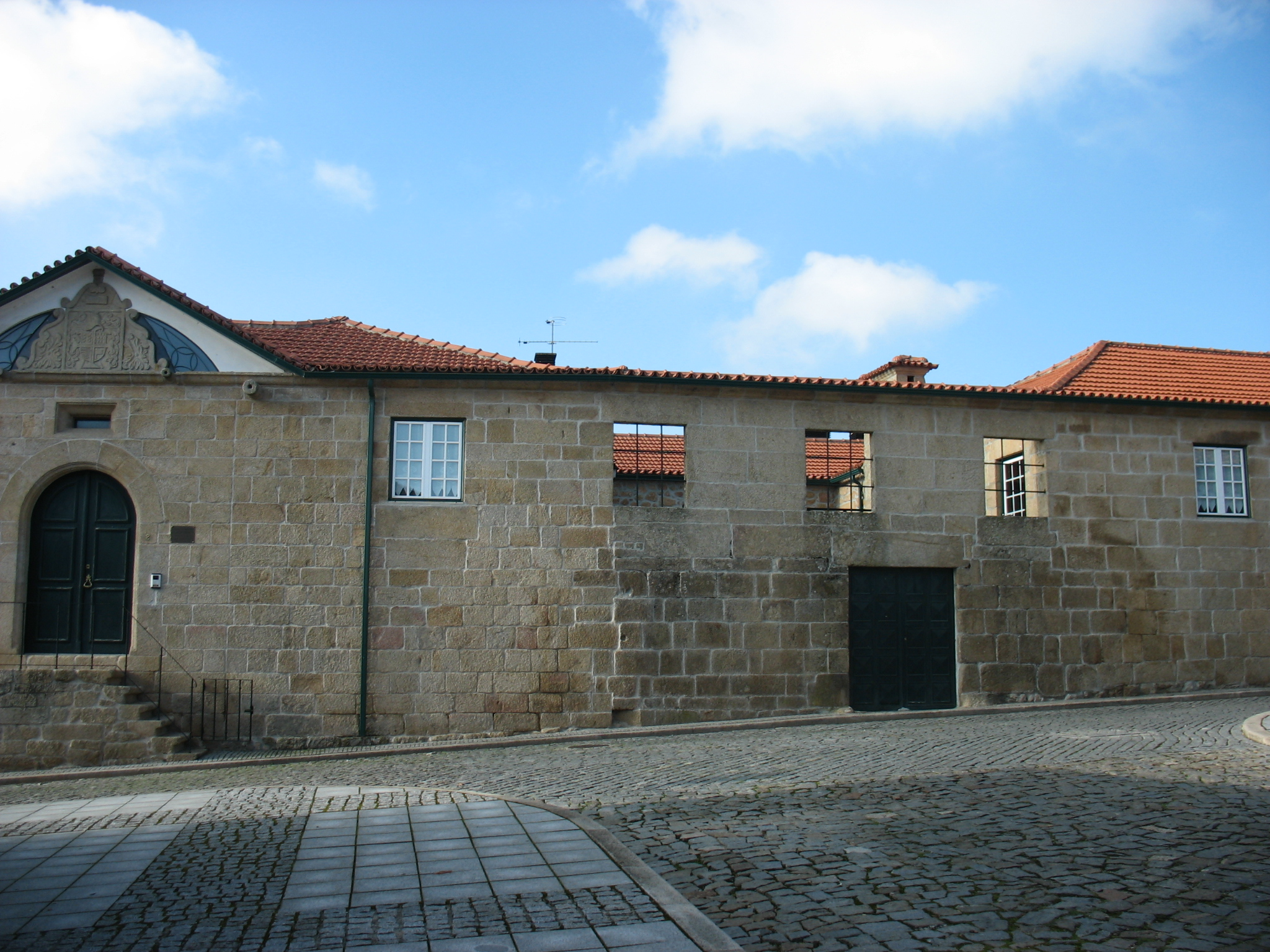
Sernancelhe (Portugal) - House of the Order of Malta - 17th century

Malta–Portugal relations are foreign relations between Malta and Portugal. Malta has an embassy in Lisbon and 4 honorary consulates (in Algarve, Azores, Lisbon and Porto). The current Ambassador of Malta to Portugal is H.E. Ms Rosette Spiteri Cachia.

Portugal is accredited to Malta from its embassy in Rome, Italy. Both countries are full members of the European Union, Council of Europe, Organization for Security and Co-operation in Europe and Union for the Mediterranean.

== State visits ==
Eddie Fenech Adami, visited Portugal between November 11, 2008 and November 11, 2008. President Adamia made a two-day state visit to Portugal in June 2009. During his visit he held talks with his Portuguese counterpart Aníbal Cavaco Silva, the Prime Minister José Sócrates, and the President of Parliament Jaime José de Matos da Gama.

== Trade ==
In 2007, Antonio Russo Dias, the Portuguese Ambassador to Malta said: "I don’t think that the fact that Portugal has the EU Presidency now will be a factor in improving trade and economic links between Malta and Portugal. However there is a bilateral plan to improve these relations with the recent opening of embassies in the respective countries so, yes there certainly is the will to improve links. There might be increased awareness of Portugal through the EU Presidency but not a direct link, at least in my opinion". Portuguese Banif Bank opened its first branch in Malta in 2008 and projected that it will have up to "25 more branches within five years and secure 10 per cent of the market".

== Diplomatic relations ==
Russo Dias was Portugal's first resident ambassador to Malta, ending his mission in September 2008. According to Maltese Prime Minister Lawrence Gonzi, relations between the two countries had reached unprecedented levels thanks to his efforts.

In June 2008, the Maltese ambassador in Portugal, Salv Stellini, paid a last call on Aníbal Cavaco Silva, the President of Portugal, ending his tenure as Malta's resident Ambassador in Lisbon. Cavaco Silva thanked Stellini for his support in setting up the Portuguese Embassy in Malta, and appointed him a member of Portugal's Order of Merit.

On 11 April 2017, the new Portuguese Ambassador to Malta, Francisco Maria de Sousa Ribeiro Telles met with the President of Malta, Marie-Louise Coleiro Preca at The Grandmaster's Palace (Valletta), to present his credentials and discuss bilateral relations.

== Resident diplomatic missions ==
- Malta has an embassy in Lisbon.
- Portugal is accredited to Malta from its embassy in Rome, Italy.
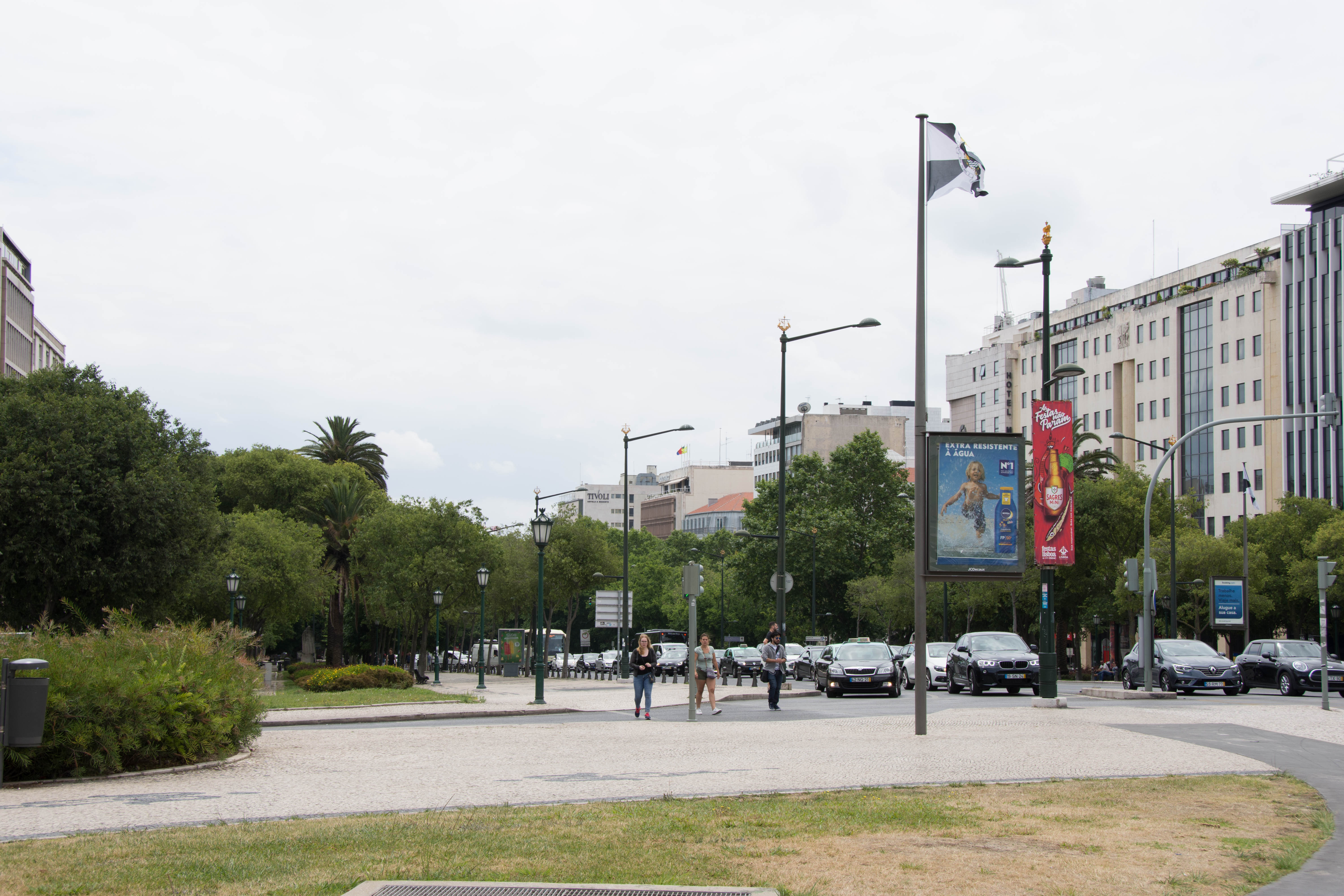
Embassy of Malta in Lisbon

== See also ==
- Foreign relations of Malta
- Foreign relations of Portugal
- Malta-NATO relations
- NATO-EU relations
