= Canada–Malta relations =

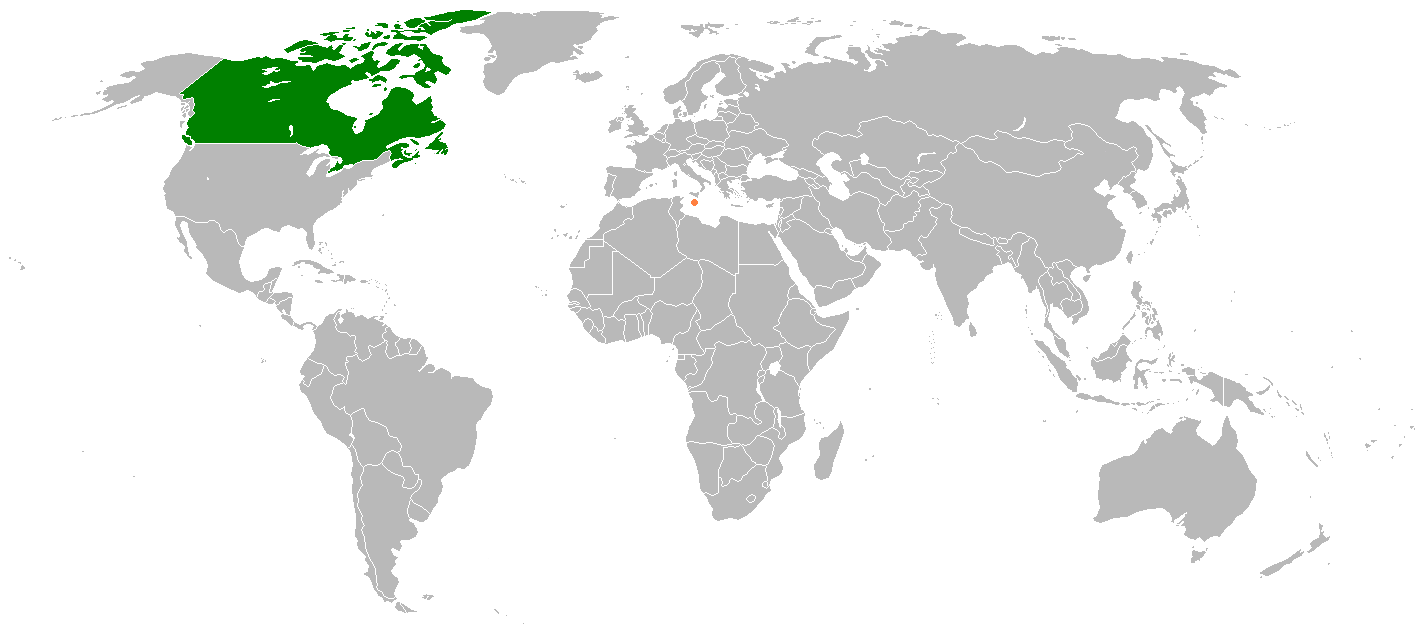

- Canada: Malta

Canada–Malta relations are the bilateral relations between Canada and Malta. Both countries are full members of the Commonwealth of Nations.

- Malta has a consulate general in Toronto and four honorary consuls in (from west to east) Vancouver, Edmonton, Laval and St. John's.
- Canada hosts a large Maltese immigrant community.

== Resident diplomatic missions ==
- Canada is accredited to Malta from its embassy in Rome, Italy and maintains an honorary consul in Valletta.
- Malta is accredited to Canada from its embassy in Washington, D.C., United States. The Ambassador of Malta to the United States also serves as High Commissioner of Malta to Canada.

== See also ==
- Foreign relations of Canada
- Foreign relations of Malta
- Canada-EU relations
- Malta-NATO relations
- NATO-EU relations
- Maltese Canadians
