= Malta–Spain relations =

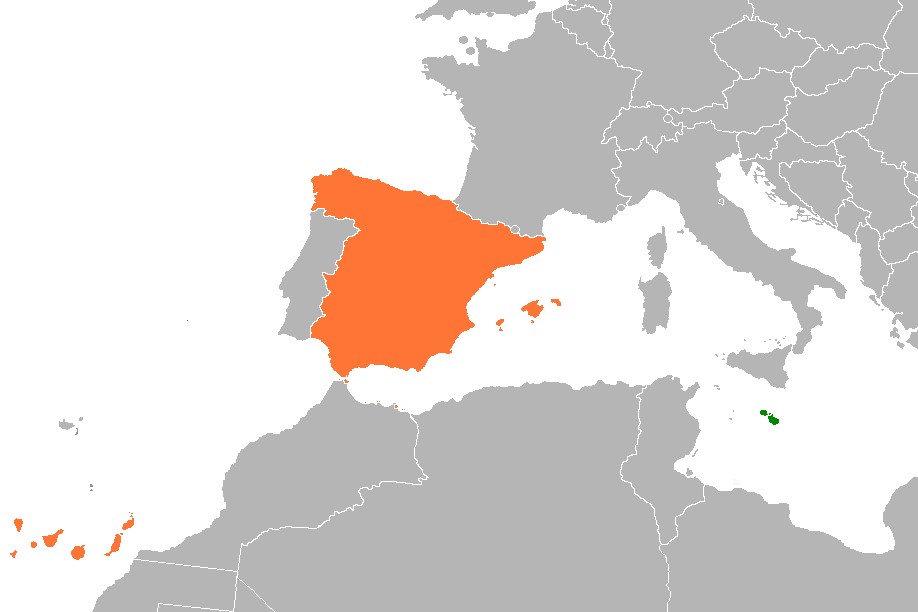
- Malta: Spain

Malta–Spain relations (Maltese: Relazzjonijiet Malta-Spanja; Spanish: Relaciones Malta-España) are the foreign relations between the Republic of Malta and the Kingdom of Spain. Both countries established mutual diplomatic relations in 1977. Malta has an embassy in Madrid and 5 honorary consulates (in Barcelona, Palma de Mallorca, Santander, Seville and Valencia). The current Ambassador of Malta to Spain is H.E. Dr Emmanuel Mallia.

Spain has an embassy in Ta' Xbiex and Cultural Centre in Balzan. Both countries are full members of the European Union and of the Union for the Mediterranean. In 2019, both countries celebrated 50 years of relations, highlighting "the strong cultural and historical ties" of both countries and their contribution to the European Union and the Mediterranean.

== History ==
In 1530, Emperor Charles I, as King of Aragon and Sicily, ceded the sovereignty of this island to the Knights of the Order of Saint John, who since then have been known as the Order of Malta. The knights would not forget the monarch's gesture of generosity, the famous tribute of the Maltese Falcon was instituted by the Order of Malta, the old tribute that this historic institution dedicated to the Hispanic crown.

Malta and Spain share a rich and intertwined history that has evolved over several centuries, marked by significant events and deep-rooted cultural connections.

Historical Background

In 1283, the Crown of Aragon, a significant Spanish realm, took control of Malta. This period marked the beginning of Spanish influence on the island. Later, in 1412, the Kingdom of Castille assumed control over Malta. The eventual union of Aragon and Castille led to Malta becoming part of the burgeoning Spanish Empire.

A pivotal moment in Malta's history occurred in 1530 when Emperor Charles I, also known as King of Aragon and Sicily, granted sovereignty over Malta to the Knights of the Order of Saint John. This act was a strategic move to fortify the Mediterranean against Ottoman expansion. To honor this grant, the Order instituted the annual tribute of the Maltese Falcon to the Spanish Crown, symbolizing their fealty and the enduring bond between Malta and Spain.

Modern Diplomatic Relations

Fast forward to the 20th century, Malta and Spain established formal diplomatic relations in 1977. Since then, both nations have maintained embassies in each other's capitals: Malta operates an embassy in Madrid and honorary consulates in cities like Barcelona, Palma de Mallorca, Santander, Seville, and Valencia; Spain maintains an embassy in Ta' Xbiex and a Cultural Centre in Balzan. In 2019, the two countries commemorated 50 years of diplomatic relations, reflecting on their shared cultural and historical ties and their collaborative contributions to the European Union and the Mediterranean region.

== Migration issues ==
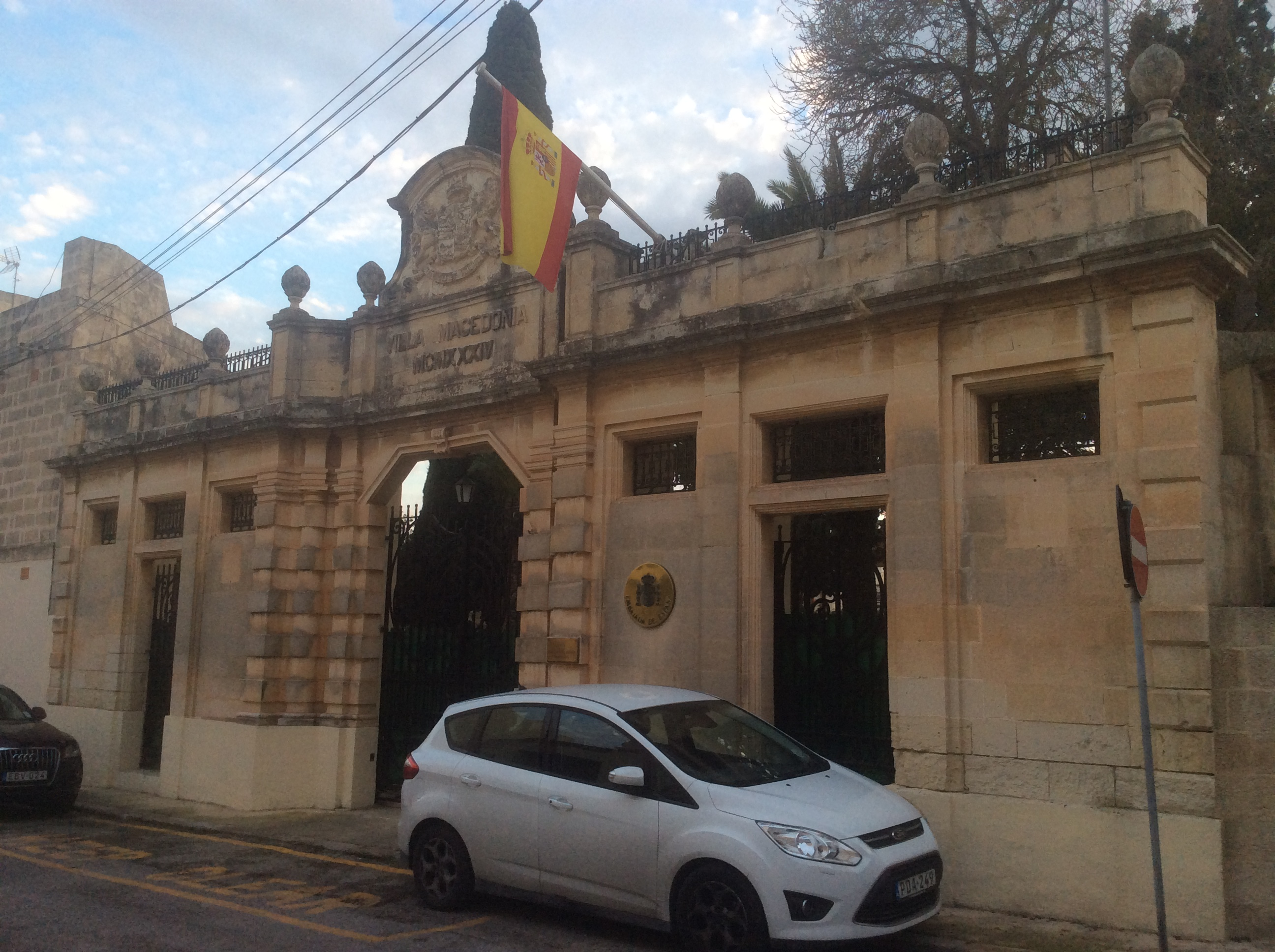
Villa Macedonia, Cultural Centre of Hispanic-Maltese (relations) at Balzan

In December 2008, the two countries agreed to collaborate on issues relating to illegal migration, including repatriation. In a meeting between Home Affairs Minister Carmelo Mifsud Bonnici and his Spanish counterpart Alfredo Perez Rubalcaba, they agreed that the implementation of the Immigration and Asylum Pact was a priority. The two countries agreed that a group of Spanish police should be sent to Malta in 2009 to help the Maltese force with repatriation.

In February 2022, Malta agreed to introduce migratory policy in the Southern Neighborhood.

== Agreements ==
In January 2007, the two countries entered into a tax treaty.

Over the years, Malta and Spain have collaborated on various fronts. In December 2008, they agreed to cooperate on issues related to illegal migration, including repatriation efforts. This collaboration underscored their commitment to addressing common challenges in the Mediterranean region. Wikipedia, la enciclopedia libre

Additionally, in January 2007, both countries signed a tax treaty to strengthen economic relations and provide a framework for financial cooperation. Wikipedia, la enciclopedia libre

Today, Malta and Spain continue to enjoy a robust relationship, characterized by mutual respect, shared cultural values, and active collaboration within international organizations such as the European Union and the Union for the Mediterranean.

== See also ==
- Foreign relations of Malta
- Foreign relations of Spain
- Malta-NATO relations
- NATO-EU relations
