= Germany–Malta relations =

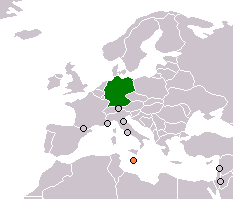

- Germany: Malta

Germany and Malta have maintained diplomatic relations since 1965. Both countries are members of the Organization for Security and Cooperation in Europe, the European Union, the Schengen area and the Eurozone. Malta cooperates with NATO in the Partnership for Peace program. Germany has given full support to Malta's membership of the European Union.

The Republic of Malta has an embassy in Berlin, Germany. The current ambassador of Malta to Germany is Marlene Bonnici.

== History ==
In the Middle Ages, Malta was under the rule of the Hohenstaufen dynasty from 1194 to 1268, who were the Roman-German rulers at that time. In the 16th century, Malta briefly came under the rule of the Holy Roman Emperor Charles V, who offered it as a fiefdom to the Order of Saint John, expelled from Rhodes, in 1525. The Order determined the history of the island for the following 268 years and is therefore often called the "Order of Malta".

In 1798 Napoléon Bonaparte was sighted with his fleet off Malta. Under the only German Grand Master of the Order so far, Ferdinand von Hompesch zu Bolheim, the island was surrendered without a fight and abandoned by the Knights of the Order, so that Ferdinand was also the last Grand Master to reside on Malta. After a Maltese rebellion, the islands came to Great Britain in 1800, under whose control it would remain until 1964.

During World War I, operations against German submarines were launched from Malta. During World War II, Malta once again served as a base for the Allies due to its strategic location. The island was subsequently hit by over 2000 German and Italian air raids (see Siege of Malta (World War II)), to which more than 1500 Maltese fell victim. In 1964 Malta gained its independence. Diplomatic relations between the Federal Republic of Germany and Malta were established in 1965. Relations have intensified with Malta's accession to the European Union in 2004.

== Cultural relations ==
The University of Malta has maintained a fully-fledged German Studies program since 2008.

The German-Maltese Society has existed since 1991 and is based in Adenau.

== Economic relations ==
Germany is one of Malta's most important trading partners. The total volume of trade with Malta amounted to 1.1 billion euros in 2021, putting Malta in 77th place in the ranking of German trading partners. German exports to Malta that year totaled 637 million euros, while imports from Malta totaled 435 million euros. Around 50 to 60 German companies are active in Malta and have invested around 17 billion euros.

Malta is very popular with German tourists: they make up the largest contingent of holidaymakers alongside the British and Italians.

== See also ==
- Foreign relations of Germany
- Foreign relations of Malta
- Malta-NATO relations
- NATO-EU relations
