= Malta–NATO relations =

Malta – NATO relations
- NATO: Malta

Malta and the North Atlantic Treaty Organization (NATO) have a close relationship. Malta is one of four members of the European Union that are not members of NATO, the others being Austria, Cyprus and Ireland. Malta has had formal relations with NATO since 1995, when it joined the Partnership for Peace programme. While it withdrew in 1996, it rejoined as a member in 2008.

== History ==
Map of NATO in Europe: Members of NATO Membership Action Plan Intensified Dialogue / Individual Partnership Action Plan Partnership for Peace Aspiring Partnership for Peace members

NATO member countries Countries in the process of accession Countries promised invitations / Membership is not the goal Countries have not announced their membership intentions

Map showing European membership of the EU and NATO EU member only NATO member only member of both

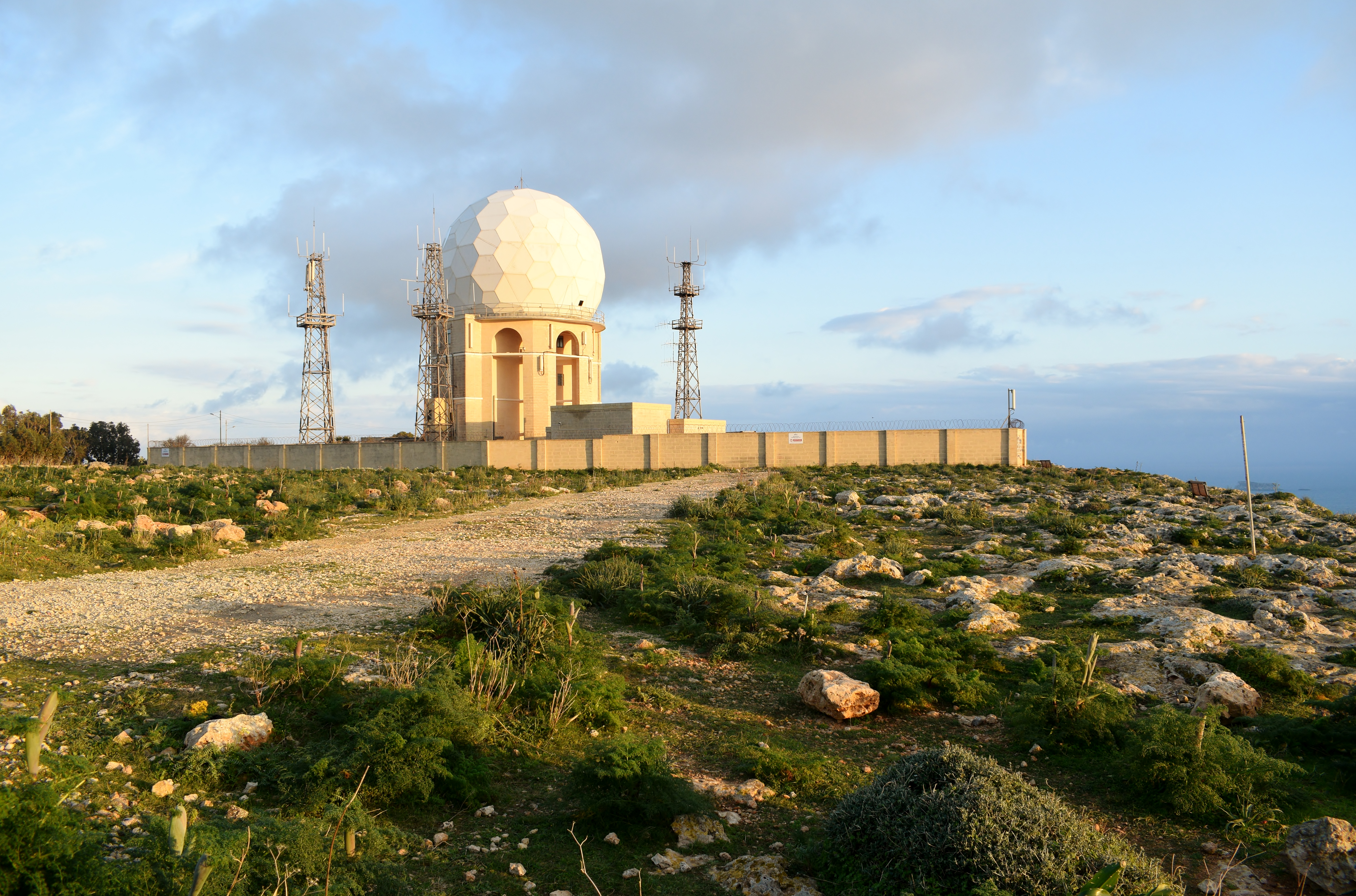
During the Cold War, NATO used radar facilities in Malta, which, like other non-NATO member European states, has generally cooperative relations with the organization.

When the North Atlantic Treaty was signed in 1949, the Mediterranean island of Malta was a dependent territory of the United Kingdom, one of the treaty's original signatories. As such, the Crown Colony of Malta shared the UK's international memberships, including NATO. Between 1952 and 1965, the headquarters of the Allied Forces Mediterranean was based in the town of Floriana, just outside Malta's capital of Valletta. When Malta gained independence in 1964, prime minister George Borg Olivier wanted the country to join NATO. Olivier was concerned that the presence of the NATO headquarters in Malta, without the security guarantees that NATO membership entailed, made the country a potential target. However, according to a memorandum he prepared at the time he was discouraged from formally submitting a membership application by Deputy Secretary General of NATO James A. Roberts. It was believed that some NATO members, including the United Kingdom, were opposed to Maltese NATO membership. As a result Olivier considered alternatives, such as seeking associate membership or unilateral security guarantees from NATO, or closing the NATO headquarters in Malta in retaliation. Ultimately, Olivier supported the alliance and signed a defense agreement with the UK for use of Maltese military facilities in exchange for around £2 million a year. This friendly policy changed in 1971, when Dom Mintoff, of the Labour Party, was elected as prime minister. Mintoff supported neutrality as his foreign policy, and the position was later enshrined into the country's constitution in 1974 as an amendment to Article 1. The country joined the Non-Aligned Movement in 1979, at the same time when the British Royal Navy left its base at the Malta Dockyard.

In 1995, under Prime Minister Eddie Fenech Adami of the Nationalist Party, Malta joined the Euro-Atlantic Partnership Council multilateral defense forum and NATO's Partnership for Peace program. When the Labour Party regained power the following year, however, they withdrew Malta from both organizations. Though the Nationalists resumed the majority in parliament in 1998, Malta didn't rejoin the EAPC and PfP programs again until 2008, after the country had joined the European Union in 2004. Since re-joining, Malta has been building its relations with NATO and getting involved in wider projects including the PfP Planning and Review Process and the NATO Science for Peace and Security Program.

NATO membership is not supported by any of the country's political parties, including neither the governing Labour Party nor the opposition Nationalist Party. NATO's secretary-general Jens Stoltenberg has stated that the alliance fully respects Malta's position of neutrality, and put no pressure for the country to join the alliance. Polling done by the island-nation's Ministry of Foreign Affairs found in February 2022 that 63% of those surveyed supported the island's neutrality, and only 6% opposed the policy, with 14% undecided. A Eurobarometer survey in May 2022 found that 75% of Maltese would however support greater military cooperation within the European Union.

== Relationship timeline ==
Event	Date
Partnership for Peace	1995-04-26 (Withdrew 1996-10-27); 2008-04-03

== Malta's foreign relations with NATO member states ==
- Albania
- Belgium
- Bulgaria
- Canada
- Croatia
- Czech Republic
- Denmark
- Estonia
- Finland
- France
- Germany
- Greece
- Hungary
- Iceland
- Italy
- Latvia
- Lithuania
- Luxembourg
- Montenegro
- Netherlands
- North Macedonia
- Norway
- Poland
- Portugal
- Romania
- Slovakia
- Slovenia
- Spain
- Sweden
- Turkey
- United Kingdom
- United States

== See also ==
- Foreign relations of Malta
- Foreign relations of NATO
- Malta and the Non-Aligned Movement
- Enlargement of NATO
- NATO open door policy
- Partnership for Peace
- Neutral member states in the European Union
- European Union–NATO relations

=== NATO relations of other EU member states outside NATO ===
- Austria–NATO relations
- Cyprus–NATO relations
- Ireland–NATO relations
