= Foreign relations of Malta =

After independence from the United Kingdom in 1964, Malta followed a policy of close co-operation with NATO countries. Since 1971, the country sought relations with the rest of the world, including communist countries in Eastern Europe and the non-aligned countries.

After substantially increased financial contributions from several NATO countries (including the United States), the Royal Navy remained in the Malta Dockyard until 1979. Following their departure, Malta charted a new course of neutrality and became an active member of the Non-Aligned Movement. The country joined the Non-Aligned Movement in 1973 as the third European member state after Cyprus and SFR Yugoslavia. Malta is an active participant in the United Nations, the Commonwealth, the Council of Europe, OSCE, and various other international organisations. In these forums, Malta has frequently expressed its concern for the peace and economic development of the Mediterranean region.

On May 1, 2004, Malta withdrew from the Non-Aligned Movement and became a full member of the European Union, with which it had an association agreement since 1971. It was one of ten new members which joined on that date. The Ministry for Foreign Affairs, at Palazzo Parisio, oversees the direction of Maltese foreign policy. The country has close relations with most sovereign countries, with an emphasis on increased trade and foreign direct investment.

== Diplomatic relations ==
List of countries which Malta maintains diplomatic relations with:

#	Country	Date
1	Australia	21 September 1964
2	France	21 September 1964
3	Italy	21 September 1964
4	United Kingdom	21 September 1964
5	United States	21 September 1964
6	Canada	21 December 1964
7	Germany	16 February 1965
8	India	10 March 1965
9	South Korea	30 April 1965
10	Libya	11 June 1965
11	Belgium	11 June 1965
12	Japan	15 July 1965
13	Netherlands	6 October 1965
14	Egypt	2 November 1965
15	Israel	1 December 1965
—	Holy See	15 December 1965
16	Pakistan	January 1966
17	Switzerland	25 March 1966
18	Greece	30 April 1966
—	Sovereign Military Order of Malta	27 June 1966
19	Austria	9 November 1966
20	Russia	26 July 1967
21	Turkey	10 October 1967
22	Tunisia	21 December 1967
23	Romania	7 June 1968
24	Spain	7 June 1968
25	Czech Republic	10 July 1968
26	Serbia	6 January 1969
27	Luxembourg	28 January 1969
28	Norway	7 February 1969
29	Finland	21 February 1969
30	Denmark	26 March 1969
31	Sweden	21 June 1969
32	Hungary	12 December 1970
33	Syria	1970
34	Bulgaria	10 September 1971
35	Poland	23 October 1971
36	Iraq	3 December 1971
37	North Korea	20 December 1971
38	China	31 January 1972
39	Iran	May 1972
40	Cyprus	13 September 1972
41	Kuwait	3 October 1972
42	Zambia	17 October 1972
43	Albania	5 March 1973
44	United Arab Emirates	20 November 1973
45	New Zealand	23 November 1973
46	Sudan	27 November 1973
47	Vietnam	14 January 1974
48	Ghana	27 February 1974
49	Eswatini	25 March 1974
50	Nigeria	24 May 1974
51	Jordan	4 June 1974
52	Bahrain	4 November 1974
53	Oman	4 November 1974
54	Morocco	18 December 1974
55	Algeria	22 January 1975
56	Argentina	29 May 1975
57	Qatar	18 June 1975
58	Brazil	23 June 1975
59	Lebanon	1 July 1975
60	Portugal	12 July 1975
61	Saudi Arabia	1 September 1975
62	Malaysia	8 October 1975
63	Uruguay	13 October 1975
64	Mexico	29 October 1975
65	Panama	19 January 1976
66	Guyana	12 March 1976
67	Gambia	21 October 1976
68	Senegal	2 November 1976
69	Yemen	24 February 1977
70	Cuba	11 April 1977
71	Peru	27 April 1977
72	Philippines	9 June 1977
73	Venezuela	17 September 1977
74	Mongolia	8 August 1979
75	Nicaragua	August 1979
76	Indonesia	1 December 1979
77	Bangladesh	20 December 1979
78	Ecuador	1 January 1980
79	Guinea	30 March 1980
80	Mali	1 December 1980
81	Ethiopia	30 November 1982
82	Nepal	25 September 1983
83	Thailand	17 December 1984
84	Maldives	5 March 1985
85	Colombia	31 March 1986
86	Brunei	15 August 1986
87	Bolivia	7 July 1987
88	Singapore	16 May 1988
89	Seychelles	11 April 1989
90	Chile	11 December 1989
91	Ireland	13 June 1990
92	Estonia	1 January 1992
93	Latvia	1 January 1992
94	Ukraine	5 March 1992
95	Slovenia	29 June 1992
96	Croatia	30 June 1992
97	Slovakia	1 January 1993
98	Kazakhstan	4 February 1993
99	South Africa	10 February 1993
100	Belarus	16 February 1993
101	Kyrgyzstan	19 February 1993
102	Turkmenistan	25 February 1993
103	Uzbekistan	25 February 1993
104	Georgia	26 February 1993
105	Armenia	7 June 1993
106	Lithuania	7 February 1994
107	Marshall Islands	8 February 1994
108	Azerbaijan	9 January 1995
109	San Marino	17 July 1995
110	Andorra	25 July 1995
111	Bosnia and Herzegovina	14 October 1995
112	Guatemala	11 December 1995
113	Moldova	3 July 1996
114	Iceland	3 July 1998
115	Sri Lanka	27 January 2000
116	Monaco	11 April 2001
117	Sierra Leone	16 October 2001
118	Mauritania	20 February 2003
119	Liechtenstein	12 May 2003
120	Timor-Leste	20 May 2003
121	Honduras	8 June 2004
122	El Salvador	9 June 2004
123	Paraguay	8 July 2004
124	Uganda	21 July 2004
125	Samoa	22 July 2004
126	Antigua and Barbuda	23 July 2004
127	Bahamas	20 September 2004
128	Vanuatu	29 September 2004
129	Belize	1 October 2004
130	Jamaica	27 October 2004
131	Kenya	5 November 2004
132	Namibia	9 December 2004
133	Saint Vincent and the Grenadines	10 December 2004
134	Botswana	6 January 2005
135	Cambodia	13 January 2005
136	Dominica	11 February 2005
137	Mauritius	19 May 2005
138	Barbados	21 October 2005
139	Saint Kitts and Nevis	25 November 2005
140	Tuvalu	20 January 2006
141	Cameroon	27 January 2006
142	Lesotho	11 April 2006
143	Montenegro	19 July 2006
144	Tonga	3 May 2007
145	Tajikistan	25 September 2007
146	Afghanistan	8 February 2008
147	Burkina Faso	8 February 2008
148	Togo	16 May 2008
149	Liberia	20 May 2008
150	Nauru	19 November 2008
151	Niger	11 December 2008
152	Eritrea	18 December 2008
153	Benin	25 March 2009
154	Mozambique	18 May 2009
155	Trinidad and Tobago	24 September 2009
156	Saint Lucia	11 March 2010
157	Angola	15 June 2010
158	Solomon Islands	23 December 2010
159	Laos	13 January 2011
160	Republic of the Congo	14 February 2011
161	Grenada	26 May 2011
162	Malawi	21 July 2011
—	Kosovo	23 September 2011
163	Somalia	11 June 2014
164	Fiji	11 December 2014
165	Burundi	12 January 2015
166	Tanzania	11 June 2015
167	Ivory Coast	6 November 2015
168	Cape Verde	17 March 2016
169	North Macedonia	25 January 2017
170	Dominican Republic	23 February 2017
171	Myanmar	5 April 2017
172	Papua New Guinea	6 October 2017
—	Cook Islands	6 October 2017
173	Djibouti	26 June 2018
174	Rwanda	12 July 2018
175	Palau	17 July 2018
176	São Tomé and Príncipe	24 September 2018
177	Federated States of Micronesia	25 September 2018
178	Madagascar	22 September 2021
179	Kiribati	21 September 2022
180	Suriname	18 May 2023
—	State of Palestine	22 September 2025
181	Zimbabwe	21 September 2026
182	Costa Rica	Unknown

== Bilateral relations ==
=== Multilateral ===
Organization	Formal Relations Began	Notes
European Union		See 2004 enlargement of the European Union Malta joined the European Union as a full member on 1 May 2004.
NATO		See Malta–NATO relations Malta is not a member of NATO.

=== Africa ===
Country	Formal Relations Began	Notes
Egypt	4 November 1965	Malta has an embassy in Cairo and 2 honorary consulates in Alexandria and Suez.; Egypt has an embassy in Ta' Xbiex.
Gambia	21 October 1976	Both countries have a Memorandum on Migration Matters.
Ghana	27 February 1974	Ghana has a high commission in Valletta.; Malta has a high commission in Accra.
Lesotho	11 April 2006	Both countries established diplomatic relations on April 11, 2006.; Both countries are full members of the Commonwealth of Nations.
Libya	15 June 1965	see Libya–Malta relations: Both countries established diplomatic relations soon after Malta's independence.; Libya has an embassy in Balzan.; Malta has an embassy in Tripoli.; Malta has enjoyed cordial relations with Libya ever since its Independence. In 1984, a Treaty of Friendship and Co-operation was signed with Gaddafi's regime by Dom Mintoff. This treaty included a security protocol in which Libyan forces agreed to train and arm their Maltese counterparts. Libya supplied Malta with refined crude oil starting in 1975. Libyan nationals did not require visas to enter Malta until 2004.
Tunisia	20 December 1967	Both countries established official diplomatic relations soon after Malta's independence.; Malta has an embassy in Tunis.; Tunisia has an embassy in Valletta.; Both countries are full members of the Union for the Mediterranean.; Tunisian Foreign Affairs Ministry about relations with Malta; Malta and Tunisia are discussing the commercial exploitation of the continental shelf between their countries, particularly for oil exploration; Maltese and Tunisian Arabic are very similar languages. The two countries share very rich historical links.
Uganda	21 July 2004	Both countries established diplomatic relations on July 21, 2004.; Both countries are full members of the Commonwealth of Nations.

=== Americas ===
Country	Formal Relations Began	Notes
Argentina	28 May 1975	Argentina is accredited to Malta from its embassy in Rome, Italy.; Malta is accredited to Argentina from its Ministry of Foreign Affairs in Valletta and maintains an honorary consulate in Buenos Aires.
Brazil	23 June 1975	Brazil is accredited to Malta from its embassy in Rome, Italy and maintains an honorary consulate in Valletta.; Malta has an embassy in Brasília.
Canada	21 December 1964	See Canada–Malta relations: Canada is accredited to Malta from its embassy in Rome, Italy and maintains an honorary consulate in Valletta.; Malta has a high commission in Ottawa, and maintains a consulate-general in Toronto and honorary consulates in Quebec City, St. John's, and Edmonton.; A substantial Maltese diaspora exists in Canada.; Both countries are full members of the Commonwealth of Nations.
Chile	11 December 1989	In July 2017, Maltese President Marie-Louise Coleiro Preca paid an official visit to Chile.: Chile is accredited to Malta from its embassy in Rome, Italy and maintains an honorary consulate in Valletta.; Malta is accredited to Chile from its embassy in Brasília, Brazil.
Guyana	12 March 1976	Both countries established diplomatic relations on March 12, 1976.; Both countries are full members of Commonwealth of Nations
Mexico	29 October 1975	Mexico is accredited to Malta from its embassy in Rome, Italy and maintains an honorary consulate in Valletta.; Malta is accredited to Mexico from its embassy in Washington, D.C., United States.
Saint Vincent and the Grenadines	10 December 2004	Both countries established diplomatic relations on December 10, 2004.; Both countries are full members of the Commonwealth of Nations.
Trinidad and Tobago	24 September 2009	Both countries established diplomatic relations on September 24, 2009.; Both countries are full members of the Commonwealth of Nations.
United States	21 September 1964	See Malta–United States relations Malta and the United States established full diplomatic relations upon Malta's independence in 1964; overall relations are currently active and cordial. The United States has been sympathetic to Malta's campaign to attract private investment, and some firms operating in Malta have U.S. ownership or investment. These include major hotels, manufacturing and repair facilities, and some offices servicing local and regional operations.: Malta has an embassy in Washington, D.C.; United States has an embassy in Ta' Qali.

=== Asia ===
Country	Formal Relations Began	Notes
Armenia	7 June 1993	Armenia is represented in Malta through its embassy in Rome.; Malta is represented in Armenia through its embassy in Warsaw, Poland and has an honorary consulate in Yerevan.
China	31 January 1972	see China–Malta relations
Georgia	26 February 1993	Georgia is represented in Malta through its embassy in Rome (Italy).; Malta is represented in Georgia through its embassy in Moscow (Russia).; Both countries are full members of the Organization for Security and Co-operation in Europe and of Council of Europe.; Georgian Ministry of Foreign Affairs about the relation with Malta
India	10 March 1965	see India–Malta relations: Malta opened a high commission in New Delhi in 2007.; India opened a high commission in Malta at St Venera in early 2018.; Both countries are full members of the Commonwealth of Nations.
Iran		Iran is accredited to Malta from its embassy in Rome, Italy.; Malta is represented in Iran through a non-resident ambassador based in Valletta (in the Foreign Ministry).
Israel	1 December 1965	Malta has an embassy in Tel Aviv.; Both countries are full members of the Union for the Mediterranean.; See also Maltese Jews.; In December 2015, Israel singled Malta and five other EU countries for sanctions because they supported a decision that goods made in Jewish communities in the West Bank and the Golan Heights should be specially marked.
Kyrgyzstan	19 February 1993	Both countries established diplomatic relations on February 19, 1993.; Both countries are full members of the Organization for Security and Co-operation in Europe.
Pakistan	January 1966	Malta is represented in Pakistan through its embassy in Beijing (China) and an honorary consulate in Karachi. Pakistan is represented in Malta through its embassy in Tripoli (Libya) and an honorary consulate in Marsa. Both countries are full members of the Commonwealth of Nations.
Saudi Arabia	1 September 1975	Malta has an embassy in Riyadh and an honorary consulate in Jeddah.; Saudi Arabia is represented through its embassy in Rome (Italy).
South Korea	April 2, 1965	The establishment of diplomatic relations between the Republic of Korea and Malta began on April 2, 1965.: On the occasion of the 50th anniversary of diplomatic relations] in 2015 President Park Geun-hye exchanged celebratory messages with Maltese President Marie Louise Coleiro Preca; Bilateral Trade in 2014; Exports 1,014,000,000 US dollars; Imports 514,000,000 US dollars; Bilateral Investments(2014): South Korea's investment in Malta was 31,490,000 US dollars; Malta's investment in South Korea was 5,883,000,000 US dollars
Tajikistan	25 September 2007	Both countries established diplomatic relations on September 25, 2007.; Both countries are full members of the Organization for Security and Co-operation in Europe.
Turkey	10 October 1967	See Malta–Turkey relations: Malta has an embassy in Ankara and a consulate-general in Istanbul.; Turkey has an embassy in Valletta.; Both countries are full members of the Council of Europe, the World Trade Organization and the Union for the Mediterranean. Also, Malta is an EU member and Turkey is a candidate.; Turkish Ministry of Foreign Affairs about relations with Malta

=== Europe ===
Country	Formal Relations Began	Notes
Austria	9 November 1966	Austria is represented in Malta through an honorary consulate in Ta' Xbiex.; Malta has an embassy in Vienna and 4 honorary consulates (in Innsbruck, Linz, Salzburg and Vienna).; Both countries are full members of the European Union.; Austria Ministry of Foreign Affairs: List of bilateral treaties between both countries (in German only); Direction of the Austrian honorary consulate in Ta' Xbiex; Directions of the Maltese representation in Austria
Belarus	16 February 1993	Belarus is represented in Malta through its embassy in Rome (Italy).; Malta is represented in Belarus through its embassy in Moscow (Russia).
Belgium	June 1965	Both countries established diplomatic relations soon after Malta's independence.; Belgium has an honorary consulate in Valletta.; Malta has an embassy in Brussels and an honorary consulate in Antwerp.; Both countries are full members of the European Union.
Bulgaria	11 September 1971	Bulgaria is represented in Malta through its embassy in Rome (Italy).; Malta has 2 honorary consulates in Bulgaria (in Sofia and Varna).; Malta joined the European Union as a full member on May 1, 2004, while Bulgaria joined on January 1, 2007.
Croatia	30 June 1992	Croatia is represented in Malta through it embassy in Rome (Italy).; Malta is represented in Croatia through its general embassy in Valletta (Malta) and 2 honorary consulate in Zagreb and Split.; Malta joined the European Union as a full member on May 1, 2004, while Croatia joined on July 1, 2013.; Croatian Ministry of Foreign Affairs: list of bilateral treaties with Malta; Malta Ministry of Foreign Affairs about relations with Croatia
Cyprus	13 September 1972	See Cyprus–Malta relations: The two countries share membership of the European Union and the Commonwealth of Nations.; Cyprus is represented to Malta through its accredited embassy in Rome (Italy).; Malta is represented to Cyprus through its accredited embassy in Athens (Greece).; The political relations are close due to similarities between the 2 countries (on historical, economical and regional).; List of Treaties between the 2 countries by the Ministry of Foreign Affairs of Cyprus
Czech Republic	10 July 1968 and 1 January 1993	The Czech Republic is represented in Malta through its embassy in Rome, (Italy) and through an honorary consulate in Valletta.; Malta is represented in the Czech Republic through a non-resident ambassador based in the Foreign Ministry at Valletta.; Both countries are full members of the European Union.
Denmark	26 March 1969	Denmark is represented in Malta through its embassy in Rome (Italy) and through an honorary general consulate in Valletta.; Malta has 3 honorary consulates in Aarhus, Copenhagen and Odense. It formerly was represented by an embassy in Copenhagen, but this closed in 2015 - it is now accredited to the embassy in The Hague.; Both countries are full members of the European Union.
Estonia	1 January 1992	Malta recognised Estonia on August 26, 1991.; Estonia is represented in Malta through its embassy in Rome (Italy).; Malta is represented in Estonia through a non-resident embassy based in Valletta (in the Foreign Affairs Ministry) and through an honorary consulate in Tallinn.; Both countries are full members of the European Union.; Estonian Ministry of Foreign Affairs about relations with Malta
Finland	21 February 1969	See Finland–Malta relations: Finland is represented in Malta through its embassy in Rome (Italy) and an honorary consulate in Valletta.; Malta is represented in Finland through a non-resident ambassador based in Valletta (in the Ministry of Foreign Affairs) and an honorary consulate in Helsinki.; Both countries are full members of the European Union.
France	21 September 1964	The two countries share membership of the European Union.; France has an embassy in Malta.; The president of France, Nicolas Sarkozy went to Malta on a private trip just after his election in May 2007.; French Foreign Ministry about relations with Malta
Germany	16 February 1965	See Germany–Malta relations: Germany opened an embassy in Valletta in 1965.; Malta has an embassy in Berlin.; German Foreign Ministry about relations with Malta; Both countries are full members of the European Union.
Greece	30 April 1966	See Greece–Malta relations: Greece has an embassy in Valletta.; Malta has an embassy in Athens.; Both countries are full members of the European Union.
Holy See	15 December 1965	The Holy See has a nunciature in Rabat.; Malta has an embassy to the Holy See located in Rome.
Hungary	12 December 1970	Hungary is represented in Malta through its embassy in Rome, Italy and through an honorary consulate in Valletta.; Malta is represented in Hungary through its embassy in Vienna, Austria and through an honorary consulate in Budapest.; Both countries are full members of the European Union.
Iceland	3 July 1998	Both countries established diplomatic relations on July 3, 1998.
Ireland	13 June 1990	Ireland has an embassy in Ta' Xbiex.; Malta has an embassy in Dublin and two honorary consulates (Dublin and Cork).; Both countries are full members of the European Union and of the Union for the Mediterranean.; The Irish Defence Forces trains officer cadets of the Armed Forces of Malta (AFM)
Italy		See Italy–Malta relations: Both countries established official diplomatic relations soon after Malta's independence.; Italy has an embassy in Valletta.; Malta has an embassy in Rome and 18 honorary consulates (in Bari, Bologna, Brescia, Cagliari, Catania, Genoa, Livorno, Milan, Naples, Palermo, Perugia, Reggio Calabria, Savona, Syracuse, Turin, Trieste, and Venice).; Both countries are full members of the European Union and of the Union for the Mediterranean.
Kosovo	22 September 2011	Kosovo declared its independence from Serbia on February 17, 2008, and Malta recognised it on August 21, 2008.; Kosovo and Malta established diplomatic relations on September 22, 2011.
Lithuania	7 February 1994	Malta is represented in Lithuania through a non-resident ambassador based in Valletta (in the Ministry of Foreign Affairs) and an honorary consulate in Vilnius.; Lithuania is represented in Malta through its embassy in Rome (Italy) and an honorary consulate in Valletta.; Both countries are full members of the European Union.; Lithuanian Ministry of Foreign affairs: list of bilateral treaties with Malta (in Lithuanian only)
Moldova	3 July 1996	Malta is represented in Moldova through a non-resident embassy based in Valletta (in the Foreign Affairs Ministry).; Moldova is represented in Malta through its embassy in Rome (Italy).; Moldovan Ministry of Foreign Affairs and European Integration about the relation with Malta
Netherlands	1965	See Malta–Netherlands relations: The Netherlands have an embassy in Valletta.; Malta has an embassy in The Hague and 2 honorary consulates (in Amsterdam and Breda).; Both countries are full members of the European Union.; Dutch Ministry of Foreign Affairs about relations with Malta (in Dutch)
North Macedonia	25 January 2017	Both countries established diplomatic relations on January 25, 2017.
Poland		See Malta–Poland relations: Malta has an embassy in Warsaw.; Poland has an embassy in Valletta.; Both countries became members of the European Union on 1 May 2004.
Portugal	November 1968	See Malta–Portugal relations: Malta has an embassy in Lisbon and 4 honorary consulates (in Algarve, Azores, Lisbon and Porto).; Portugal has an embassy and an honorary consulate in Valletta.; Both countries are full members of the European Union and of the Union for the Mediterranean.
Romania	7 June 1968	Malta has an honorary consulate in Bucharest.; Romania has a non-resident embassy for Malta in Rome (Italy) and an honorary consulate in Valletta.; Both countries are full members of the European Union.; Malta joined the European Union as a full member on May 1, 2004, while Romania joined on January 1, 2007.
Russia	26 July 1967	See Malta–Russia relations: Malta has an embassy in Moscow and an honorary consulate in Saint Petersburg.; Russia has an embassy in San Ġwann.; Coordination Board of Russian Compatriots in Malta
Serbia	4 June 1968	See Malta–Serbia relations: Malta is represented in Serbia through a non-resident ambassador based in Valletta (in the Foreign Ministry).; Serbia is represented in Malta through its embassy in Rome (Italy) and through an honorary consulate in Valletta.; Malta is an EU member and Serbia is an EU candidate.
Slovakia	1 January 1993	See Malta–Slovakia relations: Malta is represented in Slovakia through a non-resident ambassador based in Valletta (in the Foreign Ministry).; Slovakia is represented in Malta through its embassy in Rome (Italy) and an honorary consulate in Valletta.; Both countries are full members of the European Union.; The foreign relations between Malta and Slovakia are not very intensive. Foreign policy of Malta is concentrated rather on cooperation with Algeria, Tunis, Libya and Egypt. There is, however, 41 years lasting cooperation between those two countries.; In 2001 Slovak prime minister Mikuláš Dzurinda visited Malta at the invitation of Maltese premier Edward Fenech Adami, and negotiated the integration of both countries into European Union and economic cooperation between Malta and Slovakia.; In 2008 Slovak agency SARIA signed a treaty of reciprocal assistance related to third-world countries, with Malta Enterprise.; Slovak prime minister Robert Fico visited Maltese capital Valletta in 2008.
Slovenia	29 June 1992	See Malta–Slovenia relations: Malta has an honorary consulate in Ljubljana.; Slovenia is represented through its embassy in Rome, Italy and through an honorary consulate in Valletta.; Both countries are members of the European Union and the Union for the Mediterranean.
Spain	10 October 1968	See Malta–Spain relations: Malta has an embassy in Madrid and 5 honorary consulates (in Barcelona, Palma de Mallorca, Santander, Seville and Valencia).; Spain has an embassy in Valletta.; Both countries are full members of the European Union and of the Union for the Mediterranean.
Sweden	June 1969	Malta is represented in Sweden through its embassy in Copenhagen (Denmark) and through 2 honorary consulates (in Malmö and Sundsvall).; Sweden is represented in Malta through a non-resident ambassador (based in the Foreign Ministry in Stockholm) and through an honorary consulate in Valletta.; Both countries are full members of the European Union.
Ukraine	5 March 1992	See Malta–Ukraine relations: The Maltese embassy in Moscow (Russia) is also accredited as a non-resident embassy to Ukraine.; Ukraine is represented in Malta through its embassy in Rome (Italy).
United Kingdom	21 September 1964	See Malta–United Kingdom relations Malta established diplomatic relations with the United Kingdom on 21 September 1964.: Malta maintains a high commission in London.; The United Kingdom is accredited to Malta through its high commission in Valletta.; The UK governed Malta from 1800 until 1964, when it achieved full independence. Both countries share common membership of the Commonwealth, the Council of Europe, the International Criminal Court, the OSCE, and the World Trade Organization. Bilaterally the two countries have a Bilateral Cooperation Framework, and a Double Taxation Convention.

=== Oceania ===
Country	Formal Relations Began	Notes
Australia	21 September 1964	see Australia–Malta relations Both countries have full embassy level diplomatic relations since 1967. Australia has a High Commission in Valletta. Malta has a High Commission in Canberra, 2 Consulates-General (in Melbourne and Sydney), and 4 honorary consulates (in Adelaide, Ascot Vale, Melbourne and Perth). Maltese president Eddie Fenech Adami embarked on a state visit to Australia in February 2009, where he met with Governor-General Quentin Bryce and Australian Prime Minister Kevin Rudd. During an official dinner in honour of the Maltese President, Kevin Rudd declared "Australia would not be as complete without Malta". In the same month, Maltese Deputy Prime Minister and Foreign Affairs Minister Tonio Borg visited Australia for discussions with Australian foreign minister Stephen Smith, where the commercial relationship between the two countries were discussed, in particular the signing of a contract between a Perth-based shipbuilding company and the Maltese armed forces for the construction and delivery of four inshore patrol craft.

== Malta and the Commonwealth of Nations ==
Malta has been a member state of the Commonwealth of Nations since 1964, when it became an independent Dominion under the name 'State of Malta'.

Malta became a republic in the Commonwealth of Nations on December 13, 1974, when the last Governor-General of Malta, Sir Anthony Mamo became the first President of Malta.

== FOSS Membership ==
Malta has been a member of the Forum of Small States (FOSS) since the group's founding in 1992.

== See also ==
- List of diplomatic missions in Malta
- List of diplomatic missions of Malta
- Ministry of Foreign Affairs (Malta)
