= Malta–Ukraine relations =

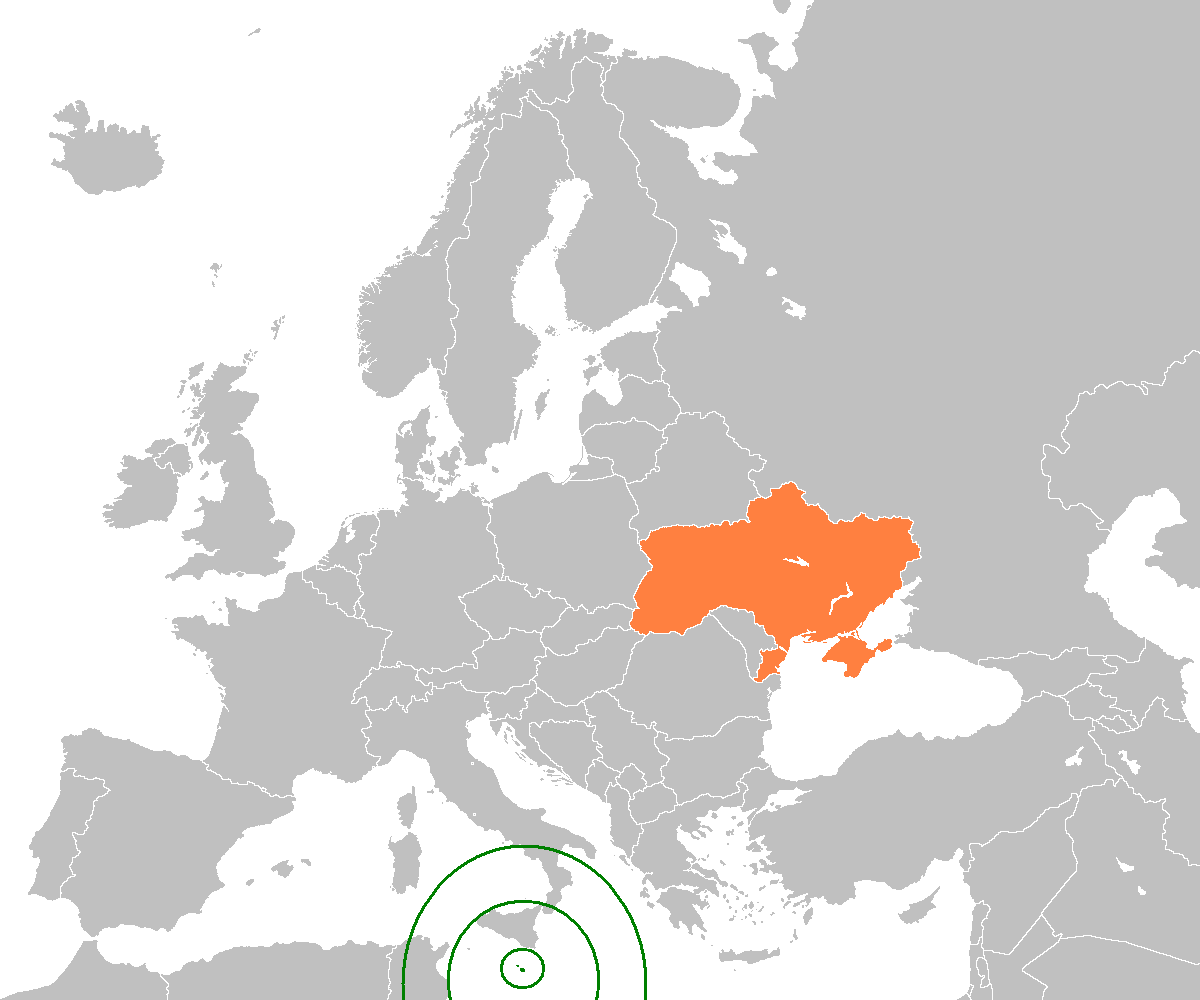
- Malta: Ukraine

Malta–Ukraine relations are foreign relations between Malta and Ukraine. The Maltese embassy in Moscow (Russia) is also accredited as a non resident embassy to Ukraine. Ukraine is represented in Malta through its embassy in Rome (Italy). Malta is a member of the EU, which Ukraine applied for in 2022.

== Relations ==
In July 2008, Maltese President Eddie Fenech Adami and Ukrainian President Viktor Yushchenko met and issued a joint statement indicating a desire for further development of relations between the two countries. They also discussed trade prospects and liberalization of visa regime.

Malta is ready to support Ukraine in its efforts for political and economic reform in conformity with European Union agreed standards. In July 2008, the Maltese President spoke of Malta's experience in the process leading to and including EU membership: restructuring to conform to EU standards.

During the 2022 Russian invasion of Ukraine, the Government of Malta sent €1.15 million worth of medicines and medical equipment to Ukraine. By 21 April 2022, 337 Ukrainian refugees have been granted protection status in Malta. As of 20 June 2022, 1,002 Ukrainians arrived in Malta in the last three months and were granted refugee status.

== Agreements ==
In July 2008, the two presidents signed two cooperation agreements in fighting organized crime and in tourism. The two countries also have an agreement on education and culture.

== See also ==
- Foreign relations of Malta
- Foreign relations of Ukraine
- Ukraine-EU relations
  - Accession of Ukraine to the EU
