= Malta–Russia relations =

- Malta: Russia

Malta–Russia relations refers to bilateral foreign relations between Malta and Russia. Malta has an embassy in Moscow and an honorary consulate in Saint Petersburg. The current Ambassador of Malta to Russia is H.E. Mr Carmelo Inguanez.

Russia has an embassy in San Ġwann and cultural centre in Valletta.

== History ==
Relations between the two countries were established in 1698 by Ramon Perellos y Roccaful, the Grand Master of the Order of St. John, exactly a century before the Order's expulsion from Malta.

From 1799 to 1800, the Russian Empire supported Maltese rebels against the French occupation of Malta.

In October 2016, Malta refused to refuel Russian warships that were on their way to participate in the war in Syria, leading in 2017 to concerns amongst intelligence services over possible Russian interference in the 2017 Maltese general election. Increased cyber attacks took place against government systems in the run up to the election.

After the 2022 Russian invasion of Ukraine started, Malta, as one of the EU countries, imposed sanctions on Russia, and Russia added all EU countries to the list of "unfriendly nations".

In March 2022, Malta ceased selling passports to Russian and Belarusian citizens and later revoked a number of golden passports already issued. In October 2023, a two-day Ukrainian peace event was held in Malta with 66 countries participating. This was the third in a series, the first two being similar meetings in Jeddah, Saudi Arabia, and Copenhagen, Denmark. Russia did not attend and a Russian foreign ministry spokesperson, Maria Zakharova, criticised Malta for hosting a "blatantly anti-Russian event."

== Trade ==
In 2021, Russia exported $2.1 billion of goods to Malta with $1.98 billion of refined fuel being the top product, Maltese exports were $17m in 2021. In 1995, Russian exports were $10m and have increased at an average of 22.7% per annum to 2021.

Malta's imports from Russia fell by 68% in 2022. In February 2023, the European Union (EU) banned Russian refined oil, further decreasing Malta's trade with Russia.

== Gallery ==
Russian embassy and cultural centre in Malta
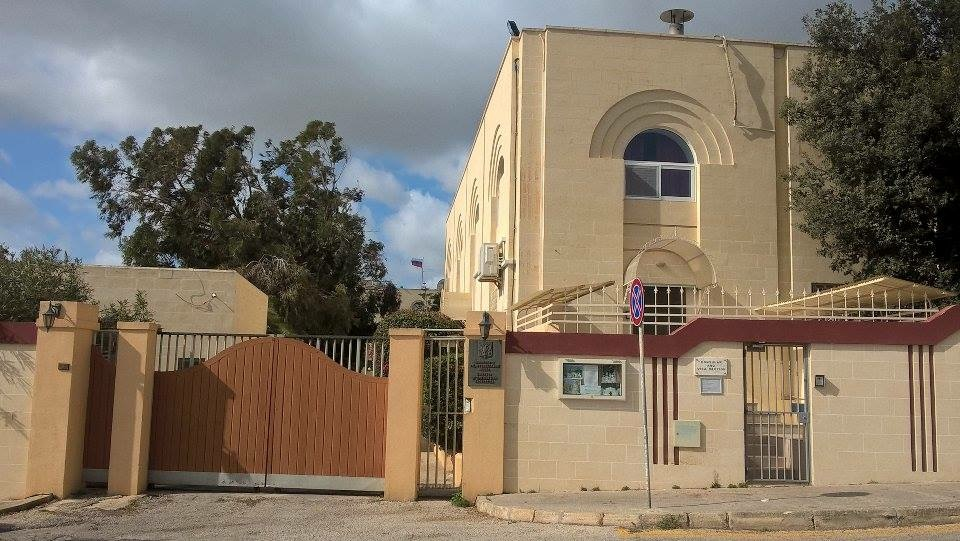
Embassy of Russia in San Ġwann, Malta

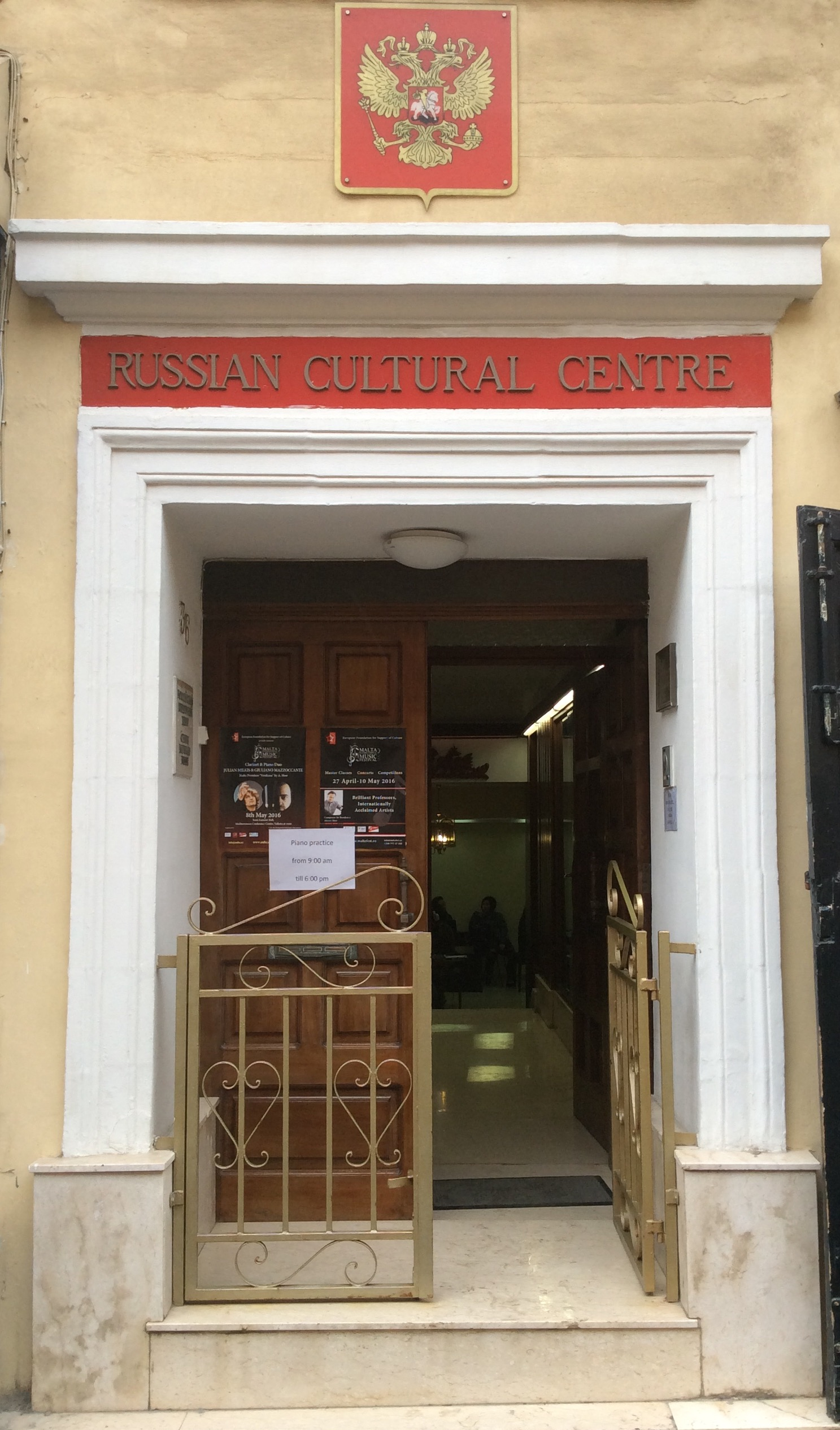
Russian Cultural Centre in Valletta, Malta

== See also ==
- Foreign relations of Malta
- Foreign relations of Russia
- List of ambassadors of Russia to Malta
