= Malta Enterprise =

Government exclusive agency

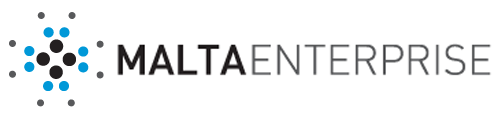
Malta Enterprise Logo

Malta Enterprise is an agency owned by the Maltese Government which focuses on attracting foreign investments as well as promoting and facilitating the growth of current businesses in Malta.

It is a national contact point for the “Enterprise Europe Network” which allows companies based in Malta to connect with similar businesses in around 60 countries. It aims to guide government policies and create constant interaction with economic enterprises found in Malta.

== History ==
Malta Enterprise is the national development agency of Malta which is responsible for promoting and supporting the country's economic development. The agency started off as the Malta Development Corporation (MDC), which was established in 1967. Over the years, the MDC played a crucial role in Malta's economic progress and development. It was thanks to these efforts that we saw the growth of various industries and attracting foreign investment to the island.

In January 2004, the MDC was replaced by Malta Enterprise, which continued to build on the product of its predecessor. Today, Malta Enterprise is responsible for implementing policies and creating initiatives aimed at promoting economic growth, innovation in the Maltese islands. The agency works closely with the private sector, educational institutions, as well as other stakeholders to create an environment that fosters entrepreneurship, innovation, and job creation.

== Functions ==
Malta Enterprise helps clients with the use of various schemes, which are developed to help promote and expand enterprises and start-ups of different sizes. Some of the schemes launched by Malta Enterprise include, Business Development, Business Start, Skills Development, Smart & Sustainable Investment Grant, and Microinvest.

== Structure ==
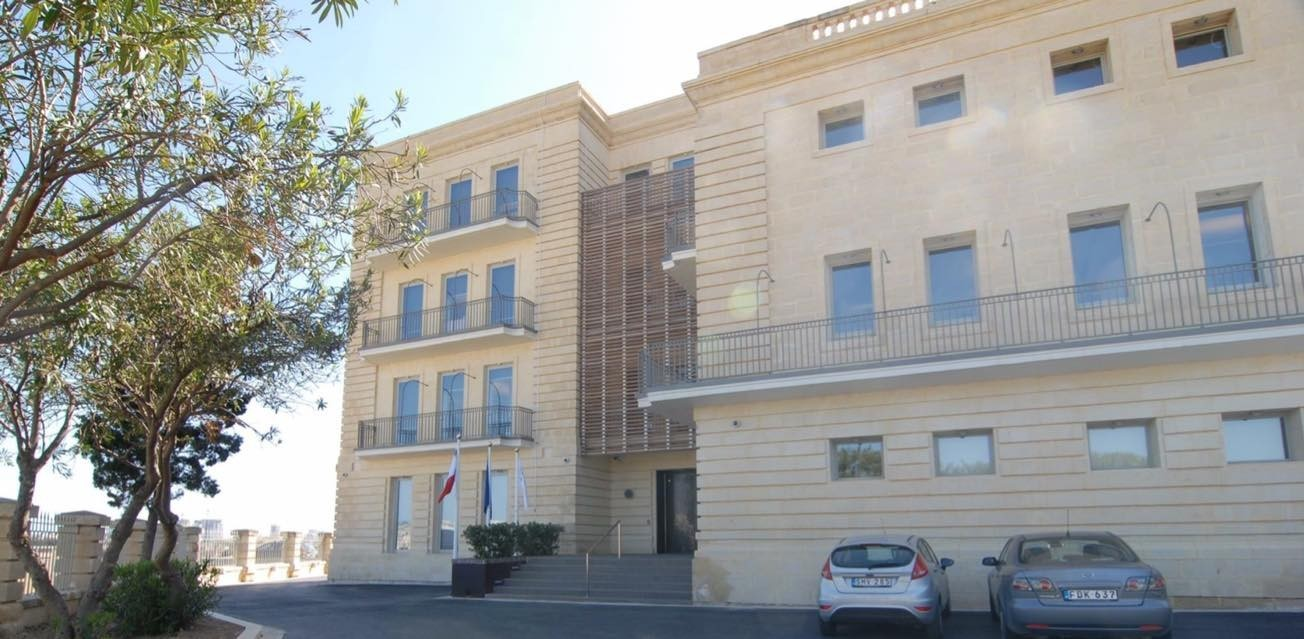
Malta Enterprise Head Office - Pieta

George Gregory is the CEO of Malta Enterprise. Prior to his appointment he was the Managing Partner of one of Malta’s largest accountancy firm and was in the profession for more than 30 years, working in a variety of sectors.

The Chairman of Malta Enterprise is William Wait and the Board of Directors are as follows, Mr. Andre Psaila, Ms. Roberta Albanese Dalli, Mr. Beppe Muscat, Mr. Christopher Vassallo Cesareo, Ms. Jessica Camilleri, Mr. Michael Grech, Dr. Michele Cardinali, Mr. Brian Muscat, Mr. Terry Zammit.

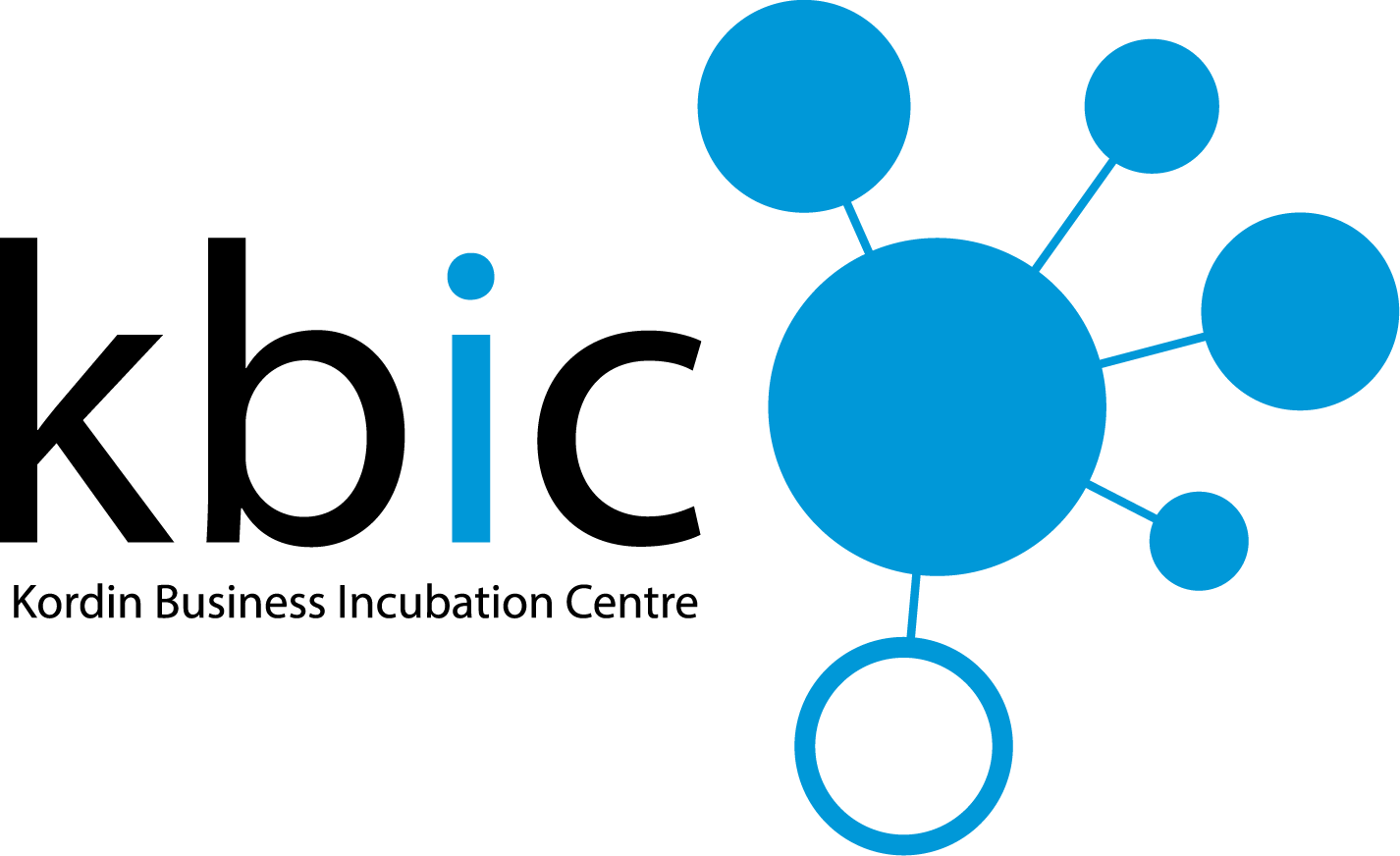
Kordin Business Centre Logo

Different Branches of Malta Enterprise

- Kordin Business Incubation Centre (KBIC)

Malta Enterprise has managed KBIC for twenty-three years. This Centre focuses industrial activities with innovative products and services like economic activities such as manufacturing, life sciences, digital games, 3D printing, research & development. All this done with a link to the creative industries, and digital based industries

KBIC has hosted start ups in a number of sectors and stages, These economic sectors include additive manufacturing, precision engineering, digital games, forensics, restoration works, pharmaceuticals, quality inspection, audio-visual activities, aviation, maritime services, film industry, and digital archiving, amongst others.

- Business First

Business’s first primary contact is with the government, for business and entrepreneurs. This enables them to carry out all their required procedures for setting up and running the business. B1st is an information point for Government services which relate to the development of a business

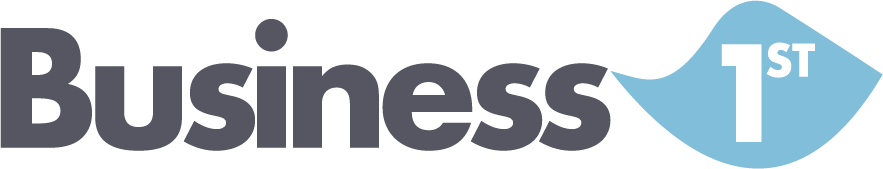

They are a one stop shop for businesses, including start ups and individuals which desire to become entrepreneurs. They relay information on all incentives offered by the Government.

- Malta Life Sciences Park (MLSP)

It was developed by Malta Enterprise in order to provide a facility for technological advancements and life sciences. This organisation promotes research and development to expand the pharmaceutical industry. It aims to advance the growth of the life sciences sector in Malta.

MLSP offers services to all businesses in several different stages. MLSP offers assistance for internationalisation and financial advice. It is further divided into the Life Sciences Centre and the Digital Hub.

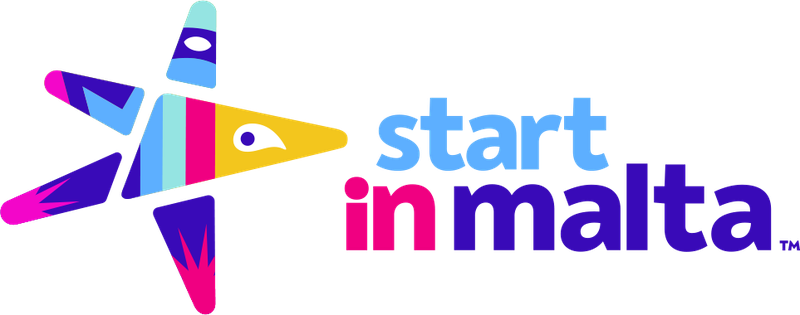
Start in Malta

== Start in Malta ==
Start in Malta is Malta Enterprise’s dedicated brand aimed to advance the start-up ecosystem, by building a community through events like the Start-up Festival as well as offering further incentives and schemes.

A part of the Start in Malta brand which is dedicated to the Start Up festival, is focused on showcasing the different start-ups and scale-ups that are found in Malta.

The brand focuses on how to attract different companies who are ready to launch themselves and their companies on the Maltese islands. This is all done to continue to grow the economic market as well as offer further innovation.
