= European Union–NATO relations =

- European Union: NATO

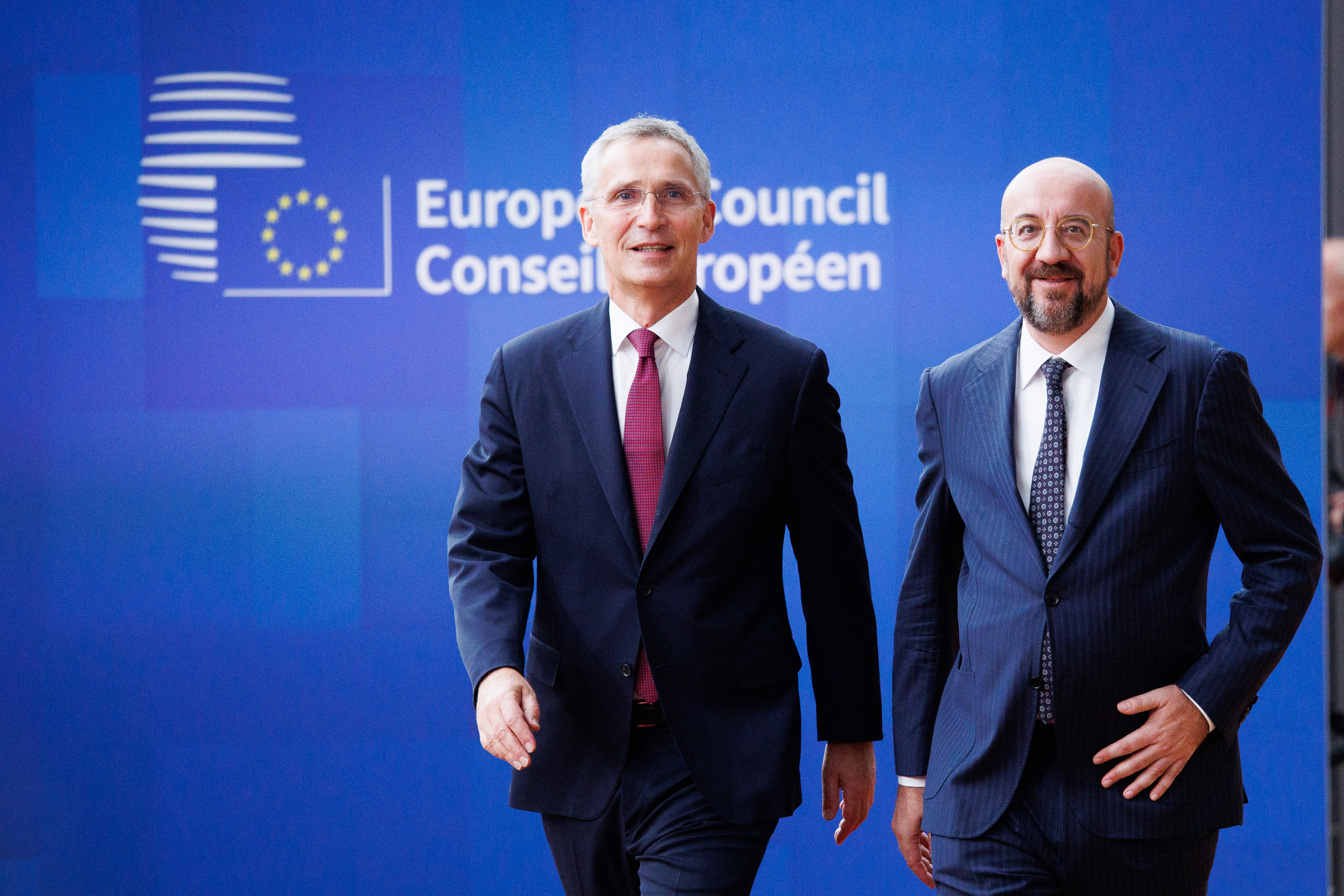
then-NATO Secretary General Jens Stoltenberg meet with then-President of the European Council Charles Michel in Brussels, 29 June 2023

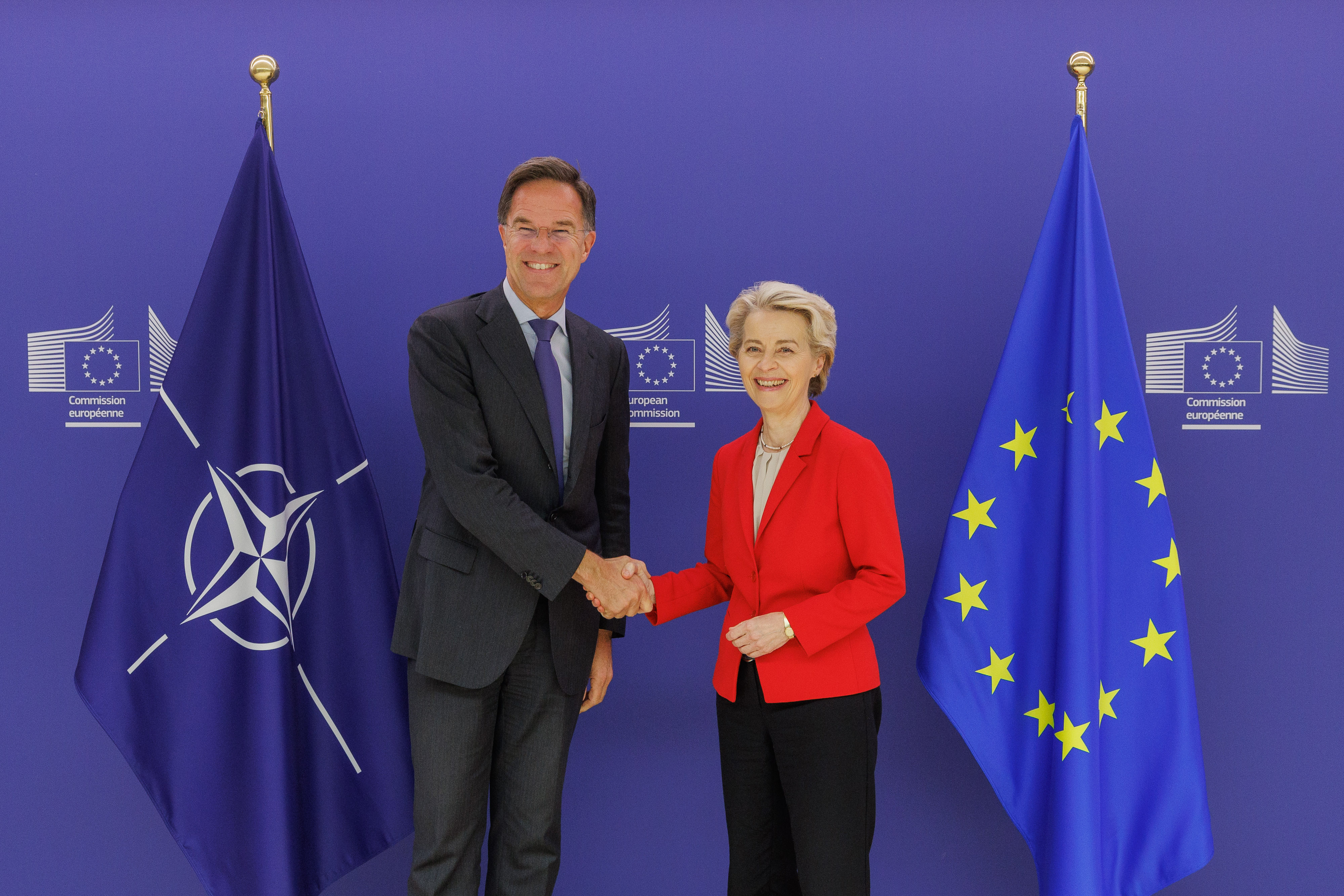
NATO Secretary General Mark Rutte with President of the European Commission Ursula von der Leyen in Brussels, 29 October 2024

The European Union (EU) and the North Atlantic Treaty Organisation (NATO) are two main treaty-based Western organisations for cooperation between member states, both headquartered in Brussels, Belgium. Their natures are different and they operate in different spheres: NATO is a purely intergovernmental organisation functioning as a military alliance, which serves to implement article 5 of the North Atlantic Treaty on collective territorial defence. The EU on the other hand is a partly supranational and partly intergovernmental sui generis entity akin to a confederation that entails wider economic and political integration. Unlike NATO, the EU pursues a foreign policy in its own right—based on consensus, and member states have equipped it with tools in the field of defence and crisis management; the Common Security and Defence Policy (CSDP) structure.

The memberships of the EU and NATO are distinct, and some EU member states are traditionally neutral on defence issues. The EU and NATO have respectively 27 and 32 member states, of which 23 are members of both. Another four NATO members are EU applicants—Albania, Montenegro, North Macedonia, and Turkey—and another one, the United Kingdom, is a former EU member. Iceland and Norway have opted to remain outside of the EU, but do participate in the European Single Market as part of their European Economic Area (EEA) membership. Four non-NATO states are members of the EU: Austria, Cyprus, Ireland, and Malta. Several EU and NATO member states were formerly members of the Warsaw Pact.

The EU has its own mutual defence clause in Articles 42(7) and 222 of the Treaty on European Union (TEU) and the Treaty on the Functioning of the European Union (TFEU), respectively. The CSDP command and control structure is however much smaller than the NATO Command Structure (NCS), and the extent to which the CSDP should evolve to form a full defence arm for the EU that is able to implement the EU mutual defence clause in its own right is a point of contention. The United Kingdom (UK) had objected to this, when it was still an EU member state. At the UK's insistence in the negotiations leading to the Treaty of Lisbon, Article 42.2 of TEU specified that NATO shall be the main forum for the implementation of collective self-defence for EU member states that are also NATO members.

The 2002 Berlin Plus agreement and 2018 Joint Declaration provide for cooperation between the EU and NATO, including that NCS resources may be used for the conduct of the EU's CSDP missions.

== History ==
Emblems of former and present European and trans-Atlantic command and control structures: Western Union Defence Organisation (WUDO, l., 1948-1952), its de facto successor: NATO's Supreme Headquarters Allied Powers Europe (SHAPE, m., 1952-present) and the EU's Military Planning and Conduct Capability (MPCC, r., 2017-present).
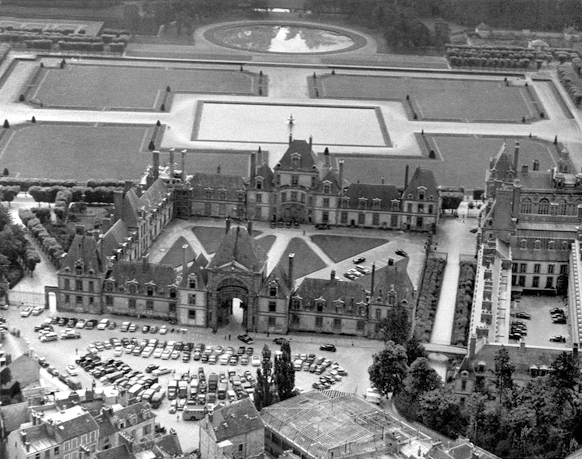
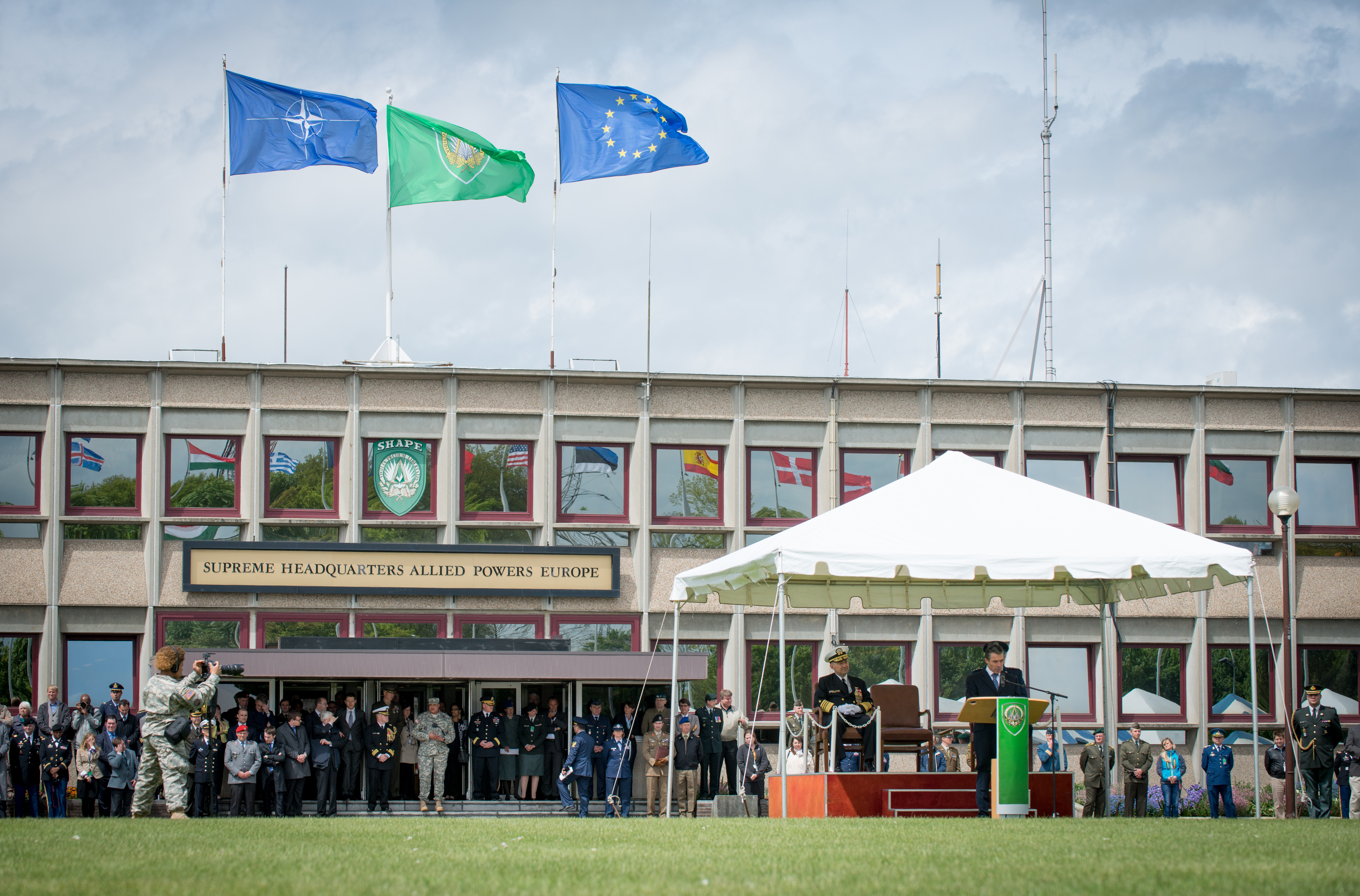
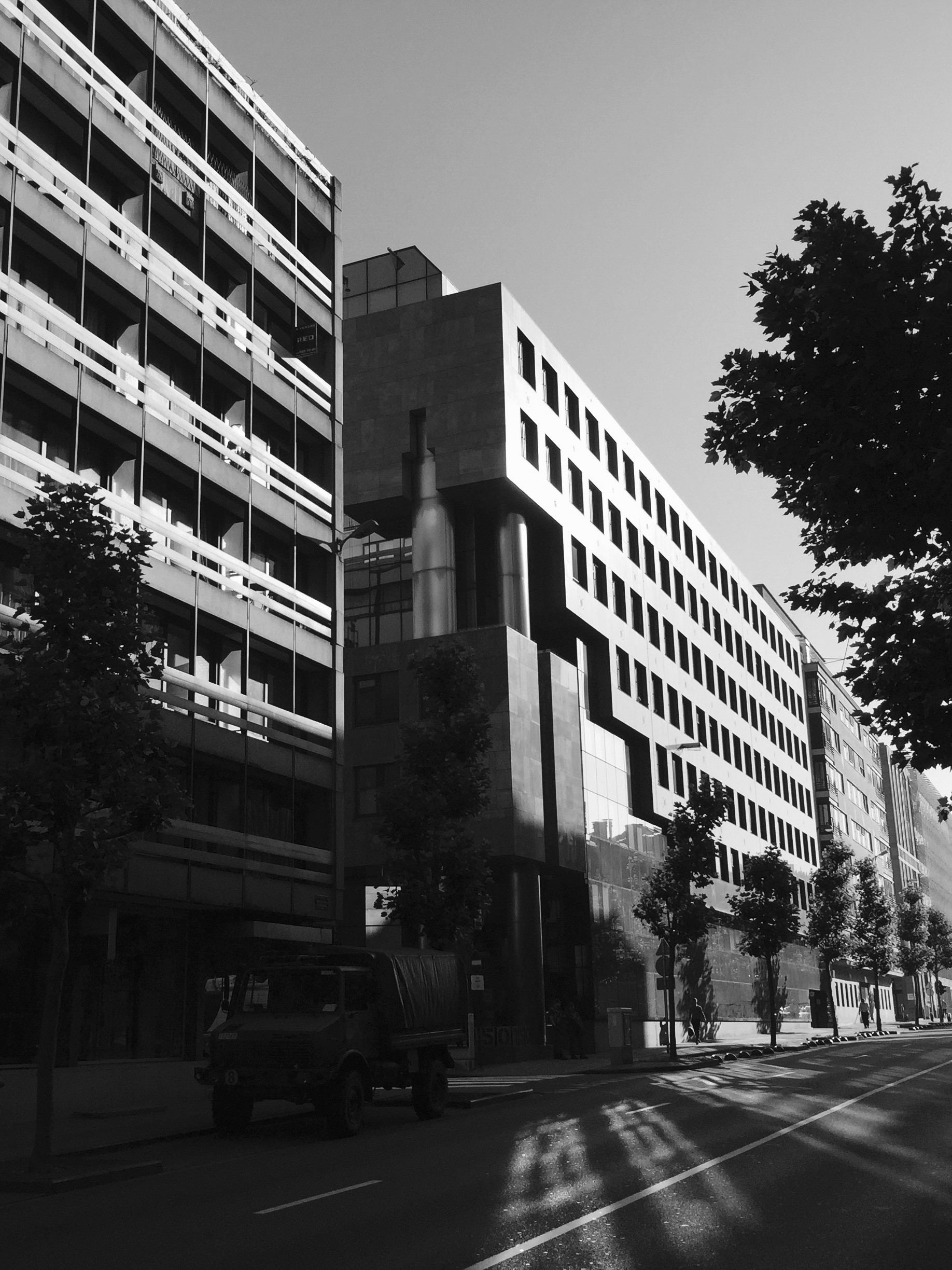
Premises of former and present European and trans-Atlantic command and control structures: WUDO (l.) in Fontainebleau, France, its de facto successor: NATO's SHAPE (m.) in Mons, Belgium, and the EU's MPCC (r.) in Brussels, Belgium.

=== 1948–1951: Common origins, where NATO cannibalises intra-European initiatives ===
The Western Union, established to implement the 1948 Treaty of Brussels signed by Belgium, France, the Netherlands, Luxembourg, and the United Kingdom, represents a precursor to both NATO and the EU's defence arm, the Common Security and Defence Policy (CSDP). WUDO's organisational chart as of November 1948, in which solid and dashed lines indicate control and liaison lines, respectively:

Consultative Council (foreign or prime ministers)
Permanent Commission (4 ambassadors in London plus Foreign Office representative)	Defence Committee (defence ministers)
Military Supply Board
Chiefs of Staff Committee (WUCOS)
Finance Committee
UN General Assembly Special Committee	Security Committee	Military Committee and Combined Staff of WUCOS	Commanders-in-Chief Committee and its Chairman
C-in-C Western Europe Land Forces	C-in-C Western Europe (Tactical) Air Force	Flag Officer Western Europe

Since the end of World War II, most sovereign European countries have entered into treaties and thereby co-operated and harmonised policies (or pooled sovereignty) in an increasing number of areas, in the European integration project or the construction of Europe (French: la construction européenne). The following timeline outlines the legal inception of the European Union (EU)—the principal framework for this unification. The EU inherited many of its present organisations, institutions, and responsibilities from the European Communities (EC), which were founded in the 1950s in the spirit of the Schuman Declaration.

Legend:
S: signing
F: entry into force
T: termination
E: expiry
de facto supersession
Rel. w/ EC/EU framework:
de facto inside
outside

European Union (EU)
[Cont.]
European Communities (EC)
(Pillar I)

European Atomic Energy Community (EAEC or EURATOM)

[Cont.]

/ / / European Coal and Steel Community (ECSC)

(Distr. of competences)

European Economic Community (EEC)

Schengen Rules
European Community (EC)
TREVI
Justice and Home Affairs (JHA, pillar III)

/ North Atlantic Treaty Organisation (NATO)
[Cont.]
Police and Judicial Co-operation in Criminal Matters (PJCC, pillar III)

Anglo-French alliance
[Defence arm handed to NATO]
European Political Co-operation (EPC)

Common Foreign and Security Policy
(CFSP, pillar II)
Western Union (WU)
/ Western European Union (WEU)
[Tasks defined following the WEU's 1984 reactivation handed to the EU]

[Social, cultural tasks handed to CoE]
[Cont.]

Council of Europe (CoE)
Entente Cordiale
S: 8 April 1904
Dunkirk Treaty (Note: Although not EU treaties per se, these treaties affected the development of the EU defence arm, a main part of the CFSP. The Franco-British alliance established by the Dunkirk Treaty was de facto superseded by WU. The CFSP pillar was bolstered by some of the security structures that had been established within the remit of the 1955 Modified Brussels Treaty (MBT). The Brussels Treaty was terminated in 2011, consequently dissolving the WEU, as the mutual defence clause that the Lisbon Treaty provided for EU was considered to render the WEU superfluous. The EU thus de facto superseded the WEU.)
S: 4 March 1947
F: 8 September 1947
E: 8 September 1997
Brussels Treaty
S: 17 March 1948
F: 25 August 1948
T: 30 June 2011
London and Washington treaties
S: 5 May/4 April 1949
F: 3 August/24 August 1949
Paris treaties: ECSC and EDC (Note: Plans to establish a European Political Community (EPC) were shelved following the French failure to ratify the Treaty establishing the European Defence Community (EDC). The EPC would have combined the ECSC and the EDC.)
S: 18 April 1951/27 May 1952
F: 23 July 1952/?
E: 23 July 2002/—
Protocol Modifying and
Completing the Brussels Treaty
S: 23 October 1954
F: 6 May 1955
Rome treaties: EEC and EAEC
S: 25 March 1957
F: 1 January 1958
WEU-CoE agreement
S: 21 October 1959
F: 1 January 1960
Brussels (Merger) Treaty (Note: The European Communities obtained common institutions and a shared legal personality (i.e. ability to e.g. sign treaties in their own right).)
S: 8 April 1965
F: 1 July 1967
Davignon report
S: 27 October 1970
European Council conclusions
S: 2 December 1975
Single European Act (SEA)
S: 17/28 February 1986
F: 1 July 1987
Schengen Agreement and Convention
S: 14 June 1985/19 June 1990
F: 26 March 1995
Maastricht Treaty (Note: The treaties of Maastricht and Rome form the EU's legal basis, and are also referred to as the Treaty on European Union (TEU) and the Treaty on the Functioning of the European Union (TFEU), respectively. They are amended by secondary treaties.) (Note: Between the EU's founding in 1993 and consolidation in 2009, the union consisted of three pillars, the first of which were the European Communities. The other two pillars consisted of additional areas of cooperation that had been added to the EU's remit.)
S: 7 February 1992
F: 1 November 1993
Amsterdam Treaty
S: 2 October 1997
F: 1 May 1999
Nice Treaty
S: 26 February 2001
F: 1 February 2003
Lisbon Treaty (Note: The consolidation meant that the EU inherited the European Communities' legal personality and that the pillar system was abolished, resulting in the EU framework as such covering all policy areas. Executive/legislative power in each area was instead determined by a distribution of competencies between EU institutions and member states. This distribution, as well as treaty provisions for policy areas in which unanimity is required and qualified majority voting is possible, reflects the depth of EU integration as well as the EU's partly supranational and partly intergovernmental nature.)
S: 13 December 2007
F: 1 December 2009

=== 1954: Failure to establish an autonomous European pillar in NATO ===
Had its founding treaty not failed to acquire ratification in the French Parliament in 1954, the European Defence Community would have entailed a pan-European military, divided into national components, and had a common budget, common arms, centralized military procurement, and institutions. The EDC would have had an integral link to NATO, forming an autonomous European pillar in the Atlantic alliance.

Diagram showing the functioning of the institutions provided for by the Treaty establishing the European Defence Community (EDC), the placing of Member States' armed forces (European Defence Forces) at the disposal of the Community, and the link between the EDC and the North Atlantic Treaty Organisation (NATO).

=== 1996–present: Tensions and mutual interests as EU gains autonomous defence structures ===
Following the establishment of the ESDI and the St. Malo declaration, US Secretary of State Madeleine Albright were among others who voiced concern that an independent European security pillar could undermine NATO, as she put forth the three famous D's:

Our [...] task is working together to develop [the ESDI] within [NATO], which the United States has strongly endorsed. We enthusiastically support any such measures that enhance European capabilities. The United States welcomes a more capable European partner, with modern, flexible military forces capable of putting out fires in Europe's own back yard and working with us through [NATO] to defend our common interests. The key to a successful initiative is to focus on practical military capabilities. Any initiative must avoid preempting [NATO] decision-making by de-linking ESDI from NATO, avoid duplicating existing efforts, and avoid discriminating against non-EU members. [...]

— US Secretary of State Albright, North Atlantic Council (8 December 1998)

== Present cooperation ==
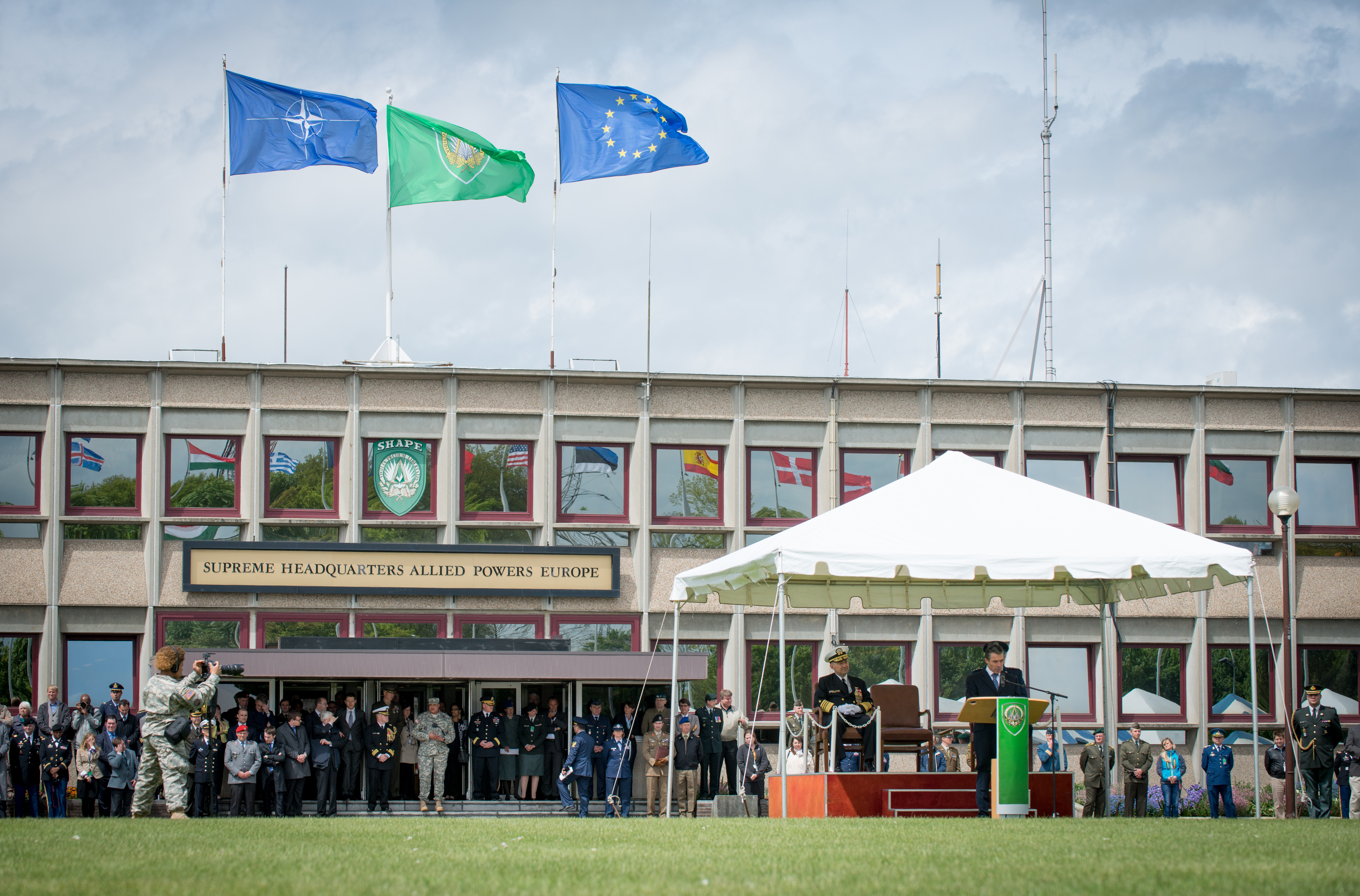
Change of command for the post of Supreme Commander Allied Forces Europe (SACEUR) at Supreme Headquarters Allied Powers Europe (SHAPE), the main headquarters of the North Atlantic Treaty Organisation's Allied Command Operations (ACO). SHAPE's main building also flies the EU flag, reflecting the Berlin Plus agreement.

The Berlin Plus agreement enables EU operations to be planned and conducted at the military strategic and operational level with recourse to assets and capabilities in the NATO Command Structure (NCS). In such an event, an Operational Headquarters (OHQ) would be set up within NATO's Supreme Headquarters Allied Powers Europe (SHAPE) in Mons, Belgium. SHAPE is the main headquarters of Allied Command Operations (ACO).

When the NCS provides the OHQ, the Deputy Supreme Allied Commander Europe (DSACEUR) acts as Operation Commander (OpCdr).

The Berlin Plus agreement requires that the use of NATO assets by the EU is subject to a "right of first refusal", i.e. NATO must first decline to intervene in a given crisis, and contingent on unanimous approval among NATO states, including those outside of the EU. For example, Turkish reservations about Operation Concordia using NATO assets delayed its deployment by more than five months.

The European External Action Service's (EEAS) Military Staff (EUMS), situated in the Kortenberg building in Brussels, has a permanent NATO liaison team and runs a permanent EU cell at NATO's Supreme Headquarters Allied Powers Europe (SHAPE) in Mons.

== Comparison ==
=== Command structures ===
The CSDP entails collective self-defence amongst member states. This responsibility is based on Article 42.7 of TEU, which states that this responsibility does not prejudice the specific character of the security and defence policy of certain member states, referring to policies of neutrality. See Neutral country§European Union for discussion on this subject. According to the Article 42.7 "If a Member State is the victim of armed aggression on its territory, the other Member States shall have towards it an obligation of aid and assistance by all the means in their power, in accordance with Article 51 of the United Nations Charter. This shall not prejudice the specific character of the security and defence policy of certain Member States." Article 42.2 furthermore specifies that NATO shall be the main forum for the implementation of collective self-defence for EU member states that are also NATO members.

The EU does not have a permanent military command structure. However it has been agreed that North Atlantic Treaty Organization (NATO) military structures may be used for the conduct of the EU's CSDP missions under the Berlin Plus agreement. The Military Planning and Conduct Capability (MPCC), established in 2017 and to be strengthened in 2020, does however represent the EU's first step in developing a permanent military OHQ. In parallel, the newly established European Defence Fund (EDF) marks the first time the EU budget is used to finance multinational defence projects.

==== European Union ====
Location of alternative OHQs for EU-led military operations: EU headquarters, NATO headquarters and national OHQs offered by member states are shown with red, blue and yellow marks, respectively

The EU command and control (C2) structure is directed by political bodies composed of member states' representatives, and generally requires unanimous decisions. As of April 2019:

Liaison: Advice and recommendations Support and monitoring Preparatory work

Political strategic level:^{[5]}
ISS	EUCO Pres. (EUCO)	Chain of command
Coordination/support
SatCen	CIVCOM	HR/VP (FAC)
INTCEN	HR/VP (PMG)	HR/VP (PSC)^{[6]}	CEUMC (EUMC)
CMPD	DGEUMS^{[3]} (EUMS)
Military/civilian strategic level:
Dir MPCC^{[3]} (MPCC)	JSCC	Civ OpCdr CPCC^{[1]}
Operational level:
MFCdr^{[4]} (MFHQ)	HoM^{[1]}
Tactical level:
CC^{[2]}Air; CC^{[2]} Land; CC^{[2]} Mar; Other CCs^{[2]} European Armed Forces

^{1} In the event of a CSDP Civilian Mission also being in the field, the relations with the Civilian Planning and Conduct Capability (CPCC) and its Civilian Operation Commander (Civ OpCdr), as well as the subordinate Head of Mission (HoM), are coordinated as shown.

^{2} Other Component Commanders (CCs) and service branches which may be established.

^{3} The MPCC is part of the EUMS and Dir MPCC is double-hatted as DGEUMS. Unless the MPCC is used as Operation Headquarters (OHQ), either a national OHQ offered by member states or the NATO Command Structure (NCS) would serve this purpose. In the latter instance, Deputy Supreme Allied Commander Europe (DSACEUR), rather than Dir MPCC, would serve as Operation Commander (OpCdr).

^{4} Unless the MPCC is used as Operation Headquarters (OHQ), the MFCdr would be known as a Force Commander (FCdr), and direct a Force Headquarters (FHQ) rather than a MFHQ. Whereas the MFHQ would act both on the operational and tactical level, the FHQ would act purely on the operational level.

^{5} The political strategic level is not part of the C2 structure per se, but represents the political bodies, with associated support facilities, that determine the missions' general direction. The Council determines the role of the High Representative (HR/VP), who serves as Vice-President of the European Commission, attends European Council meetings, chairs the Foreign Affairs Council (FAC) and may chair the Political and Security Committee (PSC) in times of crisis. The HR/VP proposes and implements CSDP decisions.

^{6} Same composition as Committee of Permanent Representatives (COREPER) II, which also prepares for the CSDP-related work of the FAC.

==== NATO ====
Locations of NATO's two strategic commands — Allied Command Transformation (ACT) with its subordinate centres (blue marks) and Allied Command Operations (ACO), headquartered at Supreme Headquarters Allied Powers Europe (SHAPE) and including its subordinate and joint force commands (red marks).

NATO's command structure, under the North Atlantic Council and the NATO Military Committee, is split into Allied Command Operations, responsible for all military operations, and Allied Command Transformation responsible for capability development.

== Membership ==
Map showing European membership of the EU and NATO EU member only NATO member only member of both

The EU's crown of stars and NATO's compass rose encircle Belgium's defence emblem

The memberships of the EU and NATO are distinct. The EU and NATO have respectively 27 and 32 member states, of which 23 states are members of both.

The four EU member states which are not members of NATO (Austria, Cyprus, Ireland and Malta) held positions of neutrality during the Cold War, which they have since maintained. However, all but Cyprus are members of NATO's Partnership for Peace. Cyprus is the only EU member state that is neither a full member of NATO nor participates in the Partnership for Peace. Any treaty concerning Cyprus' participation in NATO would likely be blocked by Turkey because of the Cyprus dispute. The 2022 Russian invasion of Ukraine reignited debate surrounding NATO membership in several countries, with Finland and Sweden both joining NATO after decades of neutrality.

Of the 32 NATO member states, 30 are European states. The 7 European states which are NATO members, but not EU members, include four states that have applied for EU membership (Albania, Montenegro, North Macedonia, and Turkey), as well as the United Kingdom which is a former EU member. The two others — Iceland and Norway — have opted to remain outside of the EU, however participate in the EU's single market.

Several EU member states were formerly members of the NATO rival Warsaw Pact.

Non-European countries
Transcontinental countries

Comparison of the two main Euro-Atlantic defence organisations
	European Union (in respect of its defence arm, the Common Security and Defence Policy)		NATO
Mutual defence clause	Article 42.7 of the consolidated version of the Treaty on European Union: "If a Member State is the victim of armed aggression on its territory, the other Member States shall have towards it an obligation of aid and assistance by all the means in their power, in accordance with Article 51 of the United Nations Charter. This shall not prejudice the specific character of the security and defence policy of certain Member States. [...]"		Article 5 of the North Atlantic Treaty: "The Parties agree that an armed attack against one or more of them [on their territory] shall be considered an attack against them all and consequently they agree that, if such an armed attack occurs, each of them, in exercise of the right of individual or collective self-defence recognised by Article 51 of the Charter of the United Nations, will assist the Party or Parties so attacked by taking forthwith, individually and in concert with the other Parties, such action as it deems necessary, including the use of armed force, to restore and maintain the security of the North Atlantic area. [...]"
	Political strategic organisation		
Highest office	High Representative (HR/VP)		Secretary General
Principal decision-making body	Foreign Affairs Council		North Atlantic Council
Liaison body	European External Action Service		International Staff
Seat	Kortenberg building (Brussels, Belgium)		NATO headquarters (Brussels, Belgium)
	Military strategic organisation		
Supreme commander	Director of the Military Planning and Conduct Capability		Supreme Allied Commander Europe
Headquarters	Military Planning and Conduct Capability (Brussels, Belgium)		Supreme Headquarters Allied Powers Europe (Mons, Belgium)
Chair of chiefs of defence assembly	Chairman of the European Union Military Committee		Chair of the NATO Military Committee
Chiefs of defence assembly	European Union Military Committee		NATO Military Committee
Advisory body	European Union Military Staff		International Military Staff
	EU Membership	Permanent Structured Cooperation	NATO Membership
Member states of both the EU and NATO
Belgium	Founder	Founder	Founder
Bulgaria	2007	Founder	2004
Croatia	2013	Founder	2009
Czech Republic	2004	Founder	1999
Denmark	1973	2023	Founder
Estonia	2004	Founder	2004
Finland	1995	Founder	2023
France	Founder	Founder	Founder
Germany	Founder	Founder	1955
Greece	1981	Founder	1952
Hungary	2004	Founder	1999
Italy	Founder	Founder	Founder
Latvia	2004	Founder	2004
Lithuania	2004	Founder	2004
Luxembourg	Founder	Founder	Founder
Netherlands	Founder	Founder	Founder
Poland	2004	Founder	1999
Portugal	1986	Founder	Founder
Romania	2007	Founder	2004
Slovakia	2004	Founder	2004
Slovenia	2004	Founder	2004
Spain	1986	Founder	1982
Sweden	1995	Founder	2024
Non-NATO EU member states
Austria	1995	Founder	Partnership for Peace
Cyprus	2004	Founder	No
Ireland	1973	Founder	Partnership for Peace
Malta	2004	No	Partnership for Peace
Non-EU NATO member states
Albania	Candidate	—N/a	2009
Iceland	No	—N/a	Founder
Montenegro	Candidate	—N/a	2017
North Macedonia	Candidate	—N/a	2020
Norway	Defence Agency agreement	—N/a	Founder
Turkey	Candidate	—N/a	1952
United Kingdom	No	—N/a	Founder
European countries outside both the EU and NATO
Andorra	No	—N/a	No
Armenia	No	—N/a	Individual Partnership Action Plan
Azerbaijan	No	—N/a	Individual Partnership Action Plan
Belarus	No	—N/a	Partnership for Peace
Bosnia and Herzegovina	Candidate	—N/a	Membership Action Plan
Georgia	Candidate	—N/a	Intensified Dialogue
Kazakhstan	No	—N/a	Individual Partnership Action Plan
Kosovo	Applicant / Potential candidate	—N/a	No
Liechtenstein	No	—N/a	No
Moldova	Candidate	—N/a	Individual Partnership Action Plan
Monaco	No	—N/a	No
Russia	No	—N/a	Partnership for Peace
San Marino	No	—N/a	No
Serbia	Candidate	—N/a	Individual Partnership Action Plan
Switzerland	Defence Agency agreement	—N/a	Partnership for Peace
Ukraine	Candidate	—N/a	Intensified Dialogue
Vatican City	No	—N/a	No
NATO member states located in North America, which are therefore ineligible for EU membership
Canada	—N/a	—N/a	Founder
United States	—N/a	—N/a	Founder
Members of NATO's Partnership for Peace located outside Europe, which are therefore neither eligible for EU nor NATO membership
Kyrgyzstan	—N/a	—N/a	Partnership for Peace
Tajikistan	—N/a	—N/a	Partnership for Peace
Turkmenistan	—N/a	—N/a	Partnership for Peace
Uzbekistan	—N/a	—N/a	Partnership for Peace

== See also ==
- United States Mission to NATO
- Foreign relations of the European Union
- Foreign relations of NATO
- United States–European Union relations
- Council of Europe–European Union relations
- Canada–European Union relations
- Iceland–European Union relations
- Norway–European Union relations
- Turkey–European Union relations
- Ukraine–European Union relations
- United Kingdom–European Union relations
- Austria–NATO relations
- Cyprus–NATO relations
- Ireland–NATO relations
- Malta–NATO relations
- Ukraine–NATO relations
- Brexit
- Western European Union
- European Union as a potential superpower
- Enlargement of the European Union
- Enlargement of NATO
- European army
- Neutral member states in the European Union
- Strategic autonomy
- Neutral and Non-Aligned European States
