= Veniamin Evsevidis =

Greek Byzantine Catholic bishop

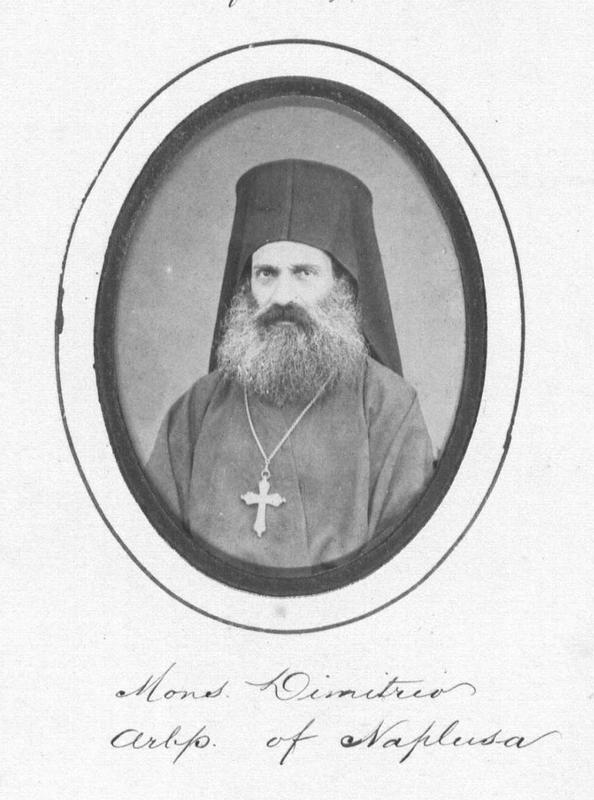
- Church: Eastern Orthodox Church, then Greek Byzantine Catholic Church
- Diocese: Neapolis/Nablus (Eastern Orthodox), Archbishop Emeritus (Catholic)
- Installed: 3 November 1862
- Term ended: 1895 or 1897

Personal details
- Born: Dimitrios Evsevidis; 20 June 1821 Constantinople, Ottoman Empire
- Died: 1895 or 1897 Constantinople, Ottoman Empire
- Buried: Cathedral of the Holy Spirit

Veniamin (Benjamin) Evsevidis (Greek: Βενιαμίν Ευσεβίδης), born as Dimitrios Evsevidis (Δημήτριος Ευσεβίδης; 20 June 1821 – 1895 or 1897) was a bishop of the Greek Byzantine Catholic Church.

== Biography ==
Dimitrios Evsevidis was born in a Greek Orthodox family on 20 June 1821 in Constantinople. He studied at the Great School of the Nation and later at the Halki seminary. On 6 August 1851 he was appointed titular archbishop of Neapolis and auxiliary bishop of the metropolis of Dabar-Bosna, based in Sarajevo, then under the jurisdiction of the Orthodox Church of Constantinople.

His Catholic philosophical tendencies were discovered in a letter intercepted by the Orthodox Ecumenical Patriarchate, and he was charged of apostasy.

In 1858, he was summoned by the patriarchate to Constantinople where, on his own initiative, he was arrested and locked up in the monastery of Rila, in Ottoman Bulgaria. The pontifical apostolic delegation requested help from the French embassy, and Ambassador Édouard Thouvenel became involved in the liberation of the archbishop, obtaining an order for release from the authorities.

Evsevidis was arrested again in 1861 and locked up in Mount Athos, before being released again thanks to the French intervention.

The sources are not particularly clear, but it seems that for a short time he returned to orthodoxy, but on 3 November 1862 he converted again to Catholicism.

Thanks to the priest Joseph Lepavec, in 1863 he traveled to Rome, where he was confirmed at his home. He was appointed auxiliary bishop of the Roman Catholic bishop of Constantinople, exercising his ministry among the Byzantine-rite Catholics of the city. For most of the rest of his life he lived in Karaköy, in the monastery of a Franciscan convent, celebrating the divine daily liturgy at the church of Saint Anthony of Padua. On June 17, 1867 Evsevidis was appointed assistant prelate to the pontifical throne of the Melkite Greek Catholic Church.

He participated in the First Vatican Council In 1882 he ordered to the priesthood Isaias Papadopoulos, the future exarch of the Greek Catholic Apostolic Exarchate of Istanbul.

He died in 1895 or, according to other sources, in 1897 and is buried in the Cathedral of the Holy Spirit of Istanbul.
