= Greeks in Malta =

Ethnic group in the Mediterranean island

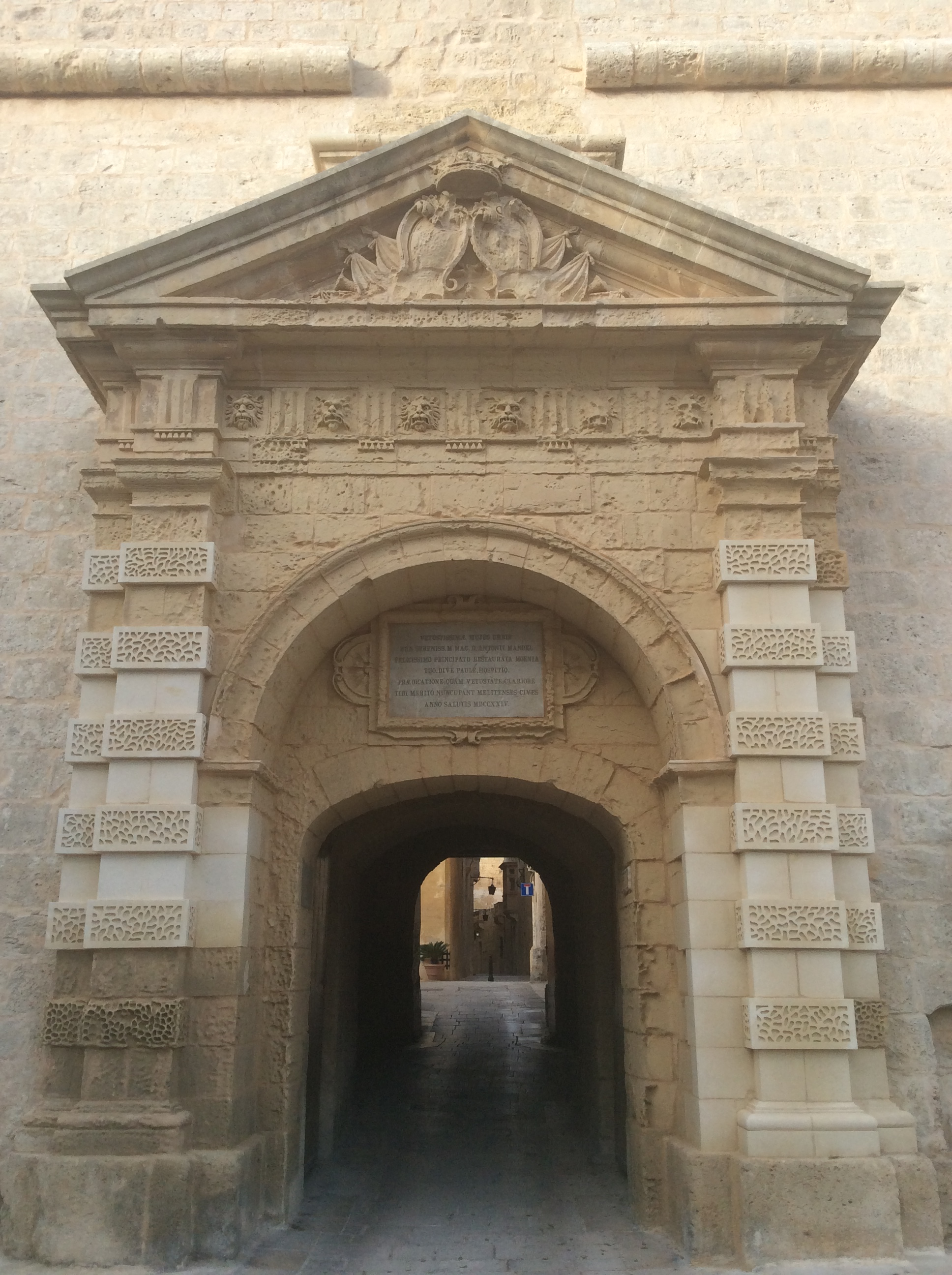
- The Greeks Gate of Mdina

Total population
- ~20 families (2012 estimate)

Regions with significant populations
- Island of Malta (Valletta, Birgu)

Languages
- Maltese, English and Greek

Religion
- Greek Byzantine Catholic Church, Catholic Church, Greek Orthodox Church

Related ethnic groups
- Greek diaspora, Griko people, Maniots, Maltese people

Greeks in Malta (Greek: Έλληνες της Μάλτας, romanized: Ellines tis Maltas; Maltese: Griegi) have a long presence in Malta, which may lead back to ancient history. The archipelago was intensely Hellenized beginning in the 3rd century BC, a process which intertwined with the Christianization of Malta after the 1st century AD. The Byzantine presence was overturned by the Arab conquest of 870, and the surviving Greek community was Islamified. Maltese Christianity of the Byzantine Rite was only preserved in some parts of the country, being especially important in Gozo. These groups formed the basis for a local branch of the Eastern Orthodox Church, revived following Norman conquest in the 1120s. Although marginalized by Catholicism, which became the dominant faith, a Greek-speaking Eastern Orthodox community survived into the 15th century.

Greek immigration was resumed in the 1520s, shortly before the establishment of Hospitaller Malta. It comprised mainly refugees from the Ottoman Empire, hundreds or thousands of whom escaped from Rhodes. They reestablished the Greek Orthodox colony, presumed to have been placed under the Archbishopric of Ohrid, but also included in their ranks Greek-speaking members of both the Latin Church and Greek Byzantine Catholic Church. Within fifty years, with the onset of Counter-Reformation, the former community was pressured into merging with the latter two. By 1600, the Eastern Orthodox Greeks had formally abjured, but in various documented cases continued to practice their older rites. In tandem, the consolidated community of Catholic Greeks discarded its traditional center in Birgu and moved its base to Valletta, after which it became prone to assimilation into the ethnic mainstream.

In the 17th century, the Eastern Orthodox presence was also reinforced by Ottoman Greeks taken as slaves by the Maltese privateers, some of whom were themselves ethnic Greeks; there were also new waves of Maniots and Aetolians. Though small in numbers, the resulting community participated in the propagation of Greek nationalism and of the "Greek Plan". Many local Greeks also supported the French occupation of Malta, which closely preceded a Franco–Ottoman war. During the period of British colonization, the Maltese Greek community leader Ioannis Papafis was a sponsor of the Greek War of Independence. Greeks affiliated with either Catholicism or Eastern Orthodoxy remained present over the following centuries, though the latter community continued to be informally marginalized throughout the 19th century, and are now a small minority.

== Early presence ==
Various archeological finds may suggest some connections between the old Maltese civilization and the Minoan civilization, followed by Mycenaean Greece. In the 1920s, biological anthropologist L. H. Dudley Buxton proposed that the original inhabitants of Malta Island and Gozo were Cretan immigrants. However, the Ancient Greeks appear not to have included either island in their colonization of the Mediterranean, perhaps owing to their lack of natural resources. They used Malta for commerce, but the archipelago was taken over and colonized by Phoenicians, then by Carthage. Gozo is perhaps the mythical island of Ogygia, described in the Odyssey, which may attest that groups of Mycenaeans once settled there. The main island was known in Greece under the name Melite (Μελίτη); one theory is that the name "Malta" is a derivative of the Greek word for "honey" (μέλι). A Phoenician derivation has also been proposed.

Despite being under Carthaginian rule, Malta was culturally integrated by the Hellenistic world in the 3rd century BC, when it built strong commercial links with Magna Graecia. Focusing on the finds at Tas-Silġ, scholar Antonio Tempio proposes that the archipelago was regularly visited by traders from Pithekoūsai, which had a mixed Carthaginian–Greek populace. Greek influence was only reinforced after the First Punic War, when Malta was annexed to the Roman Republic, later becoming part of the Roman Empire alongside Roman Greece. This was especially the case in Gozo, where archeological finds document the extensive circulation of Ancient Greek coinage. While Punic was still spoken locally into the 1st century AD and perhaps even later, it faced competition from both Latin and Greek (see Cippi of Melqart).

The Greek-speaking Byzantine Empire held Malta from the 6th century AD, and, beginning in the 8th century, Maltese Christianity was organized under the Byzantine Rite. Scant archeological evidence may suggest that local communities were under the command of tourmarchoi representing the Sicilian Theme, but this remains disputed. In circa 870, following the islands' capture and annexation by the Emirate of Sicily, some 3,000 men were reportedly killed, while 3,600 women and 5,000 children fell victim the Arab slave trade. The remaining Greek community was persecuted, its bishop enslaved, and its church destroyed. Local Greeks were largely converted to Islam, but continued to speak their original language.

The period of Islamic conversion also witnessed the birth of Maltese, which developed largely from Maghrebi and Siculo-Arabic. Medieval Greek left "remarkably few" or "absolutely no traces" on this linguistic development. There is however evidence that a Christian church, probably Byzantine, still survived on Gozo, though it was cut off from contacts with other parts of Europe. An historical account originating with Zakariya al-Qazwini suggests that in the 11th century the Catepanate of Italy tried to restore Christian Byzantine rule over Malta. This attempt was thwarted when the Arabs agreed to emancipate their slaves, who joined the resistance. Nevertheless, the ethnic origin of these men remains unclear.

== Norman-Byzantine and Rhodian diasporas ==
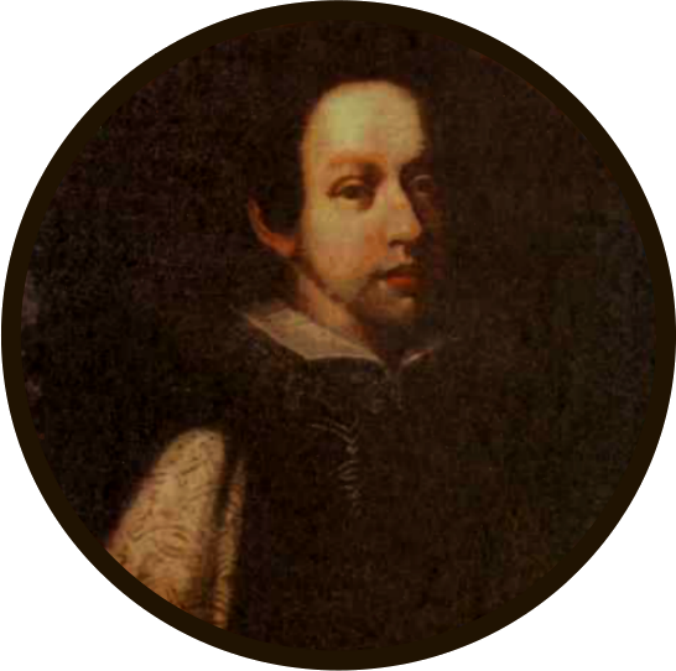
Attributed portrait of Iacob Heraclid (Basilicus Melitensis), displayed at Birgu

Following the Norman conquest of the 1120s, Malta was integrated with the County, then the Kingdom of Sicily, and as such included within the Norman–Byzantine cultural sphere. The new rulers released and sent back to their homes those Christian slaves still present on the islands, but also brought with them a number of Greeks, who were disproportionately represented in the Norman–Sicilian navy. During the brief existence of a Norman kingdom in Africa, Greek administrators participated in repressing Arab piracy. A poem by a Greek exile to Malta, probably authored ca. 1150, laments that the population was still mostly Muslim, and commends the Normans for their efforts to convert them.

Upon the end of that campaign, which can be reliably dated to the 13th century, Maltese Arabs and Greek Muslims were generally converted to Catholicism. There is however evidence that at least some Maltese Greeks opted for the Eastern Orthodox Church (see East–West Schism). Some clandestine sanctuaries might be indicators that Basilian monks, perhaps affiliated with Eastern Orthodoxy, were active in Malta. An obituary discovered in 2012 mentions a Nicólaos Protopapàs Máltes (died 1230). His Greek surname, which can be read as "Protopope", could suggest that Eastern Orthodoxy had maintained an ecclesiastical structure. In the 1260s, Sicily and Malta became part of a personal empire built by Charles I of Anjou. According to anthropologist Stefan Goodwin, at his stage "faltering religious pluralism still existed in the sense that Orthodox Christians, Jews, and Muslims still constituted a substantial minority of the population." Malta's native Greek Orthodoxy probably died out in the mid 15th century.

Other groups of Greeks appeared in that context. In July 1401, the Crown of Aragon (which included Sicily and Malta from 1409) banned the release of Greek, Circassian, Albanian, Ruthenian, Bulgarian and Vlach slaves. From the 16th century on, most Greeks who arrived in Malta did so as a result of displacement by the Ottoman Empire (see Ottoman wars in Europe). Following a siege in 1522, the Knights Hospitaller were chased out Rhodes and granted possession of Malta. Rhodian Greeks followed them there, numbering in the hundreds or as many as 3,000 to 5,000 individuals (up to 20% of the total population). Overall, most migrants were initially Eastern Orthodox—however, Rhodians most likely included parishoners of the Latin Church and Greek Byzantine Catholics.

Eastern Orthodox and Catholic Greeks from Hospitaller Malta and Maltese-occupied Tripoli were granted the privilege of trading with Muslim states, and integrated commercially with the larger Greek diaspora. In tandem, Greek seafarers contributed to the birth of Maltese privateering. Already in the 1530s, the archipelago was home to prosperous Greek Maltese merchants Sydero Metaxí and Stammato Galanti. Eastern Orthodox Rhodians settled in Malta-proper included priest Angelo Metaxí and the prosperous Fundomali family of Birgu. Among the Catholic descendants of this Rhodian diaspora was the adventurer Iacob Heraclid. Born at Birkirkara in 1527, he claimed the thrones of Samos and Chios, and would eventually serve as Prince of Moldavia in the 1560s. Propagated and partly distorted by the Hospitallers, accounts of Heraclid's career have left traces in Maltese literature and historiography.

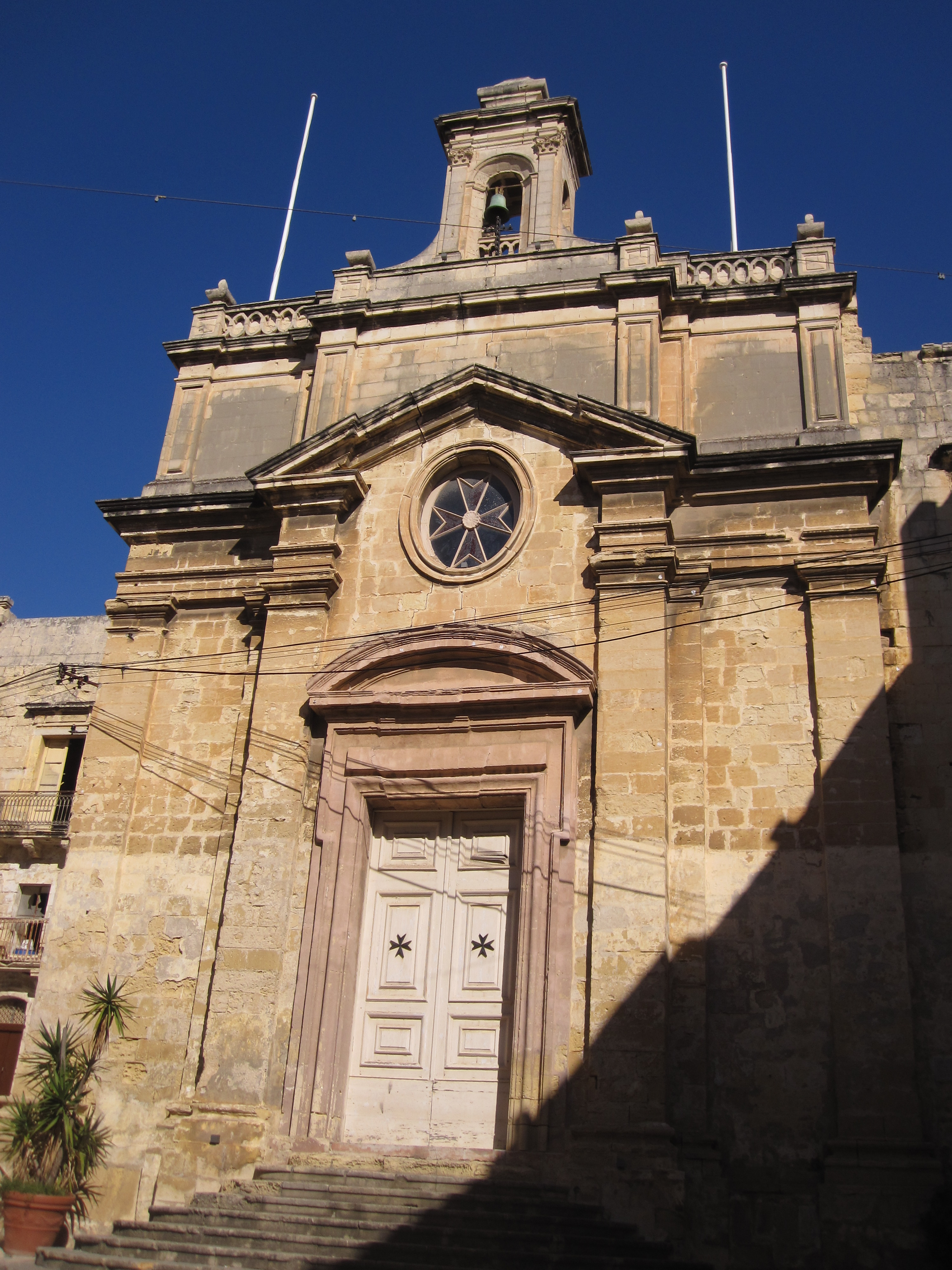
Birgu's former Damascena Church, originally a center of the Byzantine Rite community

With four parish churches mentioned in early records, Birgu remained the center of Greek Rhodian immigration. In 1565, during the Great Siege of Malta, Greeks from that town joined a militia company mainly staffed by Maltese locals. Following the Hospitaller relocation from Birgu to Valletta, Greek converts were invited to the latter city, and were granted the Church of St Nicholas. Despite being a Catholic state, Hospitaller Malta remained somewhat tolerant of the Orthodox presence and, by 1621, the Greek Orthodox community in the archipelago had established direct contacts with the Patriarchate of Constantinople. It is likely that Malta and Gozo answered to the Archbishopric of Ohrid, through a suffragan located at Agrigento.

== Inquisition and assimilation ==
During the Counter-Reformation era, efforts to absorb this congregation into Catholicism became more systematic. Greeks who were still Eastern Orthodox made repeated pledges of union with Catholicism, as a Byzantine Rite Eastern Catholic community, but these remained formal. In the 1570s, Cardinal Giulio Antonio Santoro and the Roman Inquisition made a note that the Greek "heretics" were resisting such attempts, taking their chrism exclusively from their "Oriental prelate". In 1575 Birgu, there were 74 Greek Catholics. Their parish priest, Emmanuel Metaxí, angered Catholic supervisors by omitting references to Filioque and ignoring the Gregorian calendar. Other Byzantine-Rite Greeks were prosecuted for similar offenses involving the calendar, prompting priest Constantin Sguro to ask advice from the Holy See. In one other case, the five daughters of a Greek priest were formally investigated by the Inquisition after accusations that they practiced witchcraft using his leftover chrism. In 1600, Metaxí bequeathed Damascena Church to monks from the Church of Sinai; unusually, this transfer was countersigned by the Catholic Archbishop, Tomás Gargallo. The monks, who also catered to the needs of Greeks in Cospicua, were presumed to be Catholic converts, but later found to be omitting the Filioque.

The presence of Greeks was temporarily reinforced by other factors. By 1580, Hospitaller Malta was organizing privateer raids on Ottoman Tripolitania and the Levant, attracting some Catholic Greek volunteers—perhaps as many as 5% of the total privateers. This trend was still observable in the 1630s, when Greeks made up a sizable portion of the Maltese seafaring community, itself estimated at 20% of the active population. During the Golden Age of Piracy, Malta developed as a slave-trading hub, primarily supplied with Muslim captives. Between 1550 and 1600, some 20% of the captives were Christians, many of them Greeks; the policy was to release most non-Muslims, but in practice some Greeks were still kept as slaves, in perpetuity. In the 17th and 18th centuries, sailors under the Maltese cross were regularly attacking ships manned by sailors from Ottoman Greece, since these were generally Orthodox (and therefore "schismatic"). In various cases, Greek captives began declaring themselves Catholic to obtain release. In 1674, the Holy See gave its permission for the sale of Orthodox slaves, provided they were Ottoman subjects.

Also in the 1670s, some hundreds of Maniots are believed to have settled in the Maltese archipelago. According to Buxton, Maniot "racial" influence was especially striking in and around Żurrieq. Meanwhile, Birgu's Catholic Greek community declined even more, and became small enough to be served by the priests of Borgo. The Catholic Greek parishioners of Valletta are not mentioned in the 1680s census (or Status Animarum) for unclear reasons, but probably had a more thriving community. However, this group became especially prone to assimilation, by adopting the Latin liturgical rites and, with time, Maltese identity. Already before 1670, Maltese graduates of the Pontifical Greek College frequently opted for priesthood into the Latin Church. By 1708, there were only nine Byzantine Rite Catholics of young age registered in Valletta; Latinized Greeks of that age included Gioacchino Loretta, a noted Baroque painter.

According to historian Katerina Papakonstantinou, before 1723 "captains from Messolonghi formed the only Greek presence on the island [of Malta]", by which time "the flag of Malta was often flown by Greek ships, especially those from Messolonghi, in order to provide them easy access to Western European ports." Later in the 18th century, Malta became the destination of sailors from throughout the Aegean Islands. The temporary presence of a Greek colony in southwest Mdina during that age has given its name to the neighboring "Greeks Gate". The lush area outside Rabat is traditionally known as Wied ir-Rum, translated by Giovanni Francesco Abela as Valle de' Christiani Greci ("Valley of the Greek Christians"; see Rûm).

== Napoleonic era ==
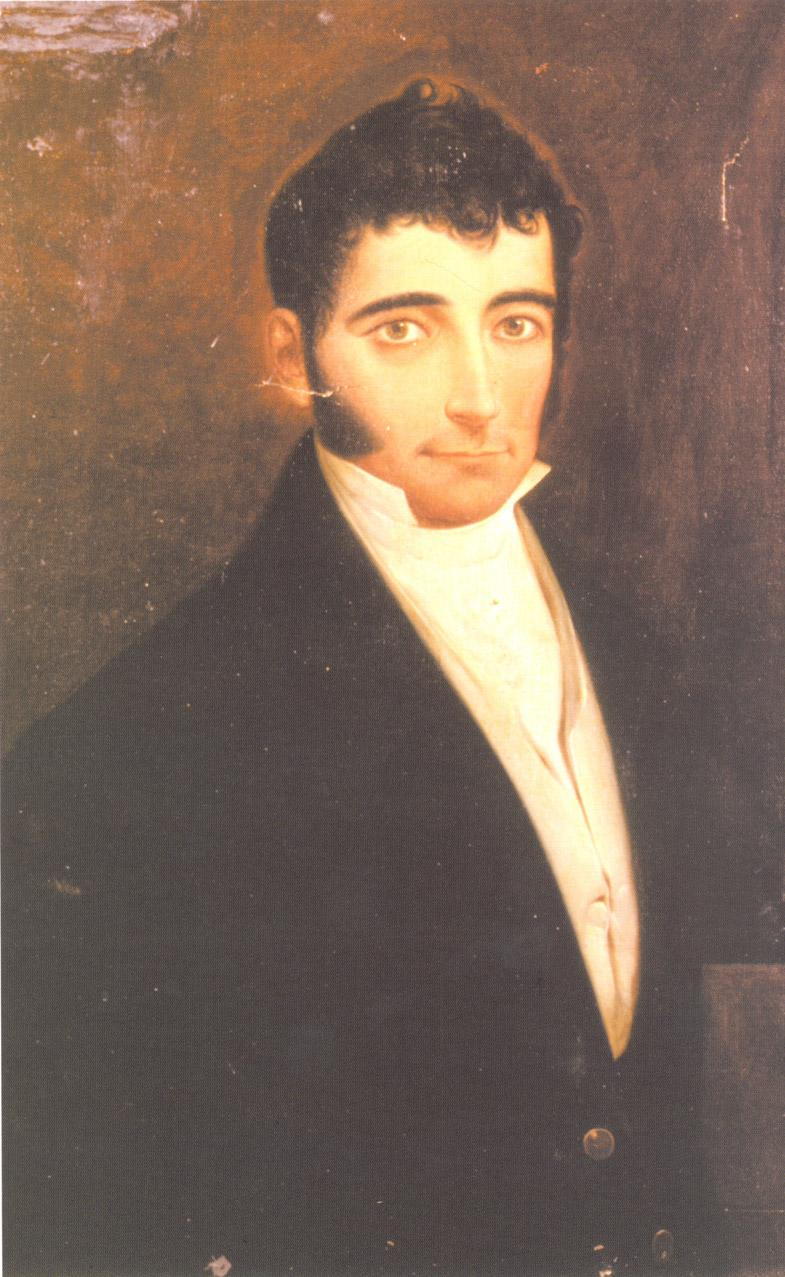
Portrait of Ioannis Papafis

Beginning in the 1760s, Hospitaller Malta became interesting to the Russian Empire, which increased its presence in the Mediterranean and even attempted to impose its rule. A Greek-Russian envoy, Antonio Psaro, negotiated an understanding between the Order and the Russians, integrating Malta with the "Greek Plan" before 1789. Such maneuvers enhanced the rift between the Hospitallers and the French Republic. In June 1798, a French occupation of Malta ended Hospitaller rule. Maltese Greeks were reportedly enthusiastic about this development, believing it a prelude to the liberation of Greece.

On Napoleon's orders, the 2,000 slaves still present in Malta were all manumitted. In his proclamations, he thanked the Greeks for their loyalty, and banned Latin priests from ever officiating in "Greek Churches". However, an explicit order was given to execute Greeks who maintained relations with the Russian Empire. While the French engaged the Ottomans in battle, an attempt to revive the Hospitallers as an Orthodox-and-Catholic order was made by Paul I of Russia (see Russian tradition of the Knights Hospitaller). Participating in this reconciliation, Jean-Baptiste Antoine de Flachslanden proposed to create a Hospitallers' Langue for Greek expatriates. However, his project also called for moving the Order's headquarters to Austrian Dalmatia.

500 Greeks and some "disloyal Maltese" still assisted the beleaguered French Revolutionary Army during the uprising of September 1798. There followed an occupation by the United Kingdom of Great Britain and Ireland, which imposed a Malta Protectorate (nominally under the Kingdom of Naples). During this time, Ottoman Greeks were among the soldiers of fortune taken to serve at Fort Ricasoli; they were then participants in the Froberg mutiny of April 1807. The revolt was violently suppressed, but not before attempts at mediation involving local Greek priests.

With the establishment of the Crown Colony of Malta within the British Empire, Eastern Orthodox Greeks again had a noted presence in the islands. In 1816, they founded Saint George Church of Valletta, re-purposing a regular 17th-century building. The Church Mission Society noted that, between 1810 and 1819, the number of Greek Orthodox "foreigners" in Malta had declined from 12,000 (the largest minority, ahead of 7,000 Jews), to a "very small number". The Catholic parishioners who identified as Greeks were a similarly minor presence. In 1806, only 76 individuals registered with Byzantine Catholic churches anywhere in the archipelago.

With the end of the Napoleonic Wars came a regeneration of the Black Sea wheat trade, and Greek-run enterprises became its major players, setting up representations in Maltese ports. Greek community life experienced a small revival during the Greek War of Independence, when events such as the Chios massacre pushed some, including the shipowner and political conspirator Alexandros Kontostavlos, to seek refuge on the Maltese islands. The newly proclaimed Hellenic Republic managed to set up a consulate in Malta, but it remained largely inactive. In that context, one particularly important Greek migrant was the broker Ioannis Papafis, originally from Thessaloniki, who had moved to Malta in 1818. Until his death in 1886, Papafis contributed significantly to the local society; he also provided financial aid for the Hellenic Republic, and later for the Kingdom of Greece.

== Modern communities ==
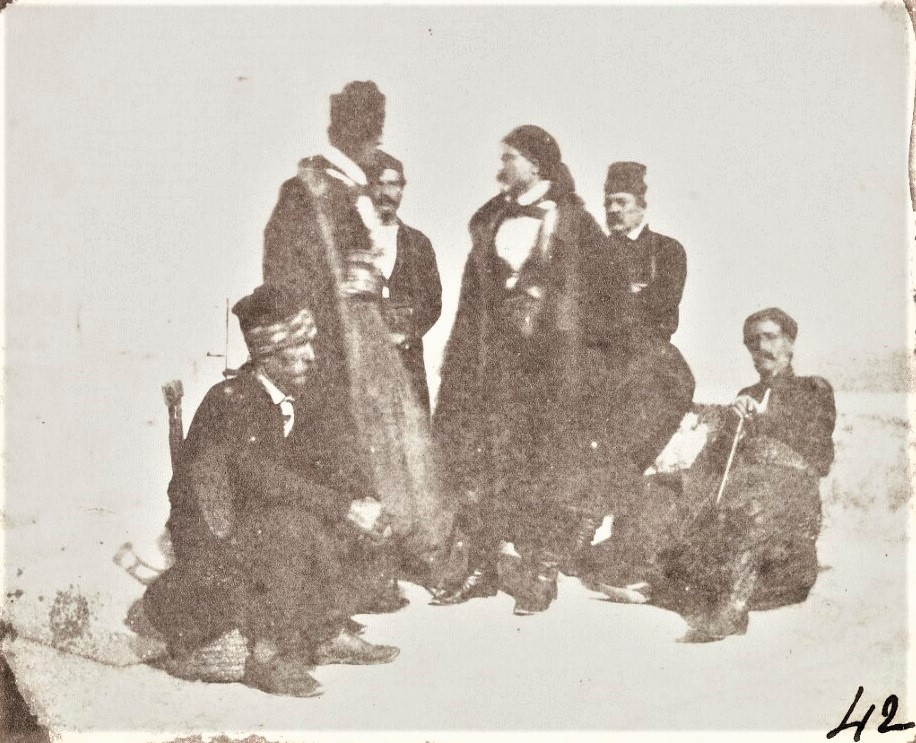
Greeks in Malta in 1846; calotype by Calvert Jones

British rule introduced toleration for Greek Orthodox customs, but Catholicism was preserved as the privileged religion. A controversy erupted in the 1840s, when Greek Orthodox priests began wearing their vestments outside church, testing an older customary prohibition. Greece intervened to protect that right, but the First Russell ministry sided with Maltese Catholics. The Catholic Greeks, meanwhile, no longer ordained local priests, relying on envoys from the Italo-Albanian Catholic Church. Their two churches in Valletta, St Nicholas and the new Damascene Church, had by then been reassigned to Latin confraternities. Some Greeks joined other spiritual communities: in 1831, American Congregationalist records noted the existence in Malta of at least one family of Greek affiliates, one of whom helped direct the effort to establish missions in Greece.

By the 1880s, Greeks from the islands had joined in the Maltese migration to the Khedivate of Egypt. British reports of the period claim that Greek Maltese settlers in Alexandria were often engaged in criminal activities. When the ‘Urabi revolt reached the city in June 1882, Maltese Greeks were among its earliest victims (see Bombardment of Alexandria). There were various instances of Greek migration to Malta, including, in the 1880s, the Orthodox Giovanni Dacoutros of Santorini. He founded a successful business which relied on imported Greek wine, while other families of immigrants (Colombos, Grech, Marich, Sorottos, etc.) dealt mainly in tobacco. The British census of 1911 recorded 36 males and 39 female Greek nationals among the recent immigrants to the Colony.

In 1915, scholar Raymond Janin still noted the existence of "small colony" of Byzantine-Rite Catholic Greeks in Malta. He counted this group alongside similar communities of Grikos and Arbëreshë in the Italian Peninsula, Cargèse, and French North Africa, estimating the total number at 25,000. The Damascene church was returned to them in 1934, but was then heavily damaged during the bombing raids on Malta. Greek Orthodox still maintained a chapel in the 1950s, but it reportedly had no attending priest. According to the Catholic cleric Giorgio Schirò, this issue prompted many more Orthodox to join his Byzantine-Rite community.

The present-day non-assimilated Greek presence in Malta remains small. An informal estimate for 2012 placed the total number of Greeks in Malta at 20 families or less. The Orthodox community, comprising some 50 people in 2010, was allocated to the Greek Orthodox Archdiocese of Italy and Malta until January 2021, when a Maltese Excharcate was created. Catholic Byzantine-Rite Greeks are mainly parishioners of the Damascene Church. In 2012, this was served by a non-Greek priest, George Mifsud Montanaro, and affiliated with the Melkite Greek Catholic Church (Diocese of Galilee). In July 2015, members of the communities and temporary migrants from Greece protested alongside Moviment Graffitti in Valletta, showing support for the anti-austerity movement in Greece.

== See also ==
- Greece–Malta relations
- Greek diaspora
- Immigration to Malta
