= Chapel of Our Lady of Damascus, Birgu =

Chapel of Our Lady of Damascus
- Tal-Griegi
- Kappella tal-Madonna ta' Damasku
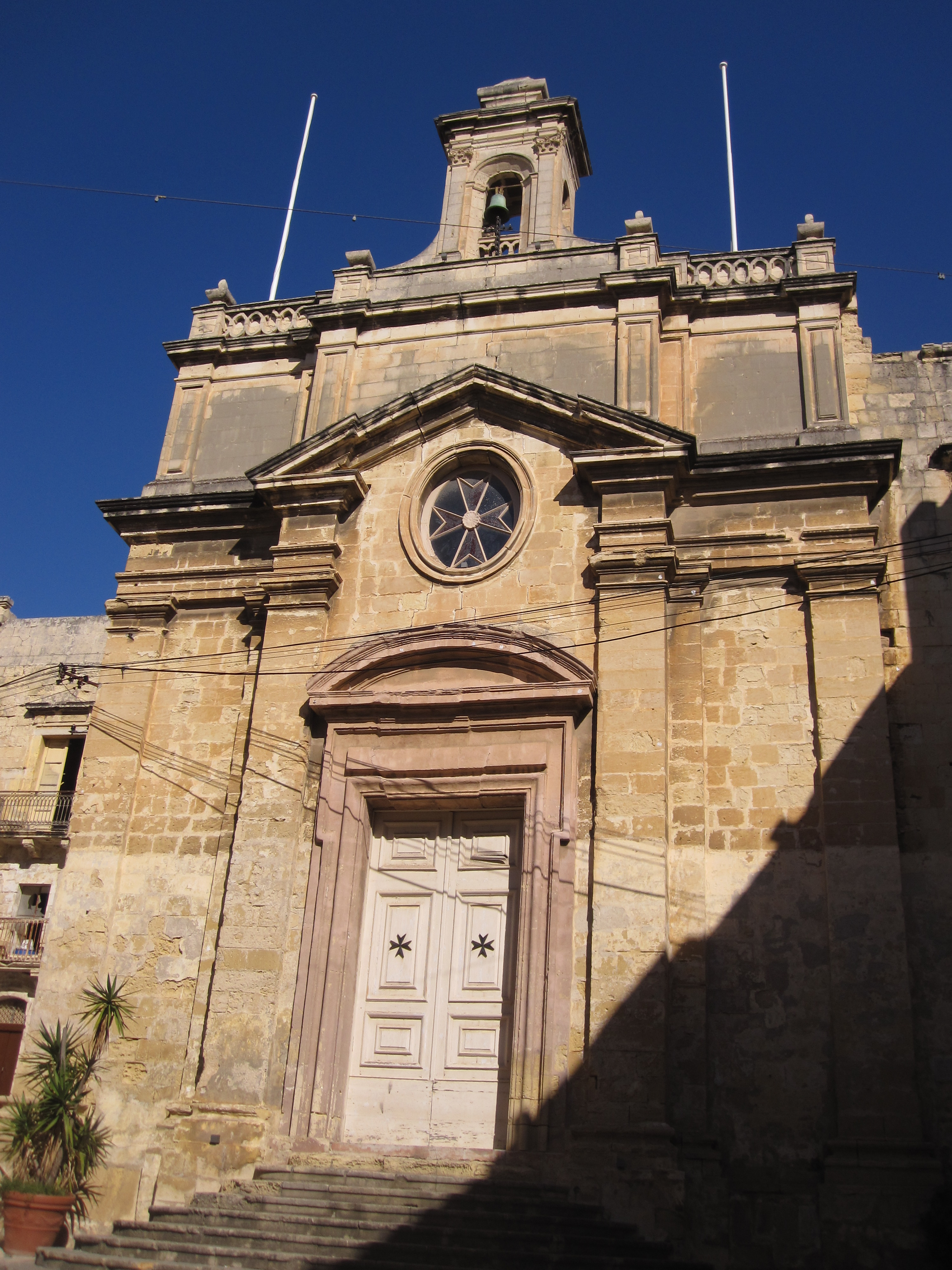

- Location within Malta
- 35°53′15.6″N 14°31′18.5″E
- Location: Birgu
- Country: Malta
- Denomination: Roman Catholic
- Previous denomination: Greek Catholic

History
- Dedication: Our Lady of Damascus

Architecture
- Style: Baroque

The Chapel of Our Lady of Damascus also known in Maltese as Tal-Griegi is a former Greek Catholic church located in the town of Birgu, Malta. Nowadays it is part of the Oratory of St Joseph.

== History ==
Originally the chapel was used for Roman Catholic services and was dedicated to St Catherine of Alexandria. The arrival of Greek refugess from the island of Rhodes in 1522 brought a need for new places of worship. The Greeks came with the Knights upon expulsion from Rhodes. They settled in Birgu. With agreement from the Bishop of Malta, the chapel of St Catherine, together with the chapels of St George and the Visitation, respectively, were given to the Greeks for their own use of divine services according to the Byzantine tradition. The name of the chapel was changed in 1575 when inquisitor Pietro Dusina officially established the chapel of St Catherine as one of the parish churches of the Greek population of Birgu. The name comes from the icon of Our Lady of Damascus which was brought from Rhodes and put in the chapel as the titular instead that of St Catherine. Nowadays the original icon is found in the Greek Catholic church of Our Lady of Damascus in Valletta where it was moved in 1587.

The chapel continued to be used by the Greek population until 1780. On February 24, 1832, the chapel was bought by the fraternity of St Joseph who adjoined the chapel to their own adjacent oratory church dedicated to St Joseph. However, the chapel was conserved in its original state, with the original altar. Another Greek icon of Our Lady replaced the original icon which was transferred to Valletta. It too became known as "Our Lady of Damascus" like its predecessor. Restoration and studies conducted on the icon discovered it to be in fact much older than originally thought. The icon, measuring 101.8 × 70.9 cm, was painted between the end of the 13th century and the start of the 15th century, making it an original and not a replica. The icon is now known as "Our Lady of the Sweet Embrace".

Nowadays the chapel is no longer used for religious services but is part of the parish museum.
