= George Calavassy =

- Apostolic Exarch of Greece
- Native name: Γεώργιος Χαλαβαζής
- Church: Greek Byzantine Catholic Church
- See: Apostolic Exarchate of Greece
- In office: 11 June 1932 – 7 November 1957
- Predecessor: Exarchate erected
- Successor: Hyakinthos Gad
- Other post: Titular Bishop of Theodoropolis (1920-1957)
- Previous post: Apostolic Exarch of Istanbul (1920-1932)

Orders
- Ordination: 29 June 1906
- Consecration: 15 August 1920 by Isaias Papadopoulos

Personal details
- Born: 2 February 1881 Syros, Aegean Islands, Kingdom of Greece
- Died: 7 November 1957 (aged 76)

George Calavassy (Greek: Γεώργιος Χαλαβαζής; 2 February 1881 in Greece – 7 November 1957 in Greece) was a Catholic prelate belonging to Apostolic Exarchate of Constantinople from 13 July 1920 to 11 June 1932, and Exarch of the Greek Byzantine Catholic Church from 11 June 1932 to 7 November 1957.

== Biography ==
After receiving theological education was ordained priest on 29 June 1906. On 13 July 1920 Pope Benedict XV appointed George Calavassy Exarch to Constantinople and titular bishop of Theodoropolis. On 15 August 1920 he was ordained bishop by Isaias Papadopoulos and Denis Leonid Varouhas. On 11 June 1932 Pope Pius XI made him the Apostolic Exarch to the Greek Catholic Church in Greece.

== See also ==
- Catholic Church in Greece
