= Holy Trinity Cathedral, Athens =

Holy Trinity Cathedral
- Καθεδρικός και Ενοριακός Ιερός Ελληνόρρυθμος Καθολικός Ναός Αγίας Τριάδος
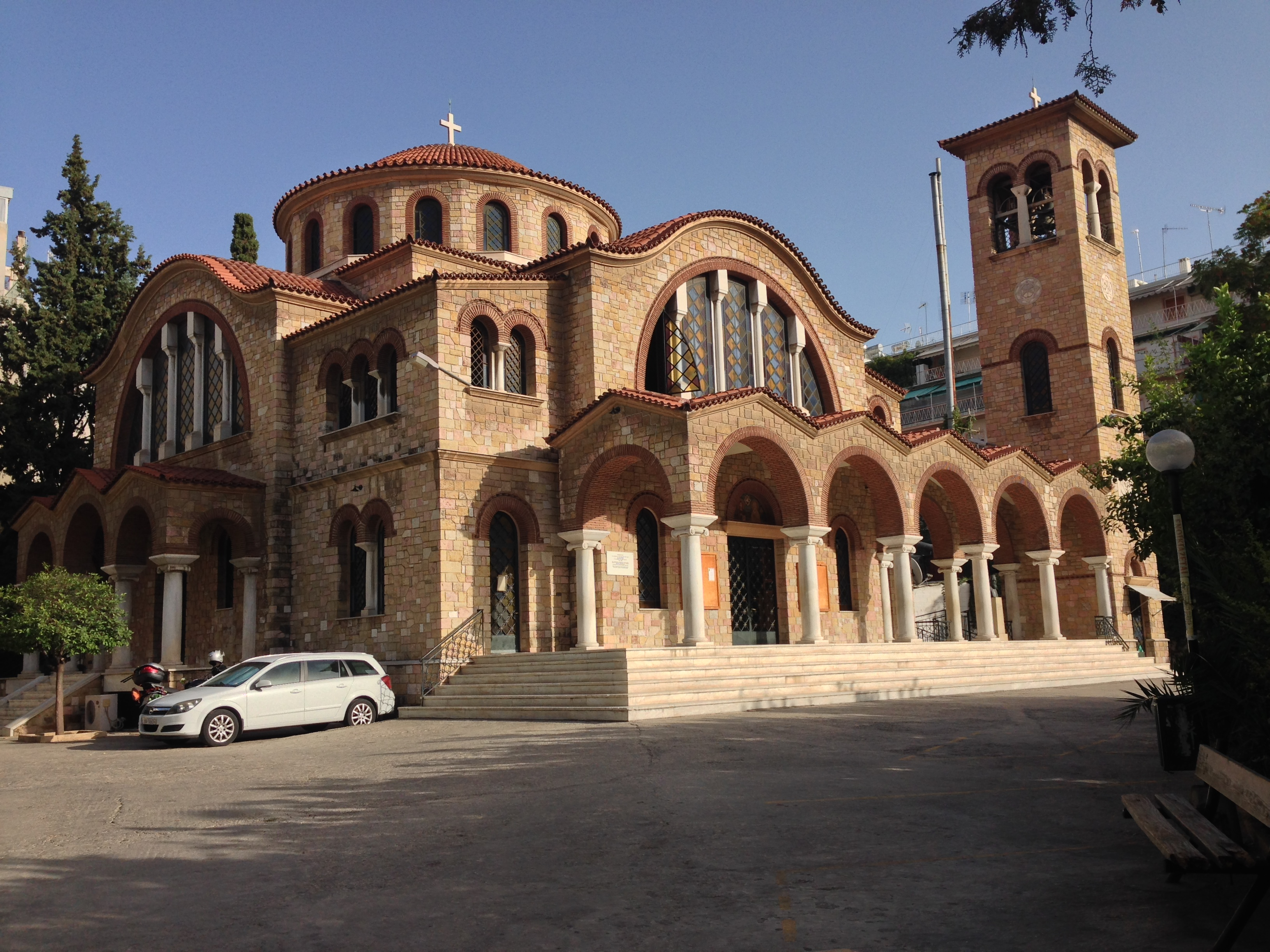
- Holy Trinity Cathedral
- 38.0051°N 23.7294°E
- Location: Athens
- Country: Greece
- Denomination: Catholic
- Tradition: Greek Byzantine
- Website: www.gcatholic.org/churches/europe/5699.htm

History
- Status: Active
- Dedication: Trinity

Architecture
- Completed: June 11, 1932

The Holy Trinity Cathedral (Greek: Καθεδρικός και Ενοριακός Ιερός Ελληνόρρυθμος Καθολικός Ναός Αγίας Τριάδος) also called Greek-Catholic Cathedral of Athens is a Greek Byzantine Catholic cathedral in Athens, Greece.

It functions as the seat of the Greek Catholic Apostolic Exarchate of Greece (Exarchatus Apostolicus Graeciae) that was created on June 11, 1932, by the then Pope, Pius XI, and follows the Byzantine Rite.

It was most recently under the pastoral responsibility of Bishop Manuel Nin.

== See also ==
- Greek Byzantine Catholic Church
- Roman Catholicism in Greece
- Holy Trinity
