= Holy Trinity Greek Catholic Cathedral, Istanbul =

Coordinates: 41.034889°N 28.9761204°E

Holy Trinity Greek Catholic Cathedral
- Ayatriada Rum Katolik Kilisesi
- Holy Trinity Greek Catholic Cathedral
- Location: Istanbul
- Country: Turkey
- Denomination: Catholic Church (Greek Byzantine Catholic Church)

Holy Trinity Greek Catholic Cathedral in Istanbul (Turkish: Ayatriada Rum Katoliki Kilise), also called Holy Trinity Rum Catholic Church, is the cathedral of the Greek Byzantine Catholic Church in Istanbul, Turkey. It is located on Hamalbaşı Caddesi in the Beyoğlu district of Istanbul and is currently used as a church for the local Chaldean Catholic community.

The Greek Byzantine Catholic Church is an Eastern Catholic Church of the Byzantine rite in full communion with the Pope in Rome. The cathedral is one of 3 Catholic cathedrals in the city, the others being St. Mary of Sakızağaç Cathedral of the Armenian rite and the Cathedral of the Holy Spirit of the Latin rite.

It is the main church of the Greek Apostolic Exarchate of Istanbul (Exarchatus Apostolicus Constantinopolitanus) which was created in 1911 with parts of the territory of the Ottoman Empire and since 2016 has been administered by an apostolic administrator. According to the 2017 Annuario Pontificio, it was the sole parish of the exarchate and has 16 parishioners. The cathedral facilities are being used by Chaldean Catholic refugees from the Eparchy of Diyarbekir.

== See also ==
- Catholicism in Turkey
- Cathedral of the Holy Spirit
