= Dimitri Salachas =

Greek Eastern Catholic bishop (1939–2023)

- Apostolic Exarch of Greece
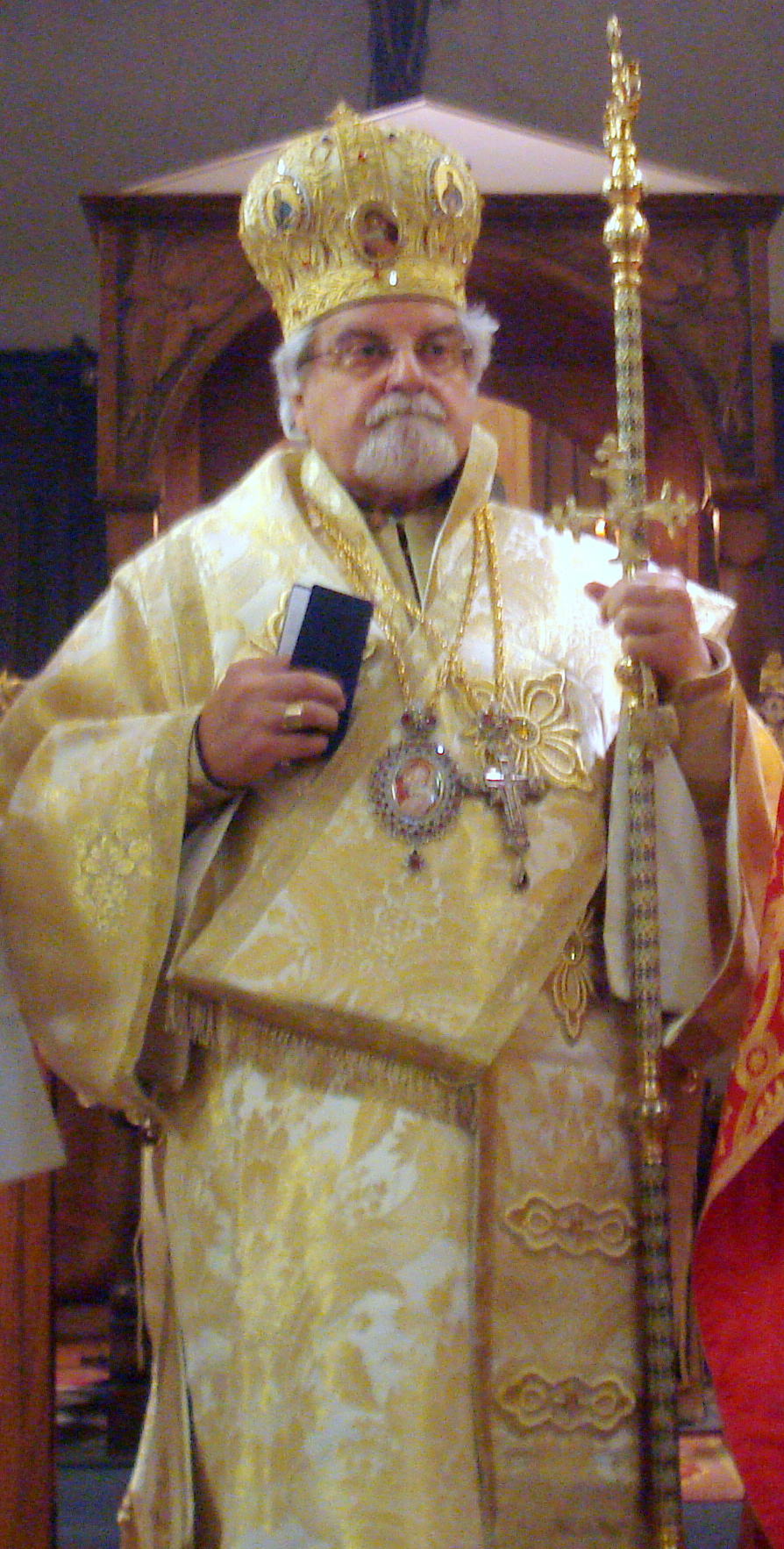
- Church: Greek Byzantine Catholic Church
- Appointed: 23 April 2008
- Term ended: 2 February 2016
- Predecessor: Anargyros Printezis
- Successor: Manuel Nin, O.S.B.

Orders
- Ordination: 9 February 1964 (Priest)
- Consecration: 24 May 2008 (Bishop) by Mihai Frățilă

Personal details
- Born: 7 June 1939 Athens, Greece
- Died: 16 October 2023 (aged 84) Athens, Greece

Dimitrios (Dimitri) Salachas (7 June 1939 – 16 October 2023) was the apostolic exarch of the Greek Byzantine Catholic Church.

== Biography ==
Dimitrios Salachas was born in Athens on 7 June 1939, and was ordained priest on 9 February 1964.

Salachas was a well-known Greek scholar in Canon Law. He did his doctoral research in Byzantine ecclesiastical laws and civil laws. He taught canon law (both Latin and Oriental) in Pontifical Urbaniana University, Pontifical Gregorian University, Pontifical University of Saint Thomas Aquinas, Angelicum and Pontifical Oriental Institute in Rome.

Salachas was consultor of the Congregation for the Oriental Churches and of the Pontifical Councils for the Interpretation of the Legislative Texts and for the Promotion of the Unity of Christians. As an expert in comparative Ecclesiastical Laws, Bishop Salachas was a member of the Episcopal Conference of Greece. He was a member of the Joint International Commission for Theological Dialogue Between the Catholic Church and the Orthodox Church. He was a member of the International Society of Oriental Canon Law.

On 23 April 2008, he was appointed Apostolic Exarch of the Greek Catholic Apostolic Exarchate of Greece and titular bishop. He was ordained bishop on 24 May 2008. In 2008 he was appointed titular bishop of Carcabia, and on 14 May 2012 he was promoted to the titular see of Gratianopolis. Pope Francis accepted his resignation on 2 February 2016.

Salachas died on 16 October 2023, at the age of 84.

== Works ==
- Bishop Salachas was a contributor to the Italian commentary on CCEO Commento al Codice dei Canoni delle Chiese Orientali (2001), the English edition of which is A Guide to the Eastern Code: A Commentary on the Code of Canons of the Eastern Churches (Pontificio istituto orientale, 2002)
- His other major works are:
- L'iniziazione cristiana nei Codici orientale e latino (1992);
- Istituzioni di diritto canonico delle Chiese cattoliche orientali (1993);
- Il sacramento del matrimonio nel Nuovo Diritto canonico delle Chiese orientali(1994);
- Il Diritto canonico delle Chiese orientali nel primo millenio (1997);
- Teologia e disciplina dei sacramenti nei codici latino e orientale (1999)
- La vita consacrata nel Codice dei canoni delle Chiese orientali (CCEO) (2006);
- Chierici e ministero sacro nel codice latino e orientale : prospettive interecclesiali (2004);
- Questioni interecclesiali nel diritto matrimoniale canonico (2003);
- Dialogo interreligioso e inculturazione del Vangelo nell'azione missionaria della Chiesa (2003);
- Codificazione latina e orientale e canoni preliminary (2003);
- Il magistero e l'evangelizzazione dei popoli nei Codici latino e orientale : studio teologico-giuridico comparativo (2001);
- Costituzioni dei Santi Apostoli : per mano di Clemente (2001);
- Ta mysteria tes christianikes myeseos (Baptisma, Christma, Theia Eucharistia) : sto neo kodika kanonikou dikaiou tes Romaiokatholikes Ekklesias (Codex Iuris Canonici) (1989);
- Il dialogo teologico ufficiale tra la chiesa cattolico-romana e la chiesa ortodossa : iter e documentazione (1994);
- Il dialogo teologico ufficiale tra la chiesa cattolico-romana e la chiesa ortodossa : la quarta assemblea plenaria di Bari, 1986-1987 (1988).

== See also ==
- Greek Byzantine Catholic Church
- CCEO
