= Anargyros Printezis =

- Apostolic Exarch of Greece
- Native name: Ανάργυρος Πρίντεζης
- Church: Greek Byzantine Catholic Church
- See: Apostolic Exarchate of Greece
- In office: 28 June 1975 – 23 April 2008
- Predecessor: Hyakinthos Gad
- Successor: Dimitri Salachas
- Other post: Titular Eparch of Gratianopolis (1975-2012)

Orders
- Ordination: 10 December 1961
- Consecration: 6 August 1975 by Saba Youakim

Personal details
- Born: 9 September 1937 Vari, Syros, Aegean Islands, Kingdom of Greece
- Died: 18 March 2012 (aged 74)

Anargyros Printezis (Greek: Ανάργυρος Πρίντεζης; 9 September 1937 – 18 March 2012) was the titular bishop of Gratianopolis and Apostolic Exarch of the Byzantine Rite Catholics in Greece.

Anargyros Printezis was born in Vari, Syros island, Greece in August 1937, and was ordained a priest on 10 December 1961. He was appointed titular bishop of Gratianopolis and Apostolic Exarch of the Byzantine Rite Catholics in Greece on 28 June 1975 and ordained bishop on 6 August 1975.

Anargyros retired from Apostolic Exarchate of the Byzantine Rite Catholics in Greece on 23 April 2008.

== Sources ==
- http://www.catholic-hierarchy.org/bishop/bprina.html
- http://www.gcatholic.org/dioceses/diocese/gree3.htm
- https://web.archive.org/web/20110710175103/http://elcathex.com/eke/index.php?option=content&task=view&id=172&Itemid=
- https://web.archive.org/web/20080630053909/http://www.elcathex.com/eke/index.php?option=content&task=view&id=1037&Itemid=
- https://web.archive.org/web/20110727224855/http://www.rumkatkilise.org/community_news_page.htm
