= Greek Catholic Apostolic Exarchate of Greece =

Eastern Catholic ecclesiastical jurisdiction in Greece

Apostolic Exarchate of Greece
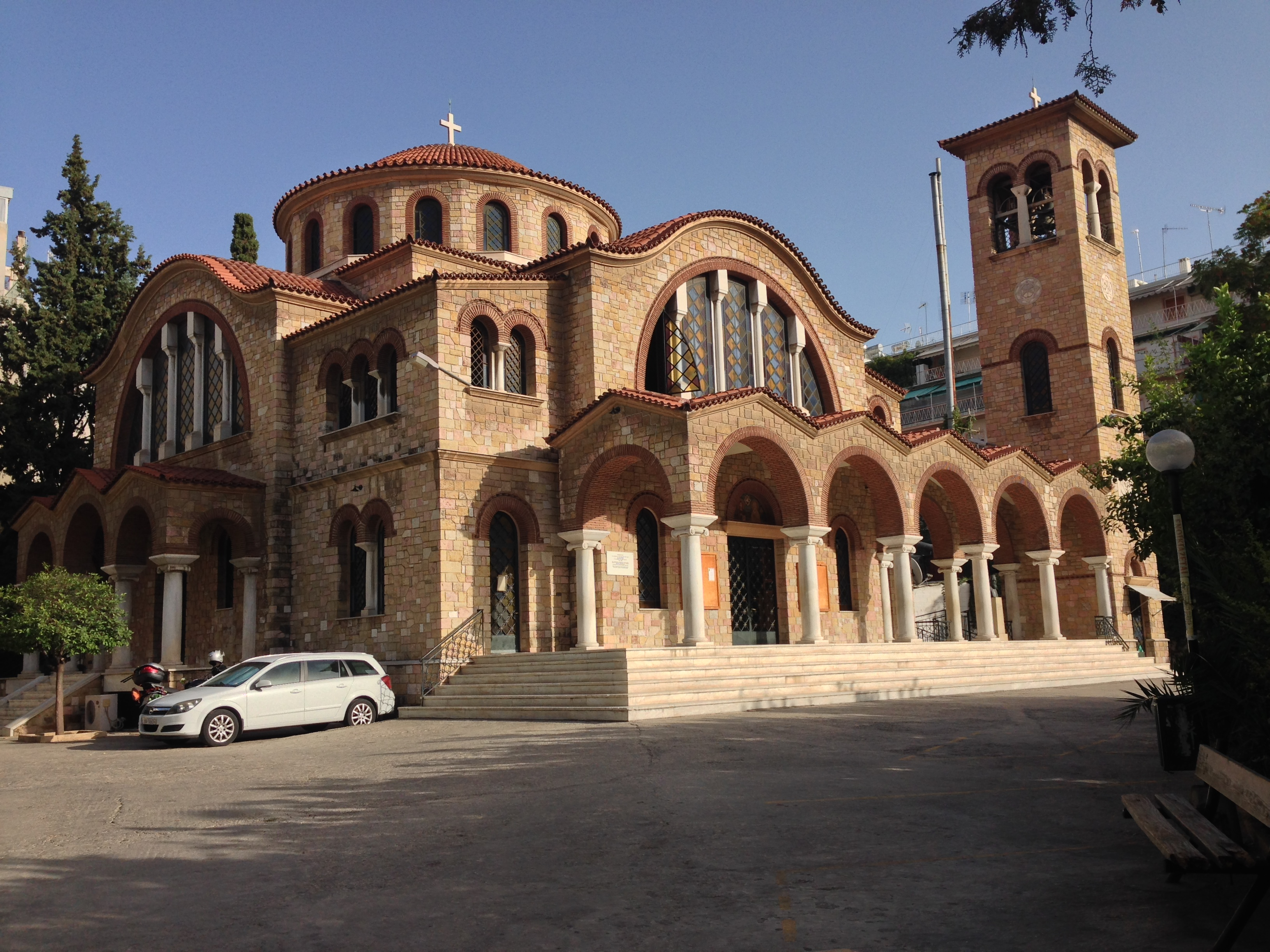
- Holy Trinity Cathedral, Athens

Location
- Country: Greece
- Metropolitan: Exempt directly to the Holy See

Information
- Denomination: Catholic Church
- Sui iuris church: Greek Byzantine Catholic Church
- Rite: Byzantine Rite
- Established: 11 June 1932
- Cathedral: Holy Trinity Cathedral in Athens

Current leadership
- Pope: Leo XIV
- Bishop: Sede vacante
- Vicar General: Peter Fučo

The Apostolic Exarchate of Greece is a Greek Byzantine Catholic Church ecclesiastical territory or apostolic exarchate of the Catholic Church in Greece. As there are no metropolitan sees in the Greek Byzantine Church, it is exempt directly to the Holy See and the Congregation for the Oriental Churches.

The cathedra is in the Holy Trinity Cathedral in the episcopal see of Athens, with a titular bishop responsible for the entire Greek Byzantine Catholic community in Greece.

== History ==
It was established on 11 June 1932 as the Apostolic Exarchate of Greece, from territory split off from the then Apostolic Exarchate of Turkey of Europe (meaning European Turkey), now the Apostolic Exarchate of Istanbul. The Greek Byzantine Catholic bishop of European Turkey, George Cavassy, became the new bishop of the Greek Catholic Exarchate of Greece.

== Ordinaries ==
Apostolic Exarchs of Greece

- George Calavassy (1932.06.11 – death 1957.11.07), Titular Bishop of Theodoropolis (1920.07.13 – 1957.11.07); previously Apostolic Exarch of Turkey of Europe of the Greeks (European Turkey) (1920.07.13 – 1932.06.11)
- Hyakinthos Gad (1958.02.17 – death 1975.01.30), Titular Bishop of Gratianopolis (in Mauretania) (1958.02.17 – 1975.01.30)
- Anárghyros Printesis (1975.06.28 – retired 2008.04.23), Titular Bishop of Gratianopolis (1975.06.28 – death 2012.03.18)
- Dimitrios Salachas (2008.04.23 – 2016.02.02), Titular Bishop of Gratianopolis (2012.05.14 – ...), Member of Commission for the Study of the Reform of the Matrimonial Processes in Canon Law (2014.08.27 – 2015); previously Titular Bishop of Carcabia (2008.04.23 – 2012.05.14)
- Manuel Nin (2016.02.02 – 2026.01.31), Titular Bishop of Carcabia (2016.02.02 – ...)

== Source and External links ==
- Website of the Greek Catholic Apostolic Exarchate of Greece
- GCatholic with incumbent biography links
