= Theodoropolis in Europa =

See Theodoropolis for namesakes

Theodoropolis in Europa (Greek: Θεοδωρoύπολις) is an ancient city and former bishopric, remaining a Latin Catholic titular see, also succeeded by a Greek Catholic titular bishopric under the name Theodorium.

Its presumed location is Badoma, in modern European Turkey.

== History ==
Theodoropolis was important enough in the late Roman province of Europa to become a suffragan of its capital (Heraclea in Europa, ?later Perinthus)'s Metropolitan Archbishop, yet would fade.

== Titular successor see ==
In 1925, the diocese was nominally restored as a Roman Catholic titular bishop as the latin, Theodorium, when George Calavassy was made Greek Catholic Apostolic Exarch of Constantinople and titular bishop of Theodorium. When he was made Greek Catholic Apostolic Exarch of Greece in 1933, he remained the titular bishop of Theodorium, until his death in 1957.
