= Theodoropolis =

Theodoropolis (Θεοδωρόπολις) and Theodoroupolis (Θεοδωρούπολις) are the names of a number of ancient cities/towns and forts ('-polis' being Greek for city/town) either named after a saint or a Roman Emperor (Theodoros, Theodore or Theodora), notably :

- Theodoropolis in Arcadia, in Egypt, also a diocese.
- Theodoropolis in Europa, in the Roman province of Europa (now European Turkey), also a former diocese, and Catholic titular see.
- Euchaneia, a center of the veneration of Saint Theodore of Amasea a town near or identical with Euchaita in the Roman province or Pontus in Asia Minor).
- Former Dorostolon, renamed after Byzantine empress Theodora, wife of John I Tzimisces
