= Hyakinthos Gad =

- Apostolic Exarch of Greece
- Church: Greek Byzantine Catholic Church
- See: Apostolic Exarchate of Greece
- In office: 17 February 1958 – 1975
- Predecessor: George Calavassy
- Successor: Anargyros Printezis
- Other post: Titular Eparch of Gratianopolis (1958-1975)

Orders
- Ordination: 1 December 1935
- Consecration: 12 March 1958 by Maximos V Hakim

Personal details
- Born: 2 February 1912 Syros, Aegean Islands, Kingdom of Greece
- Died: 30 January 1975 (aged 62)

Hyakinthos Gad (2 February 1912 – 30 January 1975) was Apostolic exarch of the Greek Byzantine Catholic Church from 17 February 1958 to 1975.

== Biography ==
Gad was born on 2 February 1912 in Greece. After receiving theological education, he was ordained on December 1, 1935, as a Catholic priest of the Byzantine Rite. On 17 February 1958, Pope Pius XII appointed him exarch and titular Bishop of Gratianopolis. On 12 March 1958, Gad was ordained bishop by the patriarch of the Melkite Greek Catholic Church Maximos V Hakim, who co-celebrated with the Roman Catholic Archbishop of Athens Marios Makrionitis and Roman Catholic Bishop of Syros and Milos Georgios Xenopoulos. From 1961 to 1964, Hyakinthos Gad participated in the I, II, III and IV the sessions of the Second Vatican Council. In early 1975, Exarch Gad retired and died soon after, on 30 January 1975.
