= Greece–Malta relations =

- Greece: Malta

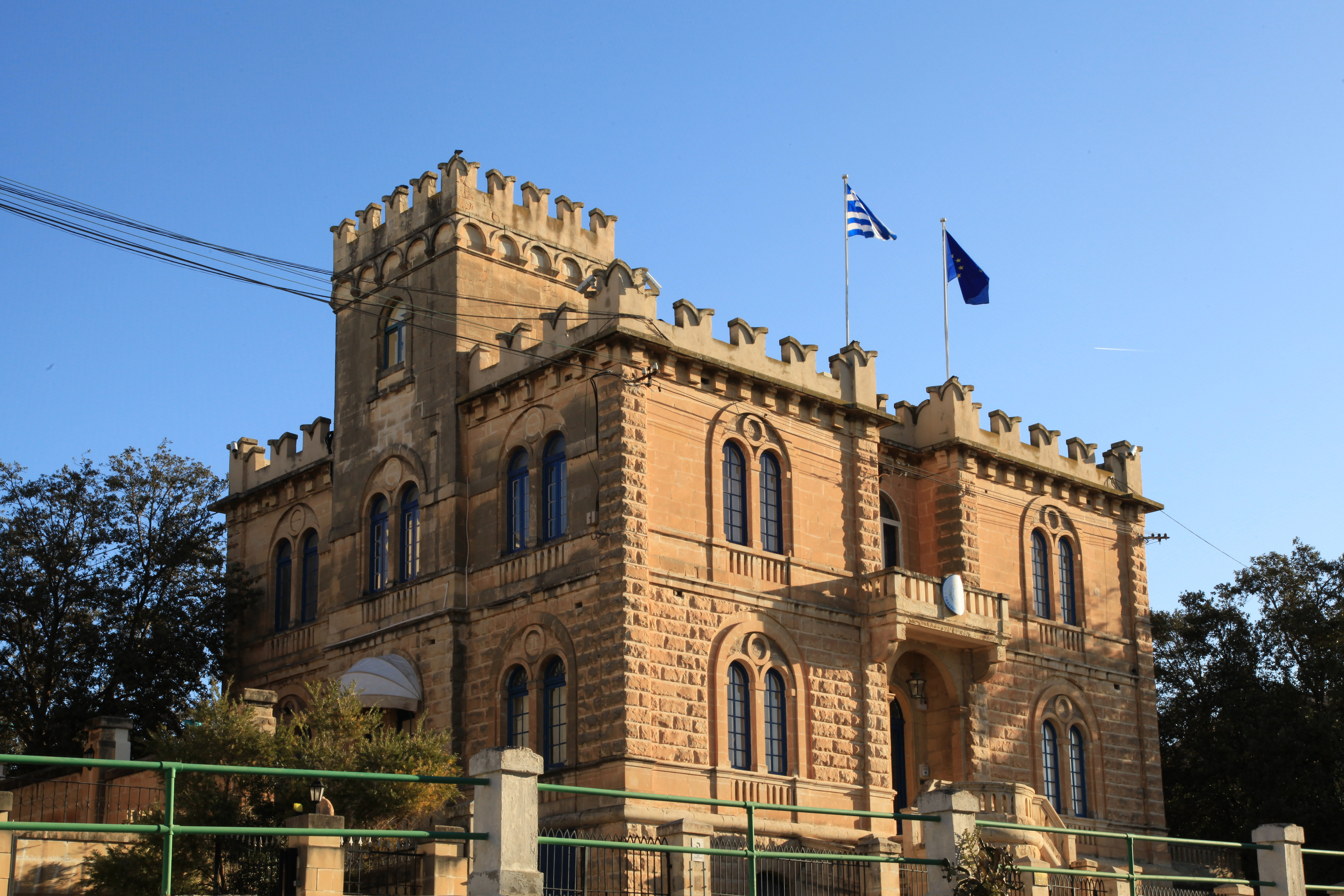
Greek Embassy in Ta' Xbiex, Malta

Since 2004, Greece has had an embassy in Valletta and accredited its first ambassador to Malta. Before that date, the Greek embassy in Rome was accredited for Malta. Malta has an embassy in Athens and two honorary consulates in Piraeus and Thessaloniki. The current Ambassador of Malta to Greece is H.E. Mr Joseph Cuschieri.

The two countries share membership of the European Union and of the Union for the Mediterranean.

== History ==
The Greeks have had connections with Malta since ancient times (see Greeks in Malta).

The Greek revolutionary Rigas Feraios, in his work Thourios, also addresses the inhabitants of Malta, asking them to support a revolution against the Ottoman Empire. In fact, he emphasizes that "Greece" is requesting this help, "seeking assistance with a motherly voice." In verses 83–86, he writes:

Μ’ εμάς κ’ εσείς Μαλτέζοι, γενήτ’ ένα κορμί,
Together with us, you Maltese, become one body,

κατά της Τυραννίας ριχθήτε με ορμή.
rush with force against Tyranny.

Σας κράζει η Ελλάδα σας θέλει, σας πονεί,
Greece is calling you, she needs you, she cares for you,

ζητά την συνδρομήν σας με μητρικήν φωνή.
she asks for your support with a motherly voice.

== List of bilateral visits ==
- Visit by the then Prime Minister of Greece Costas Simitis to Valletta (24–25 May 2001) in his capacity as President of the European Council.
- Visit to Greece by the then President of Malta, Guido de Marco (11–13 September 2002).
- Visit by the Prime Minister of Greece Kostas Karamanlis visited Malta between 9 and 11 October 2008 and had meetings with the President of Malta, Edward Fenech Adami, Prime Minister of Malta Lawrence Gonzi and the Leader of the Opposition, Joseph Muscat.
- Meeting between Maltese PM Joseph Muscat and Greek PM Alexis Tsipras in Athens (March 1, 2017)
- Meeting between the Maltese President George Vella and Greek President Katerina Sakellaropoulou in Athens (July 5, 2023)

== Bilateral agreements ==
- Commercial Agreement (1976)
- Agreement on Scientific and Technical Cooperation (1976)
- Cultural Agreement (1976)
- Agreement on Economic, Industrial and Technical Cooperation (1980)
- Agreement on Air Transport (1999)
- Cooperation Agreement regarding Civil Protection (2001)
- Agreement on Police Cooperation (2001)
- Convention on the Avoidance of double taxation (2006)

== Cultural relations ==
Following a Greek Government donation in 1992, a Greek Park was created in Malta and inaugurated on 26 January 1997 by the then Greek Foreign Minister Theodoros Pangalos.

== European Union ==
Greece joined the European Union in 1981. Malta joined the EU in 2004. Greece supported Malta's bid for EU membership.

== Resident diplomatic missions ==
- Greece has an embassy in Valletta.
- Malta has an embassy in Athens.

== See also ==
- Foreign relations of Greece
- Foreign relations of Malta
- Malta-NATO relations
- NATO-EU relations
- Greeks in Malta
- Corfiot Maltese
