= John S. Siemianowski =

American bishop-elect

His Excellency, The Most Reverend John Steven Siemianowski
- Auxiliary Bishop of Chicago; Titular Bishop of Gratianopolis
- Archdiocese: Chicago
- Appointed: December 20, 2024
- Installed: February 26, 2025
- Other post: Titular Bishop of Gratianopolis

Orders
- Ordination: May 20, 1989
- Consecration: February 26, 2025 by Blase J. Cupich, Robert Gerald Casey, and Jeffrey S. Grob

Personal details
- Born: May 26, 1960 (age 66) Chicago, Illinois, US
- Education: Southern Illinois University; Mundelein Seminary
- Motto: Make all things new

Styles of John S. Siemianowski
- Reference style: His Excellency; The Most Reverend
- Spoken style: Your Excellency
- Religious style: Bishop

John Steven Siemianowski (born May 26, 1960) is an American prelate of the Roman Catholic Church who has been serving as an auxiliary bishop for the Archdiocese of Chicago in Illinois since 2025

== Early life ==
John Siemianowski was born in Chicago on May 26, 1960, to Lydia and Joseph Siemianowski. As a teenager, he attended Morton East High School in Cicero, Illinois. He earned a Bachelor of Science degree in environmental sciences and a Secondary Education Certificate in 1982 from Southern Illinois University at Edwardsville. Deciding to become a priest, Siemianowski in 1984 entered University of St. Mary of the Lake Mundelein Seminary in Mundelein, Illinois. He received a Master of Divinity degree and a Baccalaureate in Sacred Theology degree in 1989.

== Priesthood ==
Siemianowski was ordained to the priesthood for the Archdiocese of Chicago on May 20, 1989. After his ordination, the archdiocese assigned Siemianowski as an associate pastor at the following Illinois parishes:

- St. Francis de Sales in Lake Zurich
- St. Mary in Buffalo Grove
- St. Elizabeth Seton in Orland Hills

Siemianowski was later named pastor of St. Agnes, St. Paul, and St. Kieran Parish, in Chicago Heights, Illinois. He became pastor in 2021 of St. Juliana Parish in Chicago.

== Auxiliary Bishop of Chicago ==
Pope Francis appointed Siemianowski as titular bishop of Gratianopolis and as an auxiliary bishop of Chicago on December 20, 2024. Siemianowski was consecrated as a bishop on February 26, 2025, at Holy Name Cathedral in Chicago by Cardinal Blase Cupich.

== See also ==
- Catholic Church hierarchy
- Catholic Church in the United States
- Historical list of the Catholic bishops of the United States
- List of Catholic bishops of the United States
- Lists of patriarchs, archbishops, and bishops

== Episcopal succession ==
Catholic Church titles
Preceded by -	Auxiliary Bishop of Chicago; 2025-present	Succeeded by -
