= Carcabia =

Titular see of the Roman Catholic Church

Africa Proconsularis (125 AD)

The Diocese of Carcabia is a titular see of the Roman Catholic Church.

Historically, three bishops are mentioned being from Carcabia:

- Victorian participated in the Council of Cabarsussi, held in 393 by Maximianus, a dissident sect of the Donatists, and they signed the acts; he was sentenced, along with the other bishops, in the Donatist Council of Bagai of 394.
- At the Council of Carthage the Donatist bishop Donatian was an attendee. The diocese at that time had no Catholic bishops.
- Simplicio attended the synod in Carthage in 484 called by the Vandal king Huneric, after which Simplicio was exiled.

Today Carcabia survives as titular bishopric: the current bishop is Manuel Nin, Apostolic Exarch of Greece from 2016 to 2026, now apostolic exarch of the territorial abbey of Saint Mary of Grottaferrata, Italy.
