= Greek Catholic Church =

The Greek-Catholic churches or Byzantine Catholic churches, are sui iuris churches (of their own rite) which fall within the "Eastern Catholic Churches" or "Catholic Churches of Eastern rite", which constitute the corpus of churches in communion with the Bishop of Rome and observing, by long tradition, the Byzantine Rite. These bodies of churches were traditionally called "Greek-Catholic" to highlight the "Greek" origin of the rite as contrasted with the Latin Church of the west. Despite using the word Greek, the vast majority of Byzantine Catholics come from the Slavic Byzantine tradition, with Ukrainian Catholics being the largest body.

== Greek rites ==
The Greek Catholic Church may refer to the Eastern Catholic Churches that use the Byzantine Rite, also known as the Greek Rite:

- Albanian Greek Catholic Church
- Belarusian Greek Catholic Church
- Bulgarian Greek Catholic Church
- Greek Catholic Church of Croatia
- Greek Byzantine Catholic Church
- Hungarian Greek Catholic Church
- Italo-Albanian Catholic Church
- Macedonian Greek Catholic Church
- Malta Greek Catholic Church
- Melkite Greek Catholic Church
- Romanian Greek Catholic Church
- Russian Greek Catholic Church
- Ruthenian Greek Catholic Church
- Slovak Greek Catholic Church
- Ukrainian Greek Catholic Church
- Any other Eastern Catholic group that uses the Byzantine Rite:
- Georgian Byzantine-Rite Catholics
  - An Ordinariate for Eastern Catholic faithful
