= Gratianopolis =

Gratianopolis ("city of Gratian") may refer to:

- Gratianopolis, the Roman name for Grenoble
- Gratianopolis (Mauretania Caesariensis), a Roman city in North Africa
- Gratini, Gratianoupolis, or Gratianou, a city in Thrace
