= Cathedral of the Holy Spirit, Istanbul =

Coordinates: 41°02′41″N 28°59′08″E

Holy Spirit Cathedral of Istanbul
- Saint Esprit Kilisesi
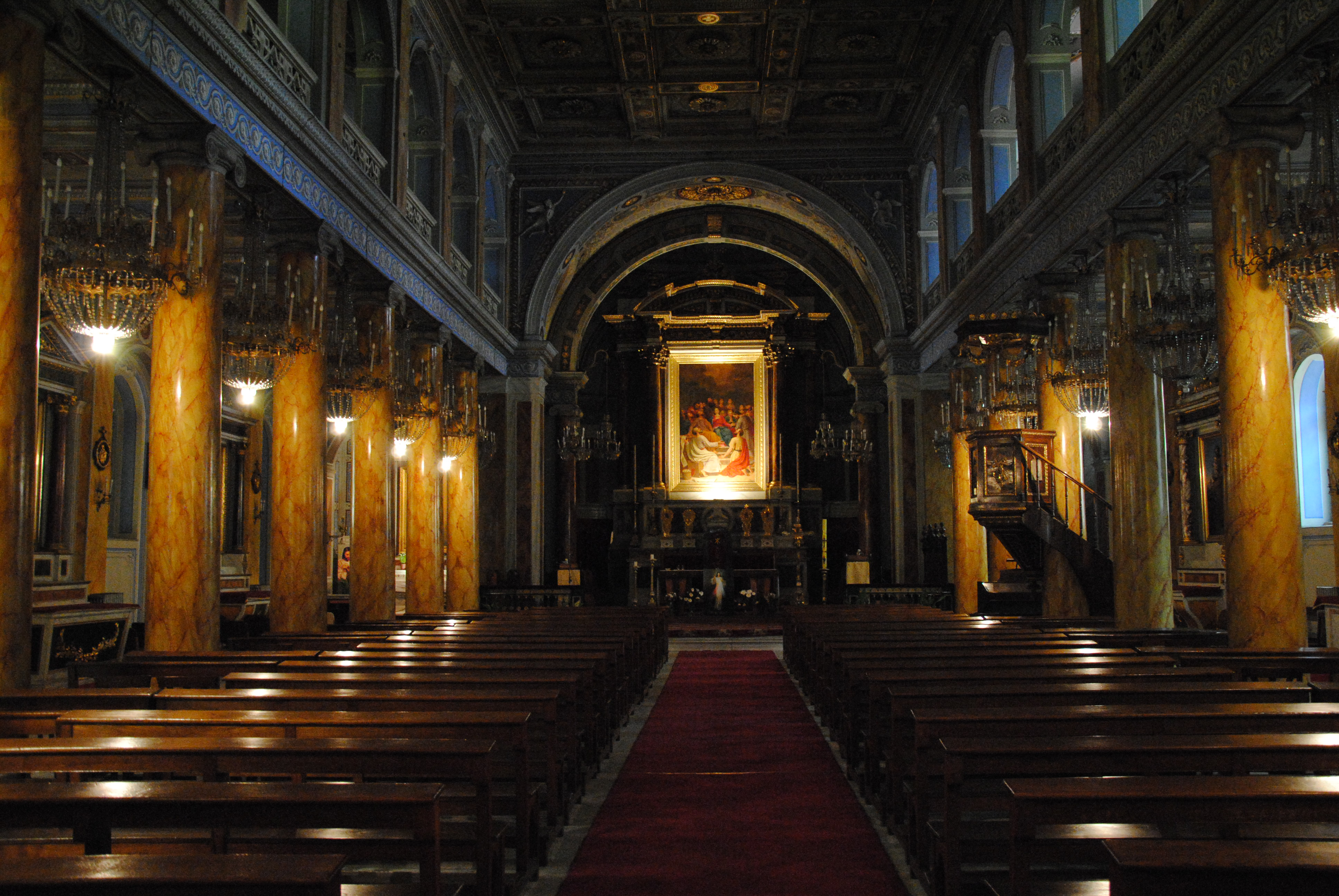
- Nave and sanctuary of the cathedral, 2010
- Holy Spirit Cathedral of Istanbul
- Location: Istanbul
- Country: Turkey
- Denomination: Roman Catholic Church

History
- Dedication: Holy Spirit
- Dedicated: 1846

Architecture
- Functional status: active
- Architect(s): Giuseppe Fossati and Achille Bottazzi
- Style: Baroque
- Groundbreaking: 1845

Administration
- Metropolis: Holy See
- Diocese: Apostolic Vicariate of Istanbul

Clergy
- Bishop: Massimiliano Palinuro

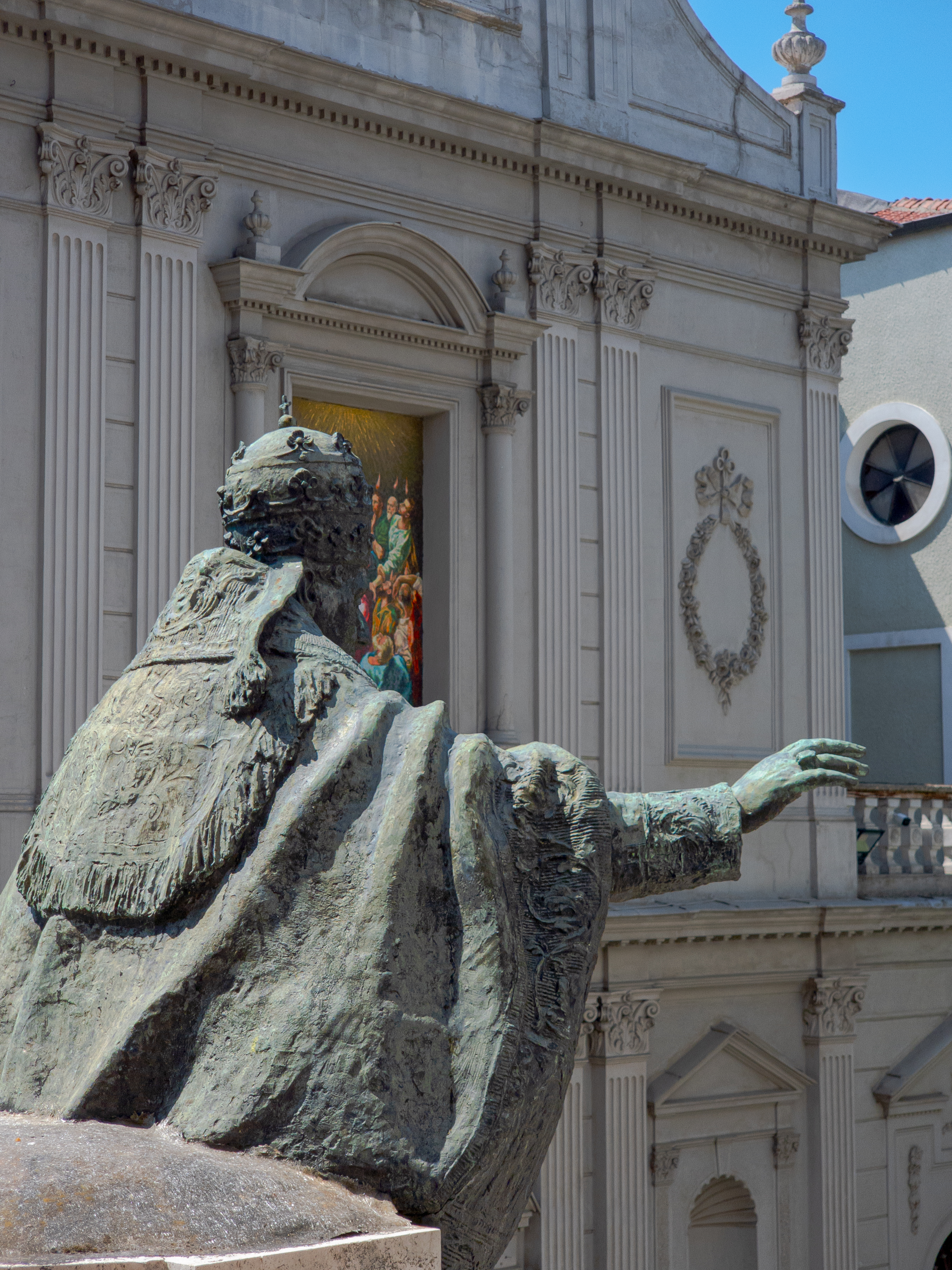
The façade and statue of Pope Benedict XV, as seen from Notre Dame de Sion Istanbul

The Cathedral of the Holy Spirit, also called the Saint Esprit Cathedral (Turkish: Saint Esprit Kilisesi), is a Catholic church Istanbul, Turkey, on Cumhuriyet Avenue 127/A in the Pangaltı quarter of Şişli district, the former Harbiye. It is the episcopal see of the Aposotolic Vicar of Istanbul, as it contains his actual cathedra (throne). The 19th-century cathedral is adjacent to Lycée Notre Dame de Sion Istanbul high school, and a statue of Benedict XV is a feature of the courtyard.

Located between Taksim Square and the Nişantaşı quarter, the cathedral is the second-largest Catholic church in the city after the Basilica of S. Antonio di Padova on İstiklal Avenue in Beyoğlu. The basilica was built in Baroque style in 1846 under the direction of Swiss-Italian architect Gaspare Fossati and Italian architect Achille Bottazzi. The project was under the French archbishop Julien Hillereau, the Vicar Apostolic from 1835 to 1855, who is entombed in the cathedral's crypt.

== History ==
Gaspare Fossati was a Swiss-Italian architect working in Istanbul in the 19th century. He is the second European architect to have come to Istanbul to work when Western-style architecture began to be popular across the city. He built many famous 19th-century buildings including Narmanlı Han (formerly the Russian Embassy); the Consulate of the Netherlands; and Saint Peter and Paul Church in Galata. The Fossati brothers, Gaspare and Giuseppe, also worked on the restoration of the Hagia Sophia.

The site of the cathedral was chosen by the Holy See as it had established an unofficial office in Istanbul on the same street. This facility later became official in 1960, when Turkey and the Holy See established formal bilateral relations.

Construction took a year, ending in 1846. Following the cathedral's dedication, the Christian community began settling nearby, beyond the Beyoğlu district (formerly known as Pera) and Galata areas which were then predominantly non-Muslim. Financial difficulties led to poorer quality construction materials and an earthquake in 1865 heavily damaged the structure. Restoration began in June of the same year, and the church reopened a few months later in December. Architect Pierre Vitalis, along with architect Achille Bottazi, planned to rebuild Holy Spirit Cathedral following the earthquake, but this was abruptly halted by Vitalis’ retirement. The cathedral's reconstruction was resumed by Father Antoine Giorgiovitch.

According to historical sources, the church was elevated to the status of a cathedral in 1876. It has undergone several restorations since, receiving three new bells forged in Fermo, Italy in 1922, and having all its paintings restored under the late Vicar Apostolic Antuvan Marovitch in 1980. Administrative rights over the cathedral were passed to the Salesians of Don Bosco on October 9, 1989.

== Description ==
The architecture of the cathedral is a basilica plan, with three naves in the Baroque style. Some art historians define the cathedral's architecture as the revival of the early Christian basilica type. The main apse and two side apses have a square shape, while the façade has a copy of El Greco’s Pentecostés.

The gallery rests upon two rows of columns topped with Ionic capitals, which separate the naves. The walls are decorated with frescoes, particularly for the side altars, while the coffered ceiling runs the length of the nave until the sanctuary. Above the marble high altar is the altarpiece, a rendition of The Descent of the Holy Spirit (Pentecost) by Belgian painter Joseph De Cauwer. There are two pulpits: a wooden one with its matching abat-voix on the epistle side of the nave; and the present marble one, with carved eagle lectern on the gospel side of the sanctuary. Lighting comes from crystal electric chandeliers hanging throughout the nave and sanctuary. Above the choir loft is the narthex, containing the pipe organ.

The cathedral crypt contains vaults, already part of the building since its construction, housing the mortal remains of various members of Istanbul's Catholic community. Noted burials include nuns from Notre Dame de Sion; Archbishop Hillereau; and Giuseppe Donizetti, royal musician to the court at the invitation of Ottoman Sultan Mahmud II. Donizetti had composed two military marches for Mahmud II and Abdülmecid I (the Mahmudiye March), and his family’s archives found in the 1970s are now at Topkapı Palace Museum Library. Burials in the cathedral vaults continued until the 1920s.

== Papal associations ==
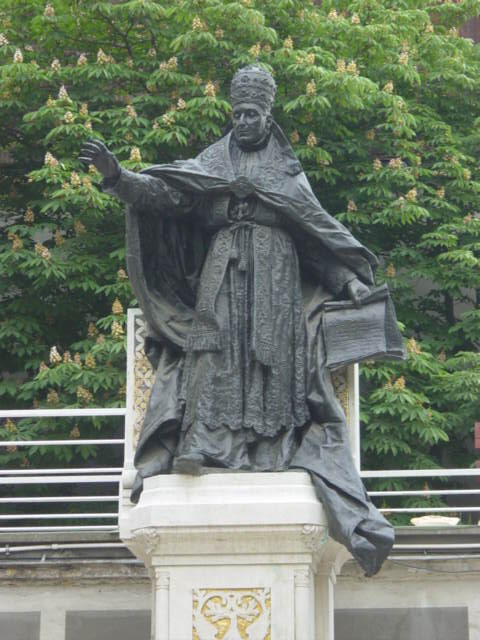
Statue of Pope Benedict XV in the cathedral courtyard.

The courtyard has a bronze statue of Pope Benedict XV (1854-1922), given by the Turkish state in 1922 in remembrance of his support to Turkish troops. Benedict XV, who reigned from 1914 to 1922 and is known for his efforts to stop World War I, helped establish a hospital on the Turkish-Syrian border to treat wounded Turkish soldiers. The statue’s stone pedestal has a plaque reading: "Benefactor of all people, regardless of nationality or religion." Sultan Mehmet VI is thought to have donated 500 gold lira to raise funds for the statue. The statue was cleaned by Istanbul Metropolitan Municipality in 2006, shortly before Pope Benedict XVI visited the city.

The bell tower on one corner overlooks Ölçek Sokak (street), which has also borne the name "Papa Roncalli Sokak" since 2000 when Mustafa Sarıgül, Mayor of Şişli, dedicated it to Angelo Giuseppe Roncalli (later Pope John XXIII). While still bishop, Roncalli was appointed by Pope Pius XI as Apostolic Delegate to Turkey and Greece, serving from November 1934 to December 1944. He became known in local circles as "the Turcophile Pope."

The cathedral has also been a destination for several reigning popes on their visits to Turkey, including Pope Paul VI, Pope John Paul II, Pope Benedict XVI, Pope Francis and Pope Leo XIV. On November 29, 2014, Pope Francis visited the cathedral to celebrate Mass for a thousand people. He returned the next day on the Feast of Saint Andrew to meet over a hundred Iraqi and Syrian refugees, as well as African migrants. His planned return did not proceed as he fell ill and died on April 21, 2025, so his successor Pope Leo XIV took up the journey later that year. Pope Leo XIV visited the cathedral to meet local Catholics and officials on November 28, 2025, the second day of his apostolic journey to Turkey and Lebanon, when he also marked the 1,700th anniversary of the First Council of Nicaea and the Nicene Creed.

== See also ==
- Catholic Church in Turkey
- Church of St. Anthony of Padua, Istanbul
- Latin Church in the Middle East#Turkey
- Levantines (Latin Christians)
