= Isaias Papadopoulos =

Greek clergyman (1855-1932)

- Titular Bishop of Gratianopolis
- Native name: Ησαΐας Παπαδόπουλος
- Church: Greek Byzantine Catholic Church
- In office: 28 June 1911 – 19 January 1932
- Predecessor: Ferdinand Jan Nepomucký Kalous
- Successor: Dionisio Leonida Varouhas

Orders
- Ordination: 1882
- Consecration: 21 January 1912 by Michael Mirov

Personal details
- Born: 24 February 1855 Pyrgos, Elis Province, Kingdom of Greece
- Died: 19 January 1932 (aged 76)

Bishop Isaias Papadopoulos (24 February 1855, Pyrgos, Greece – 19 January 1932) was the first Exarch of the Greek Byzantine Catholic Church.

== Biography ==
Born 24 February 1855 in Pyrgos, Papadopoulos was ordained an Orthodox priest in 1882. In 1883, he converted to Greek Catholicism beside a small group of Greek Orthodox in Thrace. In 1907, he had built the church in Thrace and was appointed vicar general for the Greek Catholics within the Apostolic Delegation of Constantinople.

In 1911, he received episcopal consecration and was put in charge of the newly established ordinariate for Greek Byzantine Catholic Church, which later became an exarchate. On 28 June 1911, he was appointed Titular Bishop of Gratianopolis and was ordained bishop on 21 January 1912. In 1928, he was named Assessor of the Congregation for the Oriental Churches by Pope Pius XI. Papadopoulos died on 19 January 1932, aged 76.

== See also ==
- Greek Catholic Apostolic Exarchate of Istanbul

== Sources ==
- Frazee, Charles A. (2006) [1983]. Catholics and Sultans: The Church and the Ottoman Empire 1453-1923. Cambridge: Cambridge University Press. ISBN 9780521027007.
