= Greek Catholic Apostolic Exarchate of Istanbul =

Eastern Catholic ecclesiastical jurisdiction in Turkey

Coordinates: 41.0369°N 28.9775°E

Apostolic Exarchate of Constantinople

Location
- Country: Turkey
- Metropolitan: Exempt directly to the Holy See

Information
- Denomination: Catholic Church
- Sui iuris church: Greek Byzantine Catholic Church
- Rite: Byzantine Rite
- Established: 11 June 1932
- Cathedral: Holy Trinity Cathedral in Istanbul

Current leadership
- Pope: Leo XIV
- Bishop: Sede vacante
- Apostolic Administrator: Massimiliano Palinuro

The Greek Catholic Apostolic Exarchate of Constantinople (Exarchatus Apostolicus Constantinopolitanus) is an Apostolic Exarchate (a missionary pre-diocesan structure) of the Greek Byzantine Catholic Church which is an Eastern Catholic Church. As a sui iuris (autonomous) Church, it is in full communion with the Holy See. In its liturgical services it uses the Byzantine Rite in the Greek language. It is effectively defunct.

The exarchate is exempt, which means that it is directly subject to the Holy See, as the Greek Catholic Church does not have a metropolitan bishop. Its geographic remit includes the entire territory of Turkey. Its cathedral church is the Cathedral of the Holy Trinity which is situated in Istanbul. As of 2017, it was the sole parish of the exarchate and had 16 parishioners. The last resident Greek-Catholic priest in Constantinople died in 1997 and has not been replaced. The only regular services in the Church of the Holy Trinity are held by exiled Chaldean of the Chaldean Catholic Archeparchy of Amida living in the city.

== History ==
The first steps toward creating a particular jurisdiction for Greek Catholics of the Byzantine Rite in the European part of the Ottoman Empire were made in 1907, when Greek Catholic priest Isaias Papadopoulos was made vicar general for the Greek Catholics within the jurisdiction of the Apostolic Delegation of Constantinople.

The Greek Catholic Apostolic Exarchate of Constantinople (Istanbul) was founded on June 11, 1911, as the Greek Catholic Apostolic Exarchate of European Turkey. At the same time, on June 28 (1911), Isaias Papadopoulos was appointed titular bishop of Gratianopolis, and he was also entrusted with the initial organization of the newly formed Exarchate, but he was not appointed apostolic exarch. That question had to be postponed because of the breakout of Balkan Wars (1912-1913) when the Ottoman Empire lost most of its European territory, and the consequent breakout of First World War (1914–1918). The first apostolic exarch, George Calavassy, was appointed only after the war, in 1920.

On June 11, 1932, it lost territory to establish the Greek Catholic Apostolic Exarchate of Greece. In 1936, it was renamed as Apostolic Exarchate of Istanbul or of Constantinople. On November 25, 1999, Bishop Louis Pelâtre, A.A., Apostolic Vicar of the Roman Catholic Apostolic Vicariate of Istanbul, was named apostolic administrator of the exarchate. On April 16, 2016, Fr. Rubén Tierrablanca Gonzalez, O.F.M, was named administrator of the exarchate, with the retirement of Bishop Pelâtre. He also held the office of Apostolic Vicar of Istanbul.

== Ordinaries ==
- George Calavassy, Apostolic Exarch of Constantinople (July 13, 1920 – June 11, 1932), Titular Bishop of Theodoropolis of the Greeks; later Apostolic Exarch of Greek Catholic Apostolic Exarchate of Greece (Greece) (June 11, 1932 – November 7, 1957)
- Dionisio Leonida Varouhas, Apostolic Exarch of Constantinople (June 11, 1932 – death January 28, 1957), Titular Bishop of Gratianopolis;
- Domenico Caloyera, O.P., as Apostolic Administrator 'sede plena' (May 27, 1955 – January 28, 1957), next Apostolic Administrator 'sede vacante' (January 28, 1957 – 1976); later Metropolitan Archbishop of İzmir (Turkey) (December 7, 1978 – January 22, 1983)
- Louis Pelâtre, A.A., Apostolic Administrator (November 25, 1999 – 2016), Titular Bishop of Sasima (since July 9, 1992), Apostolic Vicar of Istanbul (Turkey) (July 9, 1992 – 2016), President of Episcopal Conference of Turkey (1995–2001), Apostolic Administrator (November 25, 1996 – 2016)
- Rubén Tierrablanca Gonzalez, O.F.M., Apostolic Administrator (April 16, 2016 – December 22, 2020), titular Bishop of Tubernuca
- Lorenzo Piretto, O.P., Apostolic Administrator (December 24, 2020 – September 13, 2021)
- Massimiliano Palinuro, Apostolic Administrator (September 14, 2021 – present)

== See also ==
- Catholic Church in Turkey
- Bulgarian Catholic Apostolic Vicariate of Istanbul
- Greek Catholic Church of Nazareth

== Sources ==
- Frazee, Charles A. (2006) [1983]. Catholics and Sultans: The Church and the Ottoman Empire 1453-1923. Cambridge: Cambridge University Press. ISBN 9780521027007.
