= Manuel Nin =

Spanish Benedictine and Apostolic Exarch for Byzantine Rite Catholics in Greece

His Excellency, The Most Reverend Manuel Nin OSB
- Apostolic Exarch of Greece, Titular Bishop of Carcabia
- Appointed: February 2, 2016
- Predecessor: Dimitri Salachas

Orders
- Consecration: April 15, 2016 by Dimitri Salachas

Personal details
- Born: 20 August 1956 (age 70) El Vendrell, Tarragona, Spain
- Denomination: Roman Catholic Church
- Coat of arms

Manuel Nin i Güell OSB (born 20 August 1956) is a Spanish Catholic prelate who served as Apostolic Exarch of Greece in the Greek Byzantine Catholic Church from 2016 to 31 January 2026. He is a member of the Benedictines.

== Life ==
Nin was born on August 20, 1956, in the town of El Vendrell in the Catalan province of Tarragona in Spain. He began his early studies in his hometown and completed them at the Colegio La Salle in Reus. After completing his studies, he entered the Abbey of Montserrat as a candidate on 20 September 1975, where he was received into the abbey's novitiate the following April. He professed temporary religious vows on 26 April 1977 and his solemn vows on 18 October 1980. He then began his studies toward his Baccalaureate in theology at the abbey's Theological School of Montserrat, during which time his concentration was on the classical languages of Latin, Greek and Syriac.

After completing those studies, in 1984 Nin was sent to study in Rome, where he pursued a licentiate in patristics at the Patristic Institute Augustinianum, with additional coursework at the Pontifical Oriental Institute and the Benedictine-run Pontifical Liturgical Institute, at the same time continuing his monastic formation at the Pontifical Atheneum of St. Anselm, an international center of studies for the Benedictine Order. He completed his coursework in 1987 and returned to his monastic community, where he was assigned to teach theology, patristics and an introduction to the Eastern Christian liturgy at his alma mater.

Nin returned to Rome in 1989 to work on his doctoral thesis. He completed his study of a Greek spiritual writer of the 5th or 6th century, titled John the Solitary: The Five Discourses on the Beatitudes, in late 1991 and successfully defended it the following January. He then stayed in Rome, teaching at the various institutes connected to his field of studies.

In 1994, Nin was named a consultor to the Congregation for the Eastern Churches, which supervises the interactions of these particular Churches with the Holy See. In January 1996, while still a religious brother, he was appointed to the staff of the Pontifical Greek College of Saint Athanasius as a spiritual director for the school, where he then took up residence. Around this time, he decided to seek Holy Orders and was ordained a deacon in Rome on 22 November 1997. He was ordained to the priesthood on 18 April of the following year, by Cardinal Lluís Martínez Sistach, the Archbishop of Tarragona. He was honored with the rank of archimandrite by the Melkite archbishop, Boutros Mouallem, S.M.S.P., the following year.

On 2 February 2016, Nin was appointed by Pope Francis as Apostolic Exarch of Greece and Titular Bishop of Carcabia, serving the Catholics of Byzantine rite resident in Greece, and on 31 January he was appointed as apostolic exarch of the territorial abbey of Saint Mary of Grottaferrata, in Italy.
