= Narmanlı Han =

Building in Istanbul, Turkey

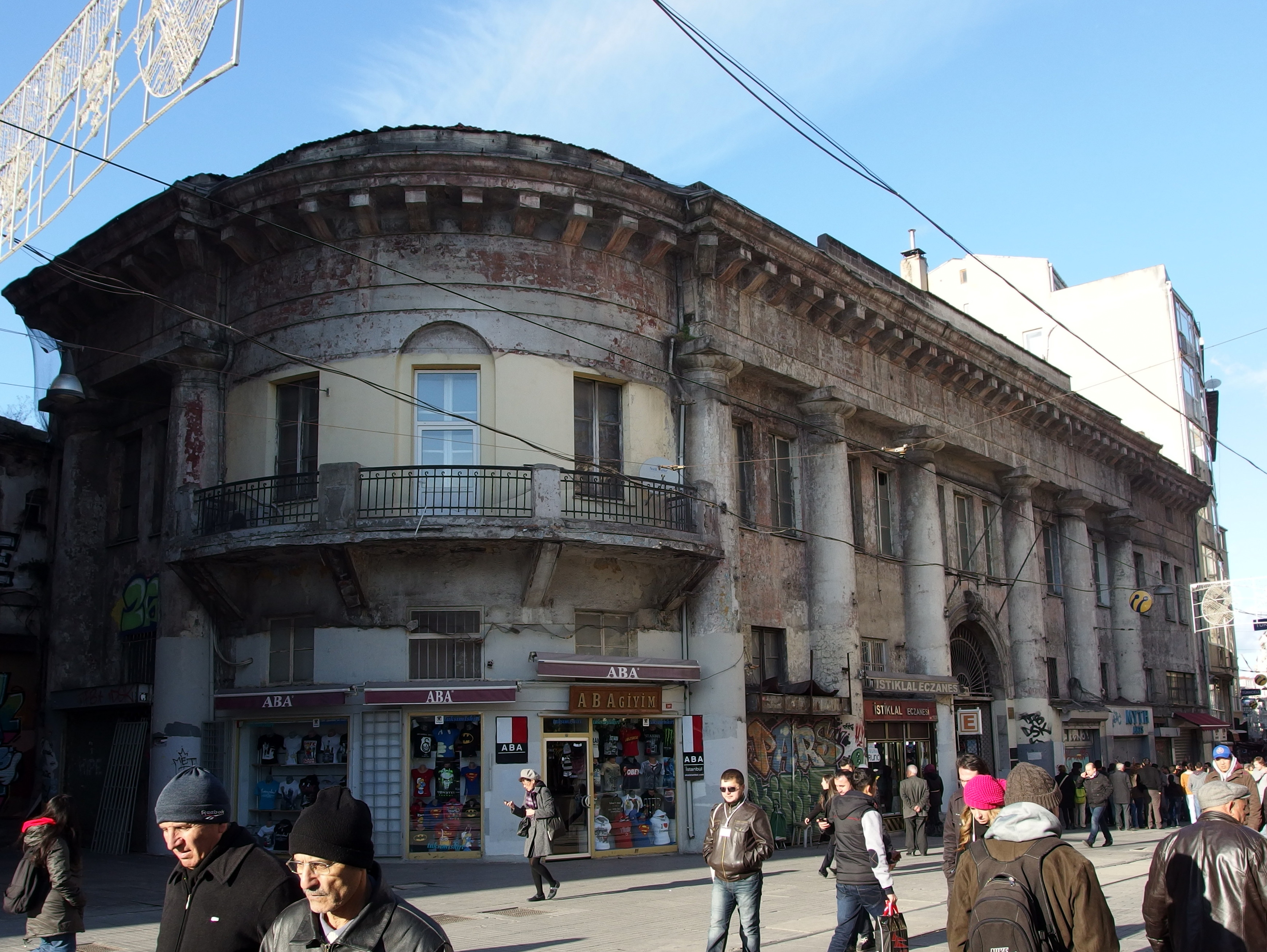
- The building before restoration work started in 2016
- Interactive map of the Narmanlı Han area

Narmanlı Han or Narmanlı Yurdu is a historical building located in Beyoğlu, Istanbul.

== History ==
Built in 1831, the building was used as the Russian Embassy until 1880 and then as a Russian prison until 1914. It later became the property of the Narmanlı family and was called Narmanlı Yurdu due to the family's Norman origin. Many writers and artists, especially Aliye Berger, Ahmet Hamdi Tanpınar and Bedri Rahmi Eyüboğlu, lived and worked in the building, which was used as a studio and residence in the following years. D Grubu, founded by five painters, opened its first exhibition in 1933 at the Mimoza hat shop below Narmanlı Yurdu.

Jamanak, one of the important publications of the Armenian press in Turkey, was headquartered here for a long time.

Today, there is only one notary office in the building. Although projects have been carried out to convert Narmanlı Han into a hotel since the early 1990s, an agreement has not yet been reached among the 11 owners. Finally, the notary also moved in 2010.

The building, which was used by the Russian embassy, was purchased by Avni and Sıtkı Narmanlı, the sons of Narmanlı Mustafa Efendi, originating from Erzurum's Narman district, who were engaged in trade and made real estate investments with their trade income. Parts of the building later began to be rented to artists at low rates and turned into a cultural center.

=== Restoration ===
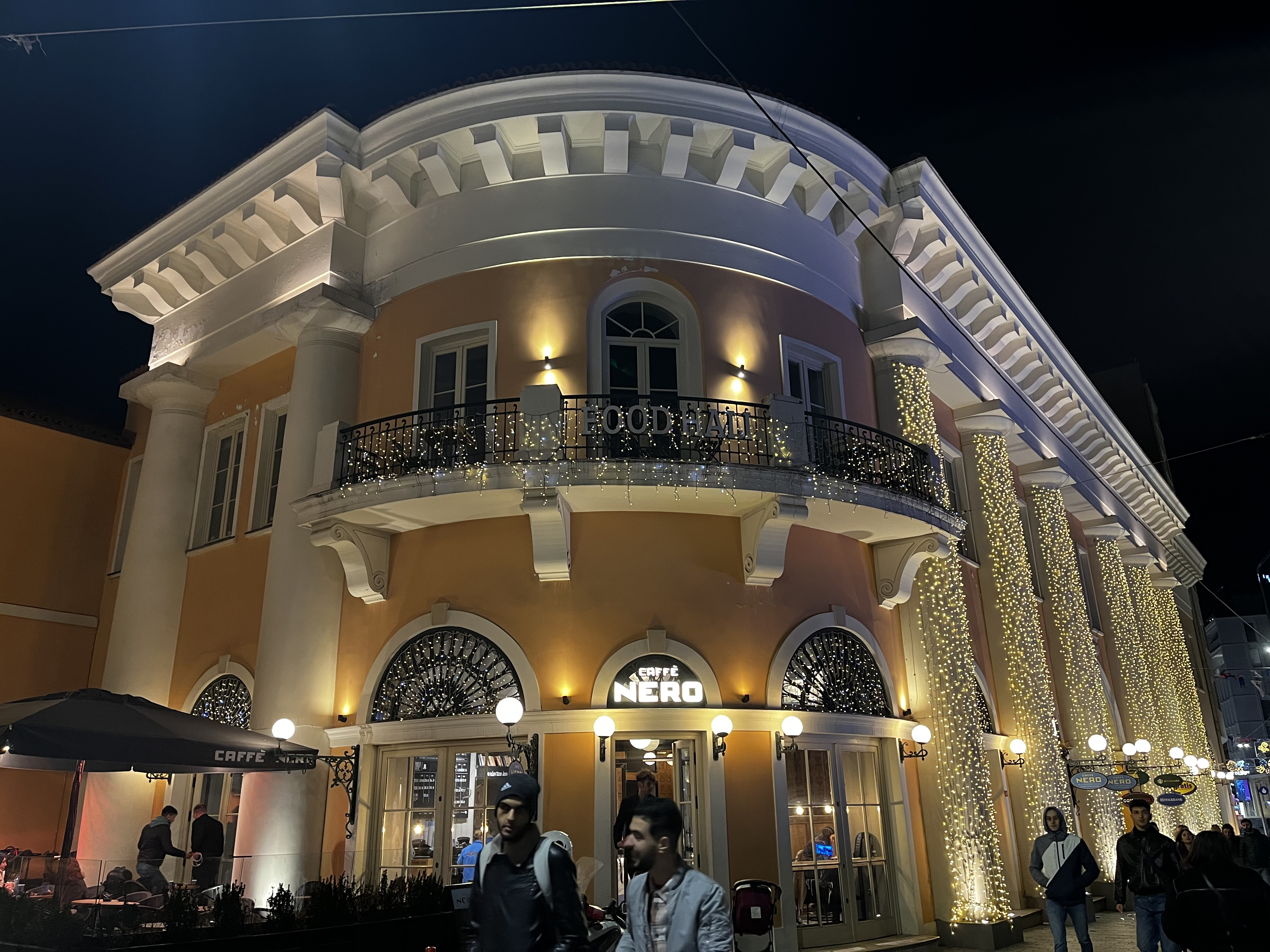
The building at night, 2023

Exploration work for restoration began in February 2011. The building was sold to the Esen and Erkul family, represented by Tekin Esen and Mehmet Erkul, in December 2013 for $57 million USD. The restoration work was approved by the Istanbul Regional Cultural Heritage Preservation Board No. II in 2015, and started in February 2016. Architect Sinan Genim's restoration project began to be followed by the public after Hürriyet writer Ertuğrul Özkök's visit with Beyoğlu Mayor Ahmet Misbah Demircan. The inn now hosts nine shops with its historic fountain in the courtyard.

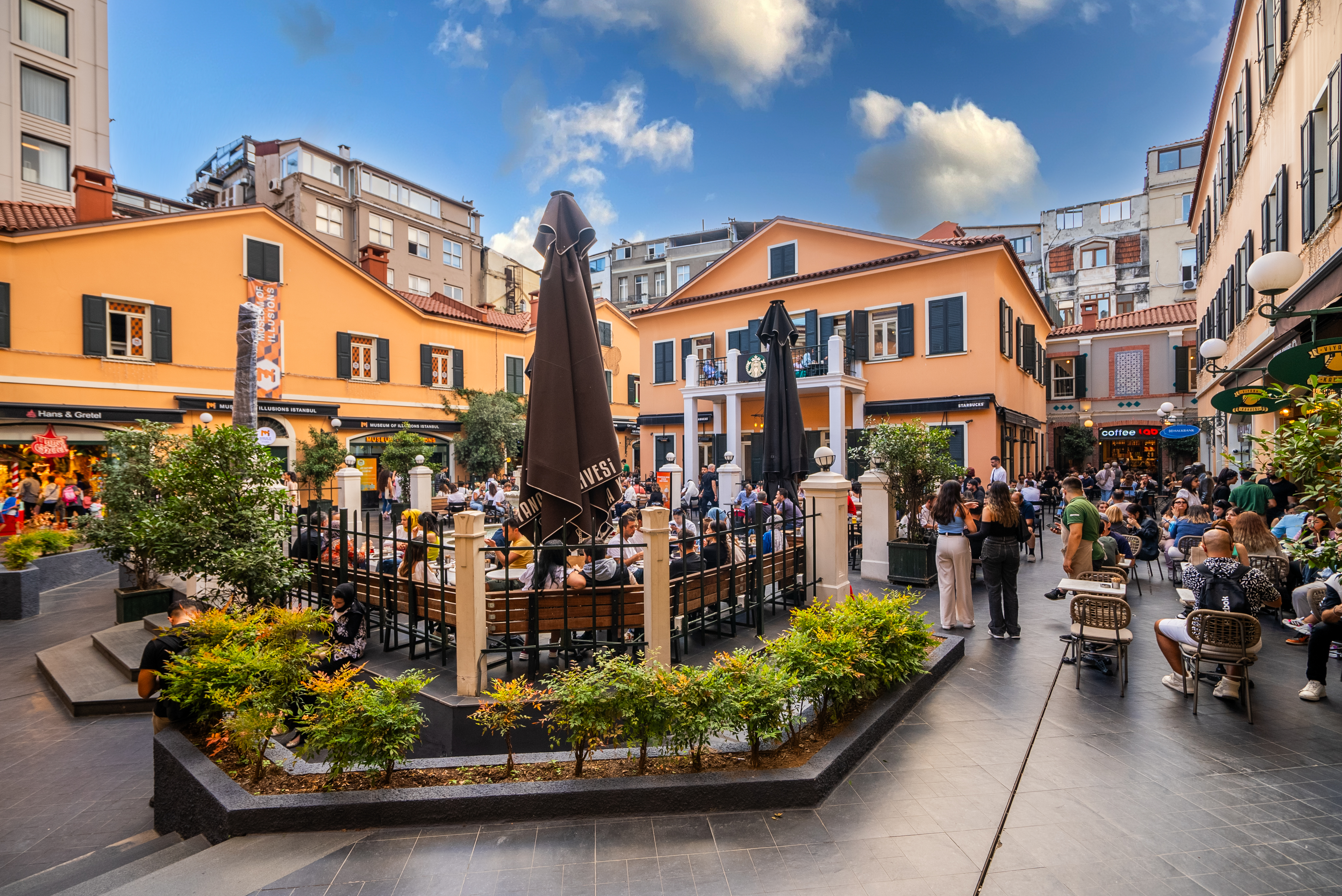

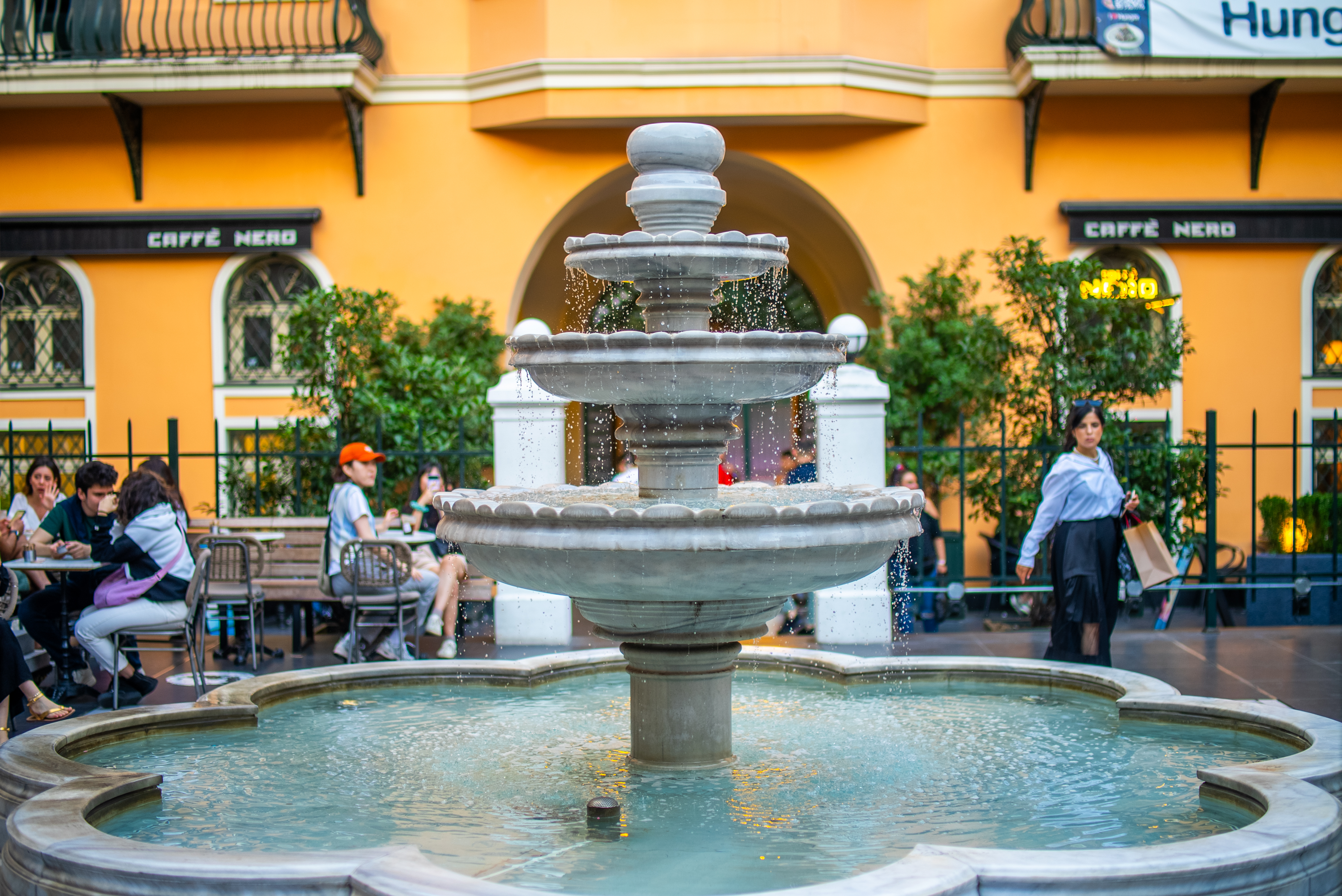

=== Summary of Narmanlı Han's History ===
Constructed in 1831 as the Russian Embassy by Swiss-Italian architect Giuseppe Fossati, who was invited to Istanbul by Ottoman Sultan Abdülmecit to restore Hagia Sophia, Narmanlı Han remains a historic landmark. In the early 19th century, it also served as a prison affiliated with the embassy until the embassy relocated to İstiklal Avenue. After the move the building was repurposed as offices for Russian companies, including Neft Syndikat and Intourist. In 1933, the Narmanlı Brothers acquired the building from Russian ownership, which had left it vacant for years following World War I. They rented out the worn-out units to artists due to low rent returns, attracting notable figures such as painter and poet Bedri Rahmi Eyüboğlu, painter Aliye Berger, writer Ahmet Hamdi Tanpınar, and sculptor Firsek Karol, alongside cultural enterprises like the Andre Bookstore and Jamanak Newspaper. By the late 20th and early 21st centuries, Narmanlı Han faced potential demolition due to long years of vacancy. In 2014, the Esen and Erkul families purchased the abandoned structure. Under a restoration project led by architect Sinan Genim, it was revitalized, restoring its status as one of Istanbul's most significant historical monuments.
