= Church of Our Lady of Damascus, Valletta =

Church of Our Lady of Damascus
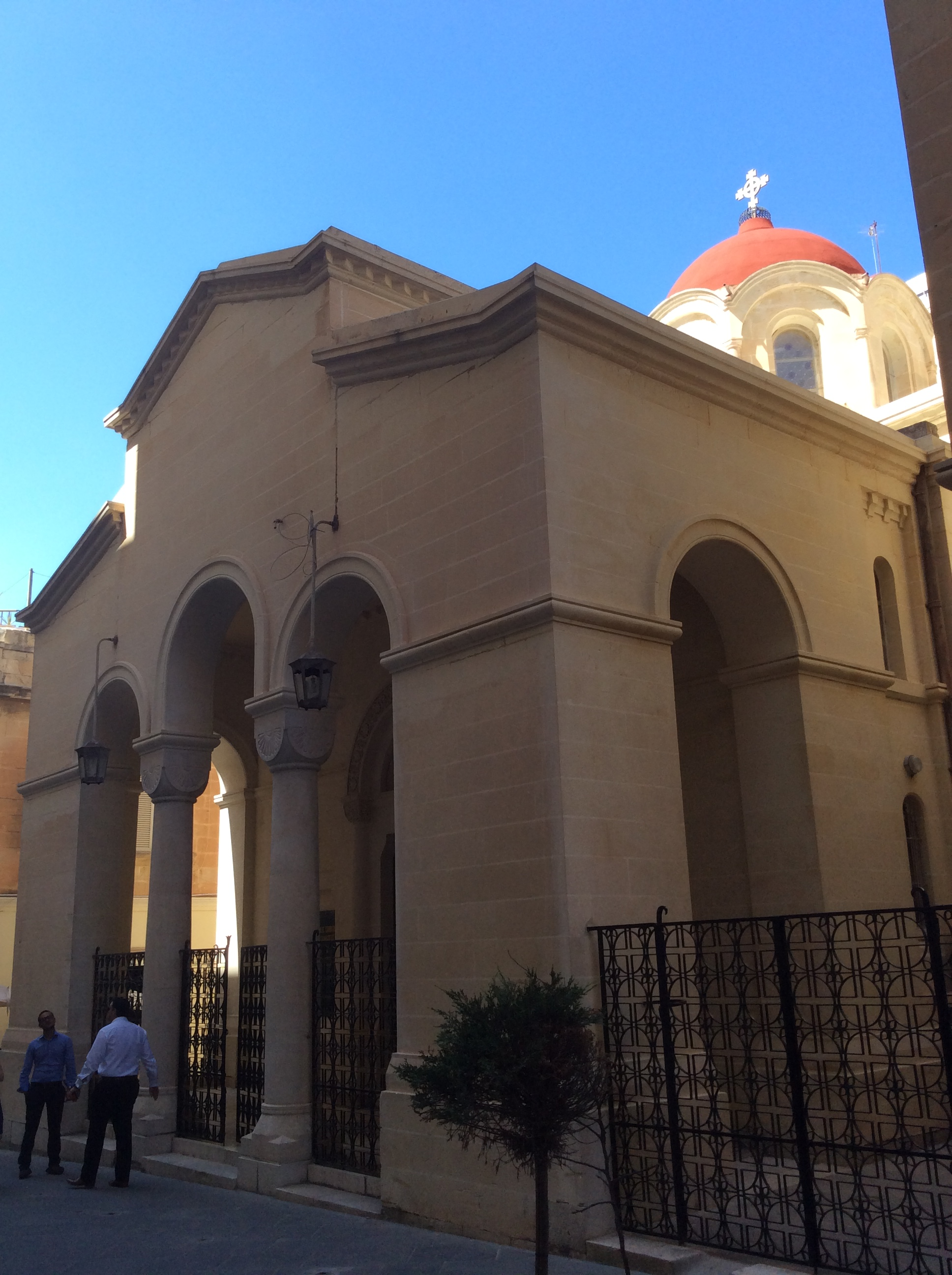

- Location within Malta
- 35°53′55.9″N 14°30′52.7″E
- Location: Valletta
- Country: Malta
- Denomination: Greek Catholic Church

History
- Status: Parish church
- Founded: 1580
- Dedication: Our Lady of Damascus
- Consecrated: 15 August 1951

Architecture
- Functional status: Active
- Architectural type: Church
- Style: Neo-Byzantine architecture

Administration
- Archdiocese: Malta

Clergy
- Rector: George Mifsud Montanaro

The Church of Our Lady of Damascus is a Greek Catholic Church in Valletta, in Malta, observing the Byzantine rite. It is also called Id-Damaxxena.

== Original Church ==
The original church was built upon the request of Giovanni Calamia to house the icon of Our Lady of Damascus brought over from Rhodes by the Knights of St John when they were expelled from the island by the Ottoman Empire. By 1580 the church was finished. In 1587 the Icon of Our Lady of Damascus was solemnly transferred from Vittoriosa to the new church.

== Present Church ==
On March 24, 1942, during one of the bombings of Valletta, the Church of Our Lady of Damascus was hit and completely destroyed. Many icons were lost under the debris of the church. It was because of the initiative of Italo-Albanian Papàs Gjergji Schirò from Piana degli Albanesi, that the Church was rebuilt and reconsecrated on August 15, 1951, by Archbishop Georgios Halavazis.

== Present use ==
The church is mainly used by the Catholic community of the "Greek rite" of Malta for Divine Liturgy. The church is also used by the Italo-Albanian Catholic Church, and now the Melkite Greek Catholic Church, by Armenian Orthodox Church, by Russian Orthodox, Ukrainian Orthodox and Belarusian Orthodox.

== See also ==
- Culture of Malta
- History of Malta
- List of Churches in Malta
- Religion in Malta
