= Greek Byzantine Catholic Church =

Eastern Catholic church

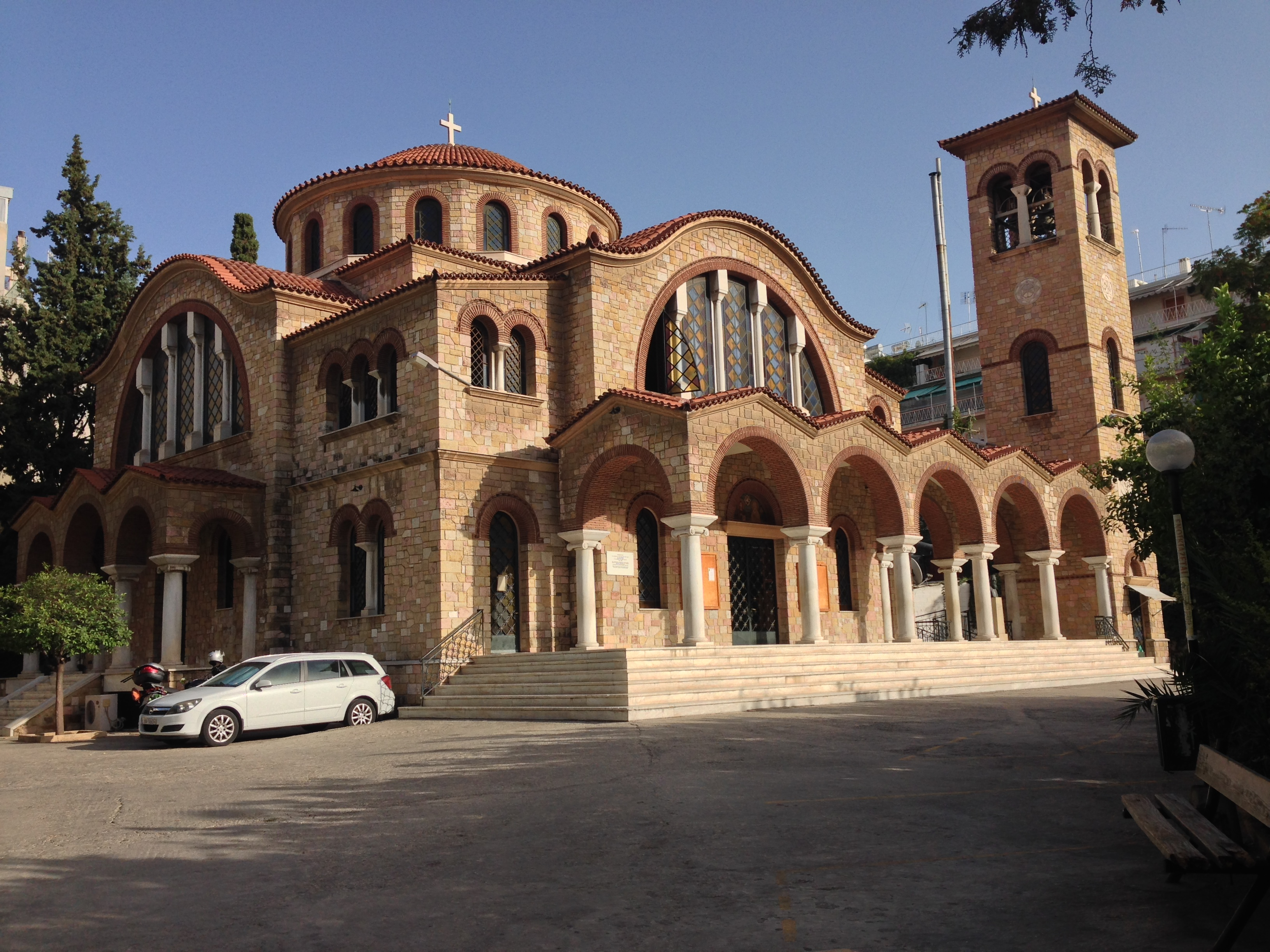
- Cathedral of the Holy Trinity, Athens
- Type: Particular church (sui iuris)
- Classification: Eastern Catholic
- Orientation: Eastern Christianity
- Scripture: Catholic Bible
- Theology: Catholic theology
- Polity: Episcopal
- Structure: Apostolic Exarchates
- Pope: Leo XIV
- Exarch of Greece: Sede vacante
- Exarch of Constantinople: Sede vacante
- Associations: Congregation for the Oriental Churches
- Region: Greece, Turkey
- Liturgy: Byzantine Rite
- Headquarters: Holy Trinity Cathedral in Athens and Holy Trinity Cathedral in Constantinople
- Origin: June 11, 1911
- Separated from: Church of Greece
- Branched from: Catholic Church
- Congregations: 4
- Members: 6,016
- Ministers: 11 (2010)

The Greek Byzantine Catholic Church (Greek: Ελληνόρρυθμη Καθολική Εκκλησία, Ellinórrythmi Katholikí Ekklisía) or the Greek-Catholic Church of Greece is a sui iuris Eastern Catholic particular church of the Catholic Church that uses the Byzantine Rite in Koine Greek and Modern Greek. Its membership includes inhabitants of Greece and Turkey, with some links in Italy and Corsica.

== History ==
There were several failed attempts to repair the East–West Schism between Greek and Latin Christians: the Council of Bari in 1098, the Council of Lyon in 1274, and the Council of Florence in 1439. Subsequently, many individual Greeks, then under Ottoman rule, embraced communion with the Catholic Church. They typically followed the Roman Rite of the Latin Church, maintaining their parishes through contact and support mostly from the Venetians.

However, it was not until the 1880s that a particular church specifically for Greek Catholics who followed the Byzantine rite was built in the village of Malgara in Thrace. Before the end of the 19th century, two more such churches were built, one in Constantinople and the other in Chalcedon.

In 1826, Catholic Jesuit priest John Marangos began a mission among the Orthodox Christians of Constantinople, where he managed the construction of a small community. In 1878, he moved on to Athens, where he died in 1885 after he had founded a church. In addition, he won over two small villages in Thrace to the Catholic faith.

After 1895, the Assumptionists began their mission in Constantinople, a seminary and two other small towns, founded in 1910; there were about 1,000 worshipers served by 12 priests, 10 of whom were Assumptionists.

In 1907, a native Greek priest, Isaias Papadopoulos, the priest who had built the church in Thrace, was appointed vicar general for the Greek Catholics within the Apostolic Delegation of Constantinople, and in 1911, he received episcopal consecration and was put in charge of the newly established ordinariate for Greek Byzantine Rite Catholics, which later became an exarchate. The particular church of Byzantine Rite Greek Catholics was being founded. Much more numerous were the Catholic Greeks of the Latin Church, who formed the majority of the population in some Aegean islands.

As a result of the conflict between Greece and Turkey after the First World War, the Greek Catholics of Malgara and of the neighbouring village of Daudeli moved to Giannitsa in Macedonia, where today lives a sizeable community, and many of those who lived in Istanbul emigrated or fled to Athens, one being the bishop who had succeeded to the position of exarch, and the religious institute of the Sisters of the Pammakaristos, founded in 1920.

In 1932, the territory of the Exarchate for Byzantine-Rite Greek Catholics was limited to that of the Greek state, and a separate Exarchate of Constantinople was established for those resident in Turkey. Continued emigration and anti-Greek nationalist incidents by Turks, such as the Istanbul Pogrom, extremely reduced the number of the Greek Catholics in Turkey. The last resident Greek-Catholic priest in Constantinople died in 1997 and has not since been replaced: the only regular services in the Greek-Catholic Church of the Holy Trinity there are held by exiled Chaldean Catholics living in the city.

== Current situation ==
The Greek islands of Syros and Tinos both have sizable Catholic populations, and vocations to the church ministry in the Greek Byzantine Catholic Church are largely drawn from these islands.

Bishop Manuel Nin (titular bishop of Carcabia) was the Apostolic Exarch of the Byzantine Rite Catholics in Greece from 2016 to January 2026.

Byzantine Rite Catholic Greeks in Greece number were mildly rising to 6,016 (6,000 in Greece and 16 in Turkey) as of 2017. In Athens, the main Greek Catholic church is the Holy Trinity Cathedral, Athens.

Although not under the jurisdiction of the Greek Byzantine Catholic Church, a Greek-Catholic community of the descendants of expatriated Greeks exists at Cargèse, in Corsica. A priest based in Athens, Archimandrite Athanasios Armaos, visits Cargèse several times a year to conduct services in the Greek church.

== Notable Byzantine Greek Catholics ==
Notable Greek Byzantines, or Eastern Catholics (also called Uniates for favouring the Union of the Churches) include:

- George Acropolites, historian
- George Metochites, deacon
- Bessarion, Cardinal
- Isidore of Kiev, Cardinal
- Theodorus Gaza, scholar
- Gregory III of Constantinople, Ecumenical Patriarch
- Leo Allatius, scholar
- Giuseppe Schirò, Arbëresh scholar

== Exarchs ==
- George Calavassy, from 1932 to 1957
- Hyakinthos Gad, from 1957 to 1975
- Anargyros Printezis, from 1975 to 2008
- Dimitri (Dimitrios) Salachas, from 2008 to 2016
- Manuel Nin, from 2016 to January 2026.

== See also ==
Related institutions outside Greece:

- Sant'Atanasio
- Pontifical Greek College of Saint Athanasius

Historical connections:

- Italo-Albanian Catholic Church (the Byzantine Catholic church of the Arbëreshë/Albanian minority in Italy)
