= Immigration to Malta =

Foreign population in Malta
Year	Population	% total
2005	12,112	3.0%
2011	20,289	4.9%
2012	23,365	5.5%
2021	115,449	22.2%
2022	137,376	25.3%
2023	158,368	28.1%
2024	173,700	30.9%

Immigration to Malta has increased significantly over the past decade. In 2011, immigration contributed to 4.9% of the total population of the Maltese islands in 2011, i.e. 20,289 persons of non-Maltese citizenship, of whom 643 were born in Malta. In 2011, most of migrants in Malta were EU citizens (12,215 or 60.2 per cent), predominantly from the United Kingdom (6,652 persons).

By the beginning of 2021, figures released by Malta's National Statistics Office showed that 20% of Maltese residents, or 103,718 people were foreigners. According to Malta's national employment agency, 70,402 of these non Maltese nationals were employed. Workers from EU countries made up 44% of the employed foreigners resident in Malta, while non-EU nationals represented 56% of Malta's foreign workforce. As of September 2021, foreign workers made up 27.9% of Malta's total workforce. The top employer for these foreign workers is the gambling and betting sector, which in Malta is made up of 58.6% of non-Maltese nationals.

Demographically, non-Maltese residents in Malta are predominantly males (52.5%) and younger than average (40.6 years of average age).

As of the end of 2020, the most popular location for foreigners to live in Malta was St Paul's Bay, where non-Maltese nationals made up 52% of the population. Sliema also has a substantial foreign population, with 43% of residents holding foreign passports as of the end of 2020.

== History of immigration to Malta ==
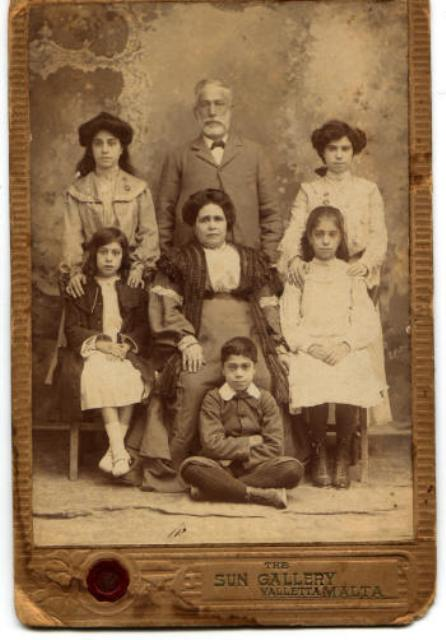
An early photograph of a Maltese Jewish family taken in Valletta, Malta

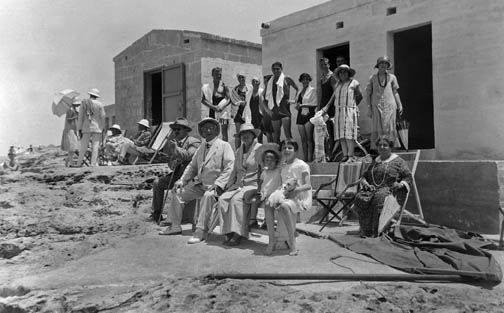
A photo thought to show some of the Russian refugees of 1919 in Malta. Some stayed at St Ignatius College, others at Tigne Barracks and Maria Feodorovna, her daughter and their entourage stayed at San Anton Palace

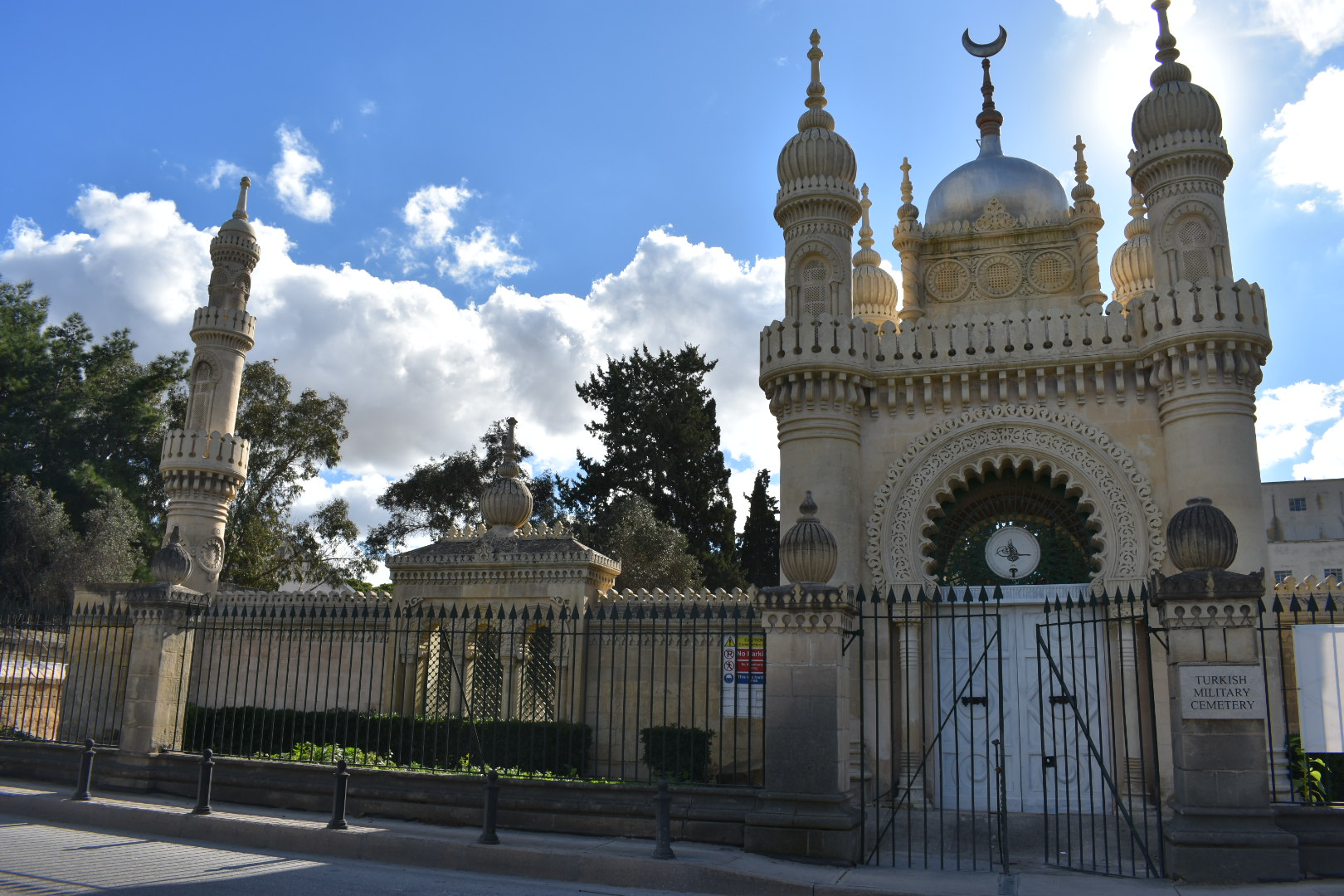
Turkish Military Cemetery in Marsa, Malta

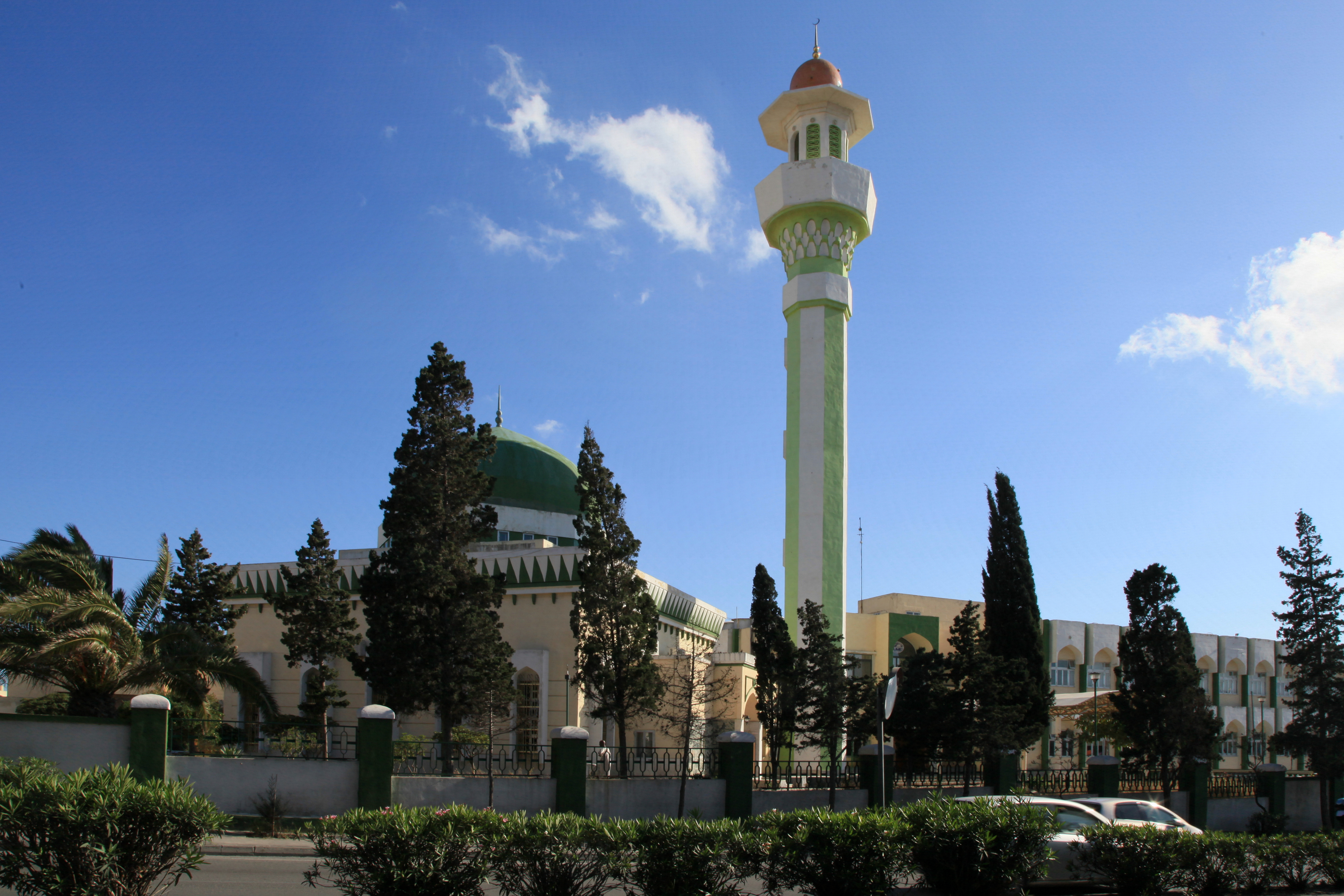
Mariam Al-Batool Mosque in Paola, Malta

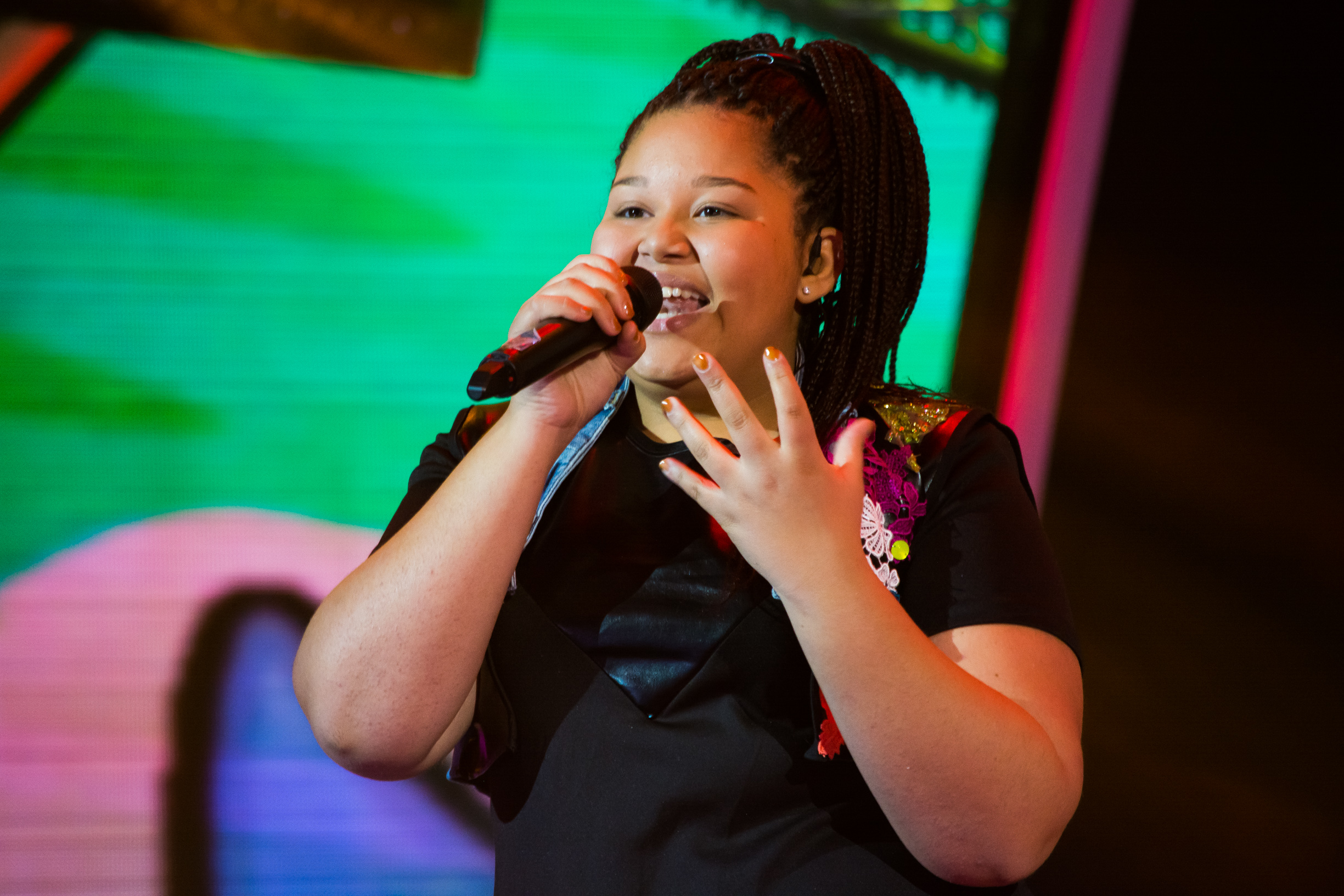
Destiny Chukunyere, second-generation Nigerian-Maltese

The current Maltese people, characterised by the use of the Maltese language and by Roman Catholicism, is the descendant - through much mixing and hybridation via different waves of immigration - of the Siculo-Arabic colonists who repopulated the Maltese islands in the beginning of the second millennium after a two-century lapse of depopulation that followed the Arab conquest by the Aghlabids in AD 870. A genetic study by Capelli et al. indicates that Malta was barely inhabited at the turn of the tenth century and was likely to have been repopulated by settlers from Sicily and Calabria who spoke Siculo-Arabic, the progenitor of modern Maltese. This is consistent with linguistic finding of no further sub-stratas beyond Arabic in the Maltese language, a very rare occurrence which may only be explained by a drastic lapse. Previous inhabitants of the islands - Phoenicians, Romans, Byzantines - did not leave any traces, as all place names were lost and replaced. Modern historiography thus contest the traditional "Christian continuity thesis", positing instead a period of total depopulation of Malta at the end of the late antiquity.

The Maltese islands remained largely Muslim-inhabited long after the end of Arab rule. The Arab administration was also kept in place and Muslims were allowed to practise their religion freely until the 13th century. As a result of this favourable environment, Muslims continued to demographically and economically dominate Malta for at least another 150 years after the Christian conquest.

Between 1194 and 1530, the Kingdom of Sicily ruled the Maltese islands and a process of full latinisation started in Malta. The conquest of the Normans would lead to the gradual Romanization and Latinization of the Siculo-Arabic Muslim population of Malta, and the subsequent firm establishment of Roman Catholicism. Until 1224, however, there remained a strong Muslim segment of society. By the end of the 15th century all Maltese Muslims would be forced to convert to Christianity and had to find ways to disguise their previous identities by Latinizing or adopting new surnames.

After the Norman conquest, the population of the Maltese islands kept growing mainly through immigration from the north (Sicily and Italy), with the exile to Malta of the entire male population of the town of Celano (Italy) in 1223 (though most of them returned home few years later), the stationing of a Norman (Swabian) and Sicilian garrison on Malta in 1240, the arrival of several thousands Aragonese soldiers in 1283 to 1425, and the settlement in Malta of noble families from Sicily and the Crown of Aragon between 1372 and 1450. As a consequence of this, Capelli et al. found in 2005 that "the contemporary males of Malta most likely originated from Southern Italy, including Sicily and up to Calabria."

Malta was then ruled by the Order of Saint John as a vassal state of the Kingdom of Sicily from 1530 to 1798. For the next 275 years, these famous "Knights of Malta" made the island their domain and made the Italian language official. The members of the Order came from the various noble families of Europe, thus providing Malta with a steady influx of affluent immigrants. Together with the Knights, in 1530, 400 (or up to several thousands according to other sources) Rhodian sailors, soldiers and slaves moved to Malta, possibly bringing along the few Byzantine words in Maltese language. Further immigration of several thousand Greek-rite Christians from Sicily in 1551 and again in 1566 may also have helped.

The 19th and first half of the 20th century were for Malta marked by membership in the British Empire. Its excellent harbours became a prized asset for the British, especially after the opening of the Suez Canal in 1869. The island became a military and naval fortress, the headquarters of the British Mediterranean fleet, with some 22,000 British servicemen posted in Malta from 1807 to 1979, as well as other British and Irish that settled in Malta over the decades. The islands also saw a steady influx of labourers from the other parts of the Empire, such as Indian textile traders from Sindh (see: Indians in Malta). In the same period, the learned class of Maltese society often identified with the Italians, particularly from the late 19th century Risorgimento period up to the Second World War (see: Italian irredentism in Malta). Up to 891 Italian exiles also sought refuge in Malta in the late 19th century.

At the same time, overpopulation and poverty pushed the Maltese to emigrate well into the 1960s and 70s, particularly to other British colonies such as Australia, South Africa, Canada and Egypt, but also to Great Britain, Gibraltar, Corfu and the United States.

The late 20th century saw the independence of Malta. Since this period, retired British servicemen and their families constitute the greatest part of foreign residents in Malta. Since 1959, Malta's British governor started to pursue a plan of economic development based on promoting tourism and tax competition, particularly offering very low tax rates on pensions, royalties and dividends to attract retired British settlers (referred to as 'sixpenny settlers') from other former colonies of the Empire. Malta saw a large influx of Britons from Rhodesia after 1967.

Closer links to Qaddafi's Libya since the 1970s saw a growth of Libyans in Malta, while around 800 Ugandan Indians were resettled in Malta after they had been expelled by Idi Amin in 1972. In the early 1990s Malta was a first stop for refugees from Iraq and Kuwait during the first Gulf War, later often resettled to North America. The arrival of African asylum seekers grew from 2001 onwards, particularly of citizens of Somalia, Nigeria, and Eritrea.

Membership of the European Union in 2004 led to the growth of a community of Maltese in Belgium, while skilled workers from other EU (Italy, Bulgaria, Germany, Sweden) and non-EU countries (Serbia, Pakistan) moved to Malta to contribute to the growing industries, from construction to hotel services, banking and ICT. Malta's EU accession also prompted a renewed public discussion about Maltese identity and its role of bridge between Europe and the Mediterranean. As noted by Schembri in 2004, the Maltese tended to stress their belonging to Europe as a way of distinguishing themselves from North Africans, and the public debate on immigration has reflected entrenched xenophobic stereotypes. The public attitudes of the Maltese towards both North Africans and Sub-Saharan Africans - including refugees and asylum seekers - have worsened over time, paralleled by the government's strict detention policies for irregular migrants.

Among the main immigrant communities in Malta:

- The Indian community in Malta (l-Indjani) was composed of nearly 7,000 persons in 2023, including 300 persons (45 families) stemming from the town of Hyderabad, Sindh (in today's Pakistan). They are Maltese citizens and reside in Malta since British times, originally as textile traders.
- The Arab community counted around 3,000 persons in 2007, mostly originally from Libya and today Maltese citizens. The presence of the Libyans in Malta, with the only mosque of the island (Mariam Al-Batool Mosque in Paola, Malta), amounts to the good relations between the Qaddafi and Mintoff governments in the 1970s and 1980s.
- The Albanians in Malta are a small community, originally arriving as refugees in 1999, when UNHCR resettled 110 persons from Kosovo to Malta.
- Nigerians in Malta are one of the most visible communities of recent immigration, despite their relatively low number. Several of them are football players in the island's over 50 football clubs. (see Ndubisi Chukunyere and his daughter Destiny)

== Legislation ==
Immigration to Malta is mainly regulated by the Immigration Act and by the Asylum Act. The Immigration Act, passed in 1970, was reformed in the run-up to Malta's EU accession, in 2000 and 2002, in order to align it with the EU acquis. Maltese law maintains a rigid protectionist approach to labour migration. A Work Permit Scheme permits immigrants to reside and work in the country for a certain period of time, if their skills are absent locally or in short supply. Permits are issued by the Department for Citizenship and Expatriate Affairs. Applications are examined by a cross-governmental board in a process taking three to four months. Permits are usually yearly and can be renovated; applications for renewal should be submitted five months in advance. Foreign investors holding substantial shares in the manufacturing or financial services can apply for indefinite-time permits of stay.

Work permits holders in Malta were 2,928 in 2003, of which 813 women. Most of them were issued to British citizens (387), then to "Yugoslavs"(306), Chinese (232), Indians (166), Bulgarians (146), Italians (143), Libyans (141).

The number of residence and work permits delivered by the Maltese authorities has steadily grown since, in particular under the Labour governments since 2013, from 653 in 2014 to 32,106 in 2021, with an average of 17,000 and a cumulative total of 134,324 in the 2014-2021 period.

Residence permits delivered by Malta

== Non-Maltese residents in Malta ==
At the 2005 census, the non-Maltese population numbered 12,112 (3.0% of the total population). It grew to 20,289 (4.9%) at the 2011 census, and to 115,449 (22.2%) at the 2021 census.

Of these, in 2005 people with British (4,713), Italian (585), German (518) and Libyan (493) citizenship were most common.

In 2011, the main foreign place of birth of residents in Malta included the United Kingdom (10,480) and other former British colonies like Canada (1,766) and Australia (4,354), as well as Italy (1,511), USA (1,246), Somalia (1,003) and Germany (951).

In 2021, the main communities included residents born in the UK (15,082), Italy (13,361), India (7,946), the Philippines (7,784) and Serbia (5,935).

The citizenship of resident foreign nationals is shown below:

The most common foreign places of birth for all residents are shown below:

Place of birth	2005 census	2011 census	2021 census
United Kingdom	4,713	10,480	15,082
(European Union) Italy	585	1,511	13,361
India			7,946
Philippines		464	7,784
Serbia		534	5,935
Australia		4,354	4,671
Libya	493	776	3,696
Russia		918	2,946
(European Union) Bulgaria		875	2,945
Canada		1,766	
USA		1,246	
Somalia		1,003	
(European Union) Germany	518	951	
(European Union) Romania		656	
Eritrea		507	
Egypt		454	
(European Union) Sweden		450	4000*
(European Union) France		417	
(European Union) Netherlands		412	
China		347	
Ethiopia		332	
Other EU Member States			21,922
Other European Countries			10,685
Other Countries			36,309

*Based on a separate 2022 census

== Visa policy ==
As an EU member state and a party to the Schengen Agreement, Malta applies the EU's visa policy. This means that to enter the country:

- Nationals of the EU and the European Economic Area (EEA) (Norway, Iceland and Liechtenstein) and their special territories and of Switzerland require only a passport or a national identity card, and can reside and work in Malta without any further permission or documents. For several years after Croatia joined the EU in 2013, Croatian nationals continued to need work permits to legally work in Malta; this requirement was finally abolished in February 2018.
- Nationals of a number of non-EU and non-EEA countries (including Ukraine, Balkan countries, Australia, New Zealand, South Korea, Malaysia, the United States and Japan) require only a passport and do not need a visa to reside in Malta for less than 90 days.
- Nationals of other countries need a passport and a visa to enter the country, visas being valid for one month.

== Asylum seekers ==
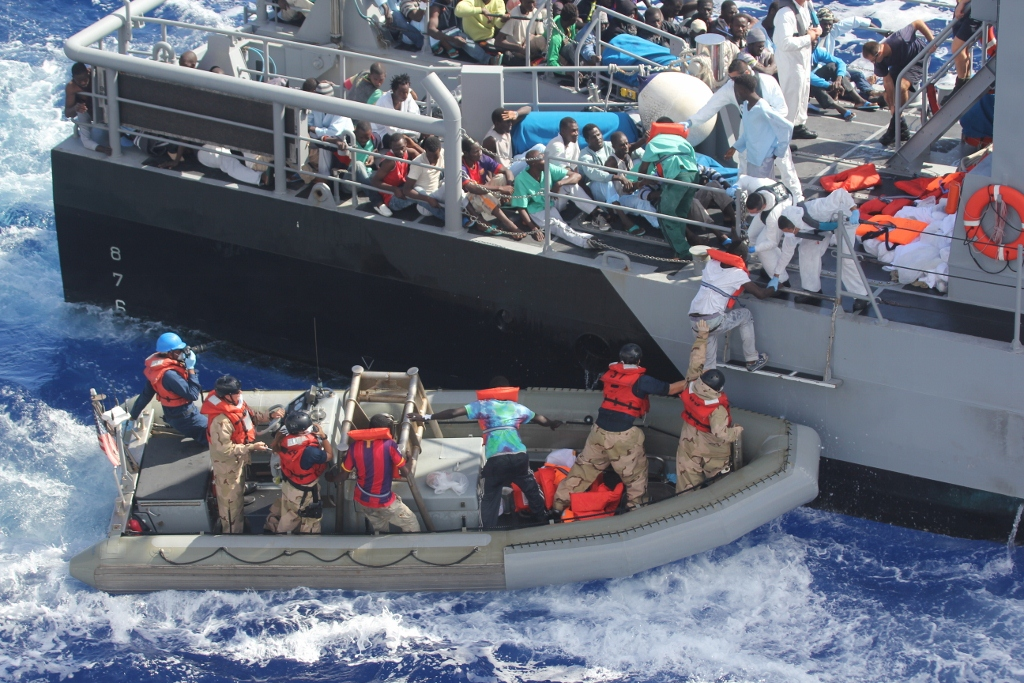
USS San Antonio rescued 128 men adrift in an inflatable raft after responding to a call by the Maltese Government. 17 October 2013.

Historically Malta gave refuge (and assisted in their resettlement) to eight hundred or so East African Asians who had been expelled from Uganda by Idi Amin and to just under a thousand Iraqis fleeing Saddam Hussein's regime. In 1990–1991, Malta hosted a number of Iraqi asylum-seekers, that were later resettled elsewhere, especially in North America.

A Refugee Act was passed in Malta only in 2001, replacing the Catholic Church-based Emigrant Commission, which had till then partnered with UNHCR. The Refugee Act implement Malta's obligations under the 1951 Refugee Convention and its 1967 Protocol, establishing a Refugee Commission (REFCOM). In its first year of implementation, the commission had to deal with 1,680 asylum seekers who reached Malta by boat in 2002. Persons who are recognised asylum or humanitarian protection are issued a residence permit and, upon request, a work permit.

As from 2001, Malta has received a high number of landings of migrants from sub-Saharan Africa, many of whom were entitled to international protection. 2006 and 2007 saw about 1800 arriving each year. Landings included 1173 people in 2009, 28 in 2010, 1577 in 2011, 2023 in 2012, and 741 up to mid July 2013. Most of such persons were then resettled elsewhere in Europe or North America. Around 45% of immigrants landed in Malta have been granted refugee (5%) or protected humanitarian status (40%). A White Paper suggesting the grant of Maltese citizenship to refugees resident in Malta for over ten years was issued in 2005.

Between 2008 and 2012 Malta received, on average, the highest number of asylum seekers compared to its national population: 21.7 applicants per 1,000 inhabitants. In 2011, most of these asylum applications were submitted by nationals of Somalia, Nigeria, Eritrea and Syria. In 2012, more than half of the requests were by Somalian nationals alone. During this period, Malta was criticized for its reception of asylum seekers, particularly those who were accommodated in open and closed reception centres (often referred to as "detention centers").

As a member of the European Union and of the Schengen agreement, Malta is bound by the Dublin Regulation to process all claims for asylum by those asylum seekers that enter EU territory for the first time in Malta.

Asylum applications in Malta

Decisions on asylum status in Malta (total number)

Decisions on asylum status in Malta (total positive outcome
Geneva Convention status, humanitarian status, subsidiary protection)

== Irregular migration ==
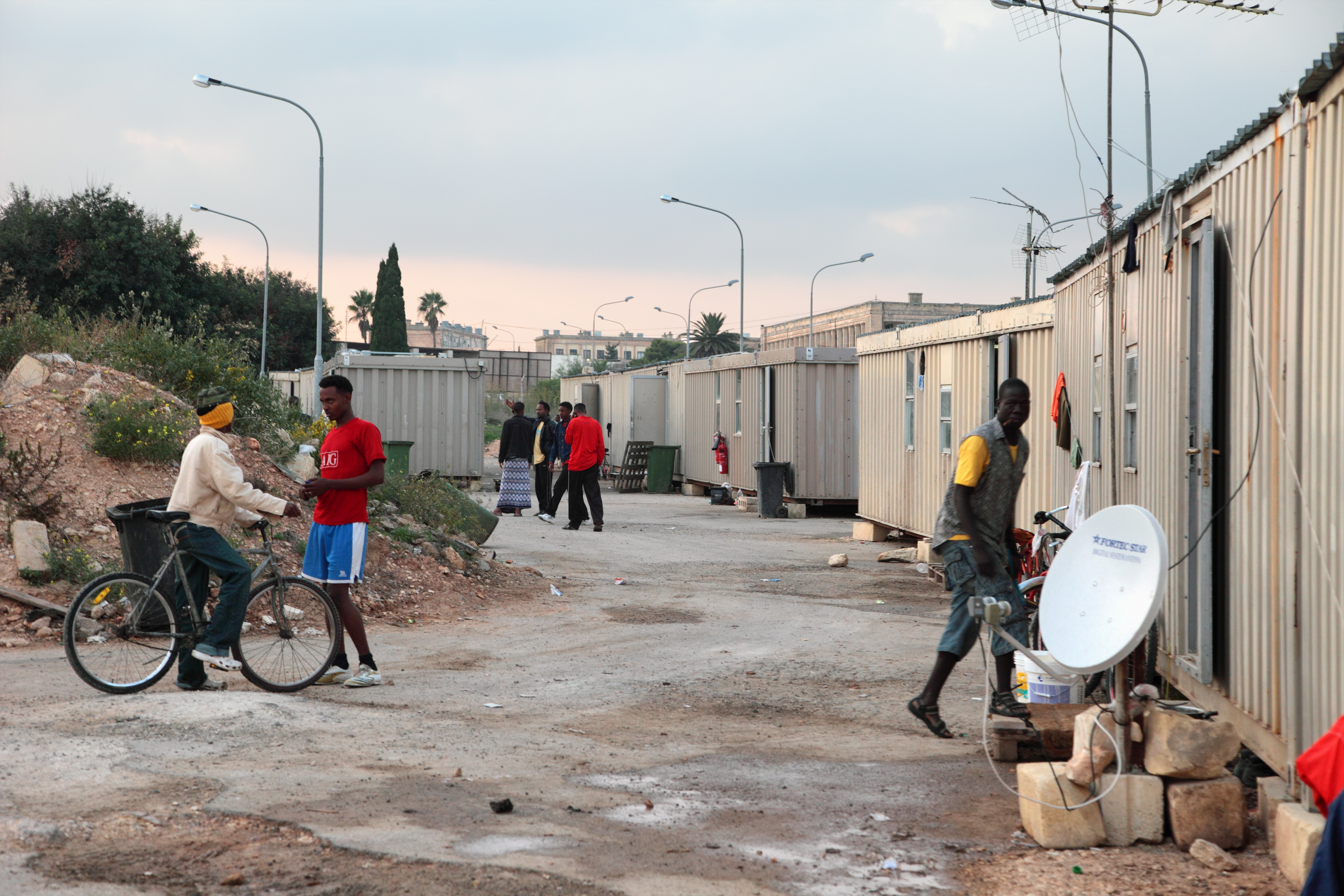
Immigrants at the Ħal Far refugee camp.

Since the late 20th century, Malta has become a transit country for migration routes from Africa towards Europe. The estimated net inflow (using data for 2002 to 2004) was of 1,913 persons yearly. Over the last 10 years, Malta accepted back a yearly average of 425 returning emigrants. During 2006, 1,800 irregular migrants reached Malta making the crossing from the North African coast. Most of them intended to reach mainland Europe and happened to come to Malta due to their sub-standard vessels breaking down or being caught by Maltese and other EU officials. In the first half of 2006, 967 irregular immigrants arrived in Malta – almost double the 473 who arrived in the same period in 2005. Many immigrants have perished in the journey across the Mediterranean, with one notable incident being the May 2007 Malta migrant boat disaster. Since that time, there have been several additional boat sinkings, and only as recently as April 2015, some 700 immigrants perished en route to Italy when their boat capsized. During 2014 alone, approximately 3,500 migrants drowned in their attempt to reach Europe.

Very few migrants arrived in Malta in 2015, despite the fact that the rest of Europe was experiencing an acute migrant crisis during that period. Most migrants who were rescued between Libya and Malta were taken to Italy, and some refused to be brought to Malta.

Malta has in the past considered adopting a push-back policy towards approaching migrants, pushing their boats back to Libya. Such a policy, contrary to international law and the principle of non-refoulement, has been condemned by the European Court of Human Rights in a case against Italy, as it does not allow prospective asylum seekers to file their claims for international protection.

Irregular migrants (formal Maltese: immigranti irregolari, informal: klandestini) who land in Malta are subject to a compulsory detention policy, being held in several camps organised by the Armed Forces of Malta (AFM), including those near Ħal Far and Ħal Safi. The compulsory detention policy has been denounced by several NGOs, and in July 2010, the European Court of Human Rights found that Malta's detention of migrants was arbitrary, lacking in adequate procedures to challenge detention, and in breach of its obligations under the European Convention on Human Rights. Detention costs for the first half of 2006 cost €746,385.

In 2005, Malta sought EU aid in relation to reception of irregular immigrants, repatriation of those denied refugee status, resettlement of refugees into EU countries and maritime security. In December 2005, the European Council adopted The Global Approach to Migration: Priority Actions focusing on Africa and the Mediterranean; but the deployment of said actions has been limited to the western Mediterranean, thus putting further pressure on the Central Mediterranean route for irregular immigration of which Malta forms a part.

On September 7, 2020, Amnesty International alleged that the Government of Malta used "illegal tactics" against immigrants for dealing with the arrival of refugees from the sea. Under these escalation of tactics Maltese authorities may have involved criminal acts being committed, resulting in avoidable deaths, prolonged arbitrary detention and illegal returns to war-torn Libya. The criticism came after an incident in July 2020 where Maltese authorities took 33 hours to mount a rescue mission after receiving a distress call from a dinghy carrying 95 migrants from Eritrea.

In the same year, the Malta-Libya migration deal was signed to coordinate operations against illegal migration. This lead in the following years to a steep decrease of rescues by the Maltese Armed Forces and an increase of illegal push-backs to Libya.

== Investment-based citizenship policy ==
In January 2014 Malta started granting citizenship for a €650,000 contribution plus investments, contingent on residence and criminal background requirements, under the Individual Investor Programme. Henley & Partners was originally appointed as sole agent for managing the policy, but the Maltese government later opened the scheme to Maltese firms too. The procedure is managed formally by the governmental agency Identity Malta.

The number and background of persons granted Maltese citizenship based on investment is unknown, as the Maltese government does not publish such data. Malta's Data Protection Commissioner confirmed that the publication of the number of passport buyers and their country of origin "may prejudice relations with a number of the countries of origin" and that revealing the agencies that handled their application "could reasonably be expected to prejudice commercial interests and, ultimately, the competitiveness of approved agents as it would reveal commercially-sensitive information".

The list of persons who were naturalised Maltese in the year 2015 includes over 900 names (listed by first name) without indication of previous/second citizenships and of reasons for naturalisation. This was criticised as not transparent enough. Many of the names are typical Arab, Russian, and Chinese names. Most "investors" are understood to be interested in acquiring Maltese citizenship only as a tool to exploit EU citizenship rights and reside elsewhere in the Union, including the UK. The European Parliament had objected to the programme as a sell-out of EU citizenship. In October 2024, EU Court of Justice's Advocate-General Opinion supported Malta's investor citizenship program and proposed that the court dismiss the case. However in May 2025, the court ruled against the program stating that it is contrary to the European law.

The income from Malta's passport sale amounted to €163.5 million in 2016. Of this, 70% is deposited in the National Development and Social Fund (NDSF), which was set up in July 2016 for general use by the government of Malta.

== Foreigners in Malta per locality ==
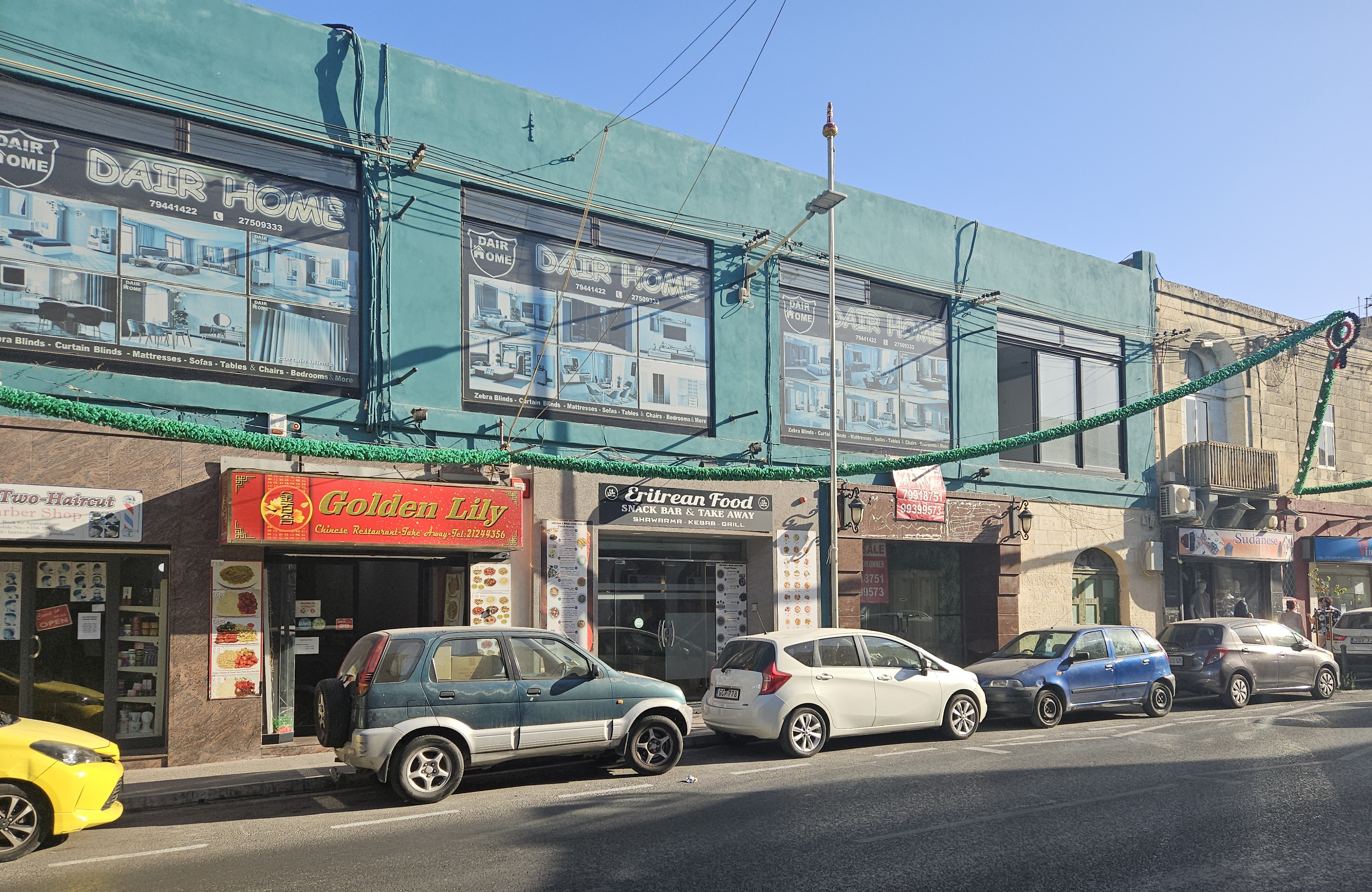
Ethnic food restaurants in Hamrun where a quarter of the population is of foreign origin

Immigration to Malta grew significantly from 2005 to 2011, though remaining marginal overall (from 3% to 5% of the total population). The impact of immigration was also geographically diversified. Urban centres in the Northern Harbour where immigrant presence was already relevant saw a growth (2,095 residents in Sliema, from 10% to 15%; Gzira from 6 to 10%) while other areas quickly turned into immigrant residence areas (1,172 residents in St Julian's, from 1% to 14.5%). The Southern Harbour area was less affected, though immigrant population also grew, particularly in Paola (from 1% to 4.8%), Vittoriosa (from 1.5% to 3.3%), Valletta (from 1.8% to 3.1%), Marsa (from 1.5% to 3%), and Floriana (from 1.8% to 3%). In the South, Birżebbuġa saw non-Maltese population swell from 3% to 19% (1,986 residents). In the north, St Paul's Bay remains the area with the highest absolute number of non-Maltese resident (3,023, or 18.5%).

The 2011-2021 decade saw the number of foreigners in Malta increase five times, from 20,289 to 115,449, i.e. from 4.9% to 22.2% of the total population of the islands. Almost half of the foreign population lives in the Northern Harbour area (52,420 persons), where in certain localities foreign residents now outnumber (Msida, Gżira) or almost equalise (Sliema, St. Julian's) Maltese citizens. In the north, St. Paul's Bay has doubled its population in a decade, becoming Malta's most populous locality with 32,042 residents, of which over half are foreign citizens.

In 2025, the net migration in Malta was 13,906 people indicating an increase in the resident population.

=== 2005 and 2011 censuses ===
	2005	%	foreigners	%	2011	%	foreigners	%
MALTA	404,962		12,112	2,99%	417,432		20,289	4.86%
Malta	373,955	92.34%	10,972	2.93%	386,057	92.48%	18,932	4.90%
Gozo and Comino	31,007	7.66%	1,140	3.68%	31,375	7.52%	1,357	4.33%
Southern Harbour	81,047	20.01%	827	1.02%	79,438	19.03%	1,542	1.94%
Cospicua	5,657	1.40%	67	1.18%	5,249	1.26%	91	1.73%
Fgura	11,258	2.78%	96	0.85%	11,449	2.74%	167	1.46%
Floriana	2,240	0.55%	40	1.79%	2,014	0.48%	62	3.08%
Ħal Luqa	6,072	1.50%	50	0.82%	5,911	1.42%	89	1.51%
Ħal Tarxien	7,597	1.88%	58	0.76%	8,380	2.01%	85	1.01%
Ħaż‐Żabbar	14,671	3.62%	77	0.52%	14,916	3.57%	101	0.68%
Kalkara	2,882	0.71%	20	0.69%	2,946	0.71%	51	1.73%
Marsa	5,344	1.32%	80	1.50%	4,788	1.15%	147	3.07%
Paola	8,822	2.18%	87	0.99%	8,267	1.98%	395	4.78%
Santa Luċija	3,186	0.79%	19	0.60%	2,970	0.71%	19	0.64%
Senglea	3,074	0.76%	55	1.79%	2,740	0.66%	52	1.90%
Valletta	6,300	1.56%	114	1.81%	5,748	1.38%	178	3.10%
Vittoriosa	2,701	0.67%	40	1.48%	2,489	0.60%	82	3.29%
Xgħajra	1,243	0.31%	24	1.93%	1,571	0.38%	23	1.46%
Northern Harbour	119,332	29.47%	4,996	4.19%	120,449	28.85%	7,768	6.45%
Birkirkara	21,858	5.40%	306	1.40%	21,749	5.21%	451	2.07%
Gżira	7,090	1.75%	404	5.70%	7,055	1.69%	756	10.72%
Ħal Qormi	16,559	4.09%	95	0.57%	16,394	3.93%	132	0.81%
Ħamrun	9,541	2.36%	109	1.14%	9,043	2.17%	184	2.03%
Msida	7,629	1.88%	401	5.26%	7,748	1.86%	737	9.51%
Pembroke	2,935	0.72%	52	1.77%	3,488	0.84%	142	4.07%
San Ġwann	12,737	3.15%	517	4.06%	12,152	2.91%	536	4.41%
Santa Venera	6,075	1.50%	735	12.10%	6,789	1.63%	142	2.09%
St Julian's	7,752	1.91%	71	0.92%	8,067	1.93%	1,172	14.53%
Swieqi	8,208	2.03%	702	8.55%	8,755	2.10%	995	11.36%
Ta' Xbiex	1,860	0.46%	116	6.24%	1,556	0.37%	113	7.26%
Tal‐Pietà	3,846	0.95%	150	3.90%	4,032	0.97%	313	7.76%
Tas‐Sliema	13,242	3.27%	1,338	10.10%	13,621	3.26%	2,095	15.38%
South Eastern	59,371	14.66%	1,042	1.76%	64,276	15.40%	3,130	4.87%
Birżebbuġa	8,564	2.11%	272	3.18%	10,412	2.49%	1,986	19.07%
Gudja	2,923	0.72%	19	0.65%	2,994	0.72%	24	0.80%
Ħal Għaxaq	4,405	1.09%	26	0.59%	4,577	1.10%	43	0.94%
Ħal Kirkop	2,185	0.54%	8	0.37%	2,283	0.55%	18	0.79%
Ħal Safi	1,979	0.49%	32	1.62%	2,074	0.50%	50	2.41%
Marsaskala	9,346	2.31%	445	4.76%	11,059	2.65%	672	6.08%
Marsaxlokk	3,222	0.80%	44	1.37%	3,366	0.81%	68	2.02%
Mqabba	3,021	0.75%	24	0.79%	3,223	0.77%	26	0.81%
Qrendi	2,535	0.63%	27	1.07%	2,667	0.64%	47	1.76%
Żejtun	11,410	2.82%	73	0.64%	11,334	2.72%	92	0.81%
Żurrieq	9,781	2.42%	72	0.74%	10,287	2.46%	104	1.01%
Western	57,038	14.08%	807	1.41%	58,129	13.93%	1,253	2.16%
Ħ'Attard	10,405	2.57%	157	1.51%	10,553	2.53%	217	2.06%
Ħad‐Dingli	3,347	0.83%	26	0.78%	3,511	0.84%	36	1.03%
Ħal Balzan	3,869	0.96%	94	2.43%	4,101	0.98%	286	6.97%
Ħal Lija	2,797	0.69%	69	2.47%	2,977	0.71%	105	3.53%
Ħaż‐Żebbuġ	11,292	2.79%	114	1.01%	11,580	2.77%	154	1.33%
Iklin	3,220	0.80%	43	1.34%	3,169	0.76%	63	1.99%
Mdina	278	0.07%	11	3.96%	239	0.06%	12	5.02%
Mtarfa	2,426	0.60%	30	1.24%	2,585	0.62%	28	1.08%
Rabat	11,473	2.83%	180	1.57%	11,212	2.69%	245	2.19%
Siġġiewi	7,931	1.96%	83	1.05%	8,202	1.96%	107	1.30%
Northern	57,167	14.12%	3,300	5.77%	63,765	15.28%	5,239	8.22%
Ħal Għargħur	2,352	0.58%	62	2.64%	2,605	0.62%	121	4.64%
Mellieħa	7,676	1.90%	621	8.09%	8,661	2.07%	946	10.92%
Mġarr	3,014	0.74%	50	1.66%	3,479	0.83%	97	2.79%
Mosta	18,735	4.63%	329	1.76%	19,750	4.73%	480	2.43%
Naxxar	11,978	2.96%	392	3.27%	12,875	3.08%	572	4.44%
St Paul's Bay	13,412	3.31%	1,846	13.76%	16,395	3.93%	3,023	18.44%
Gozo and Comino	31,007	7.66%	1,140	3.68%	31,375	7.52%	1,357	4.33%
Fontana	850	0.21%	16	1.88%	882	0.21%	14	1.59%
Għajnsielem	2,570	0.63%	93	3.62%	2,645	0.63%	112	4.23%
Għarb	1,146	0.28%	86	7.50%	1,196	0.29%	116	9.70%
Għasri	418	0.10%	30	7.18%	431	0.10%	40	9.28%
Munxar	1,052	0.26%	106	10.08%	1,068	0.26%	94	8.80%
Nadur	4,192	1.04%	126	3.01%	3,973	0.95%	112	2.82%
Qala	1,616	0.40%	78	4.83%	1,811	0.43%	130	7.18%
San Lawrenz	598	0.15%	28	4.68%	610	0.15%	39	6.39%
Ta' Kerċem	1,665	0.41%	50	3.00%	1,718	0.41%	65	3.78%
Ta' Sannat	1,725	0.43%	86	4.99%	1,837	0.44%	79	4.30%
Victoria	6,395	1.58%	102	1.59%	6,252	1.50%	163	2.61%
Xagħra	3,934	0.97%	193	4.91%	3,968	0.95%	212	5.34%
Xewkija	3,111	0.77%	30	0.96%	3,143	0.75%	56	1.78%
Żebbuġ	1,735	0.43%	116	6.69%	1,841	0.44%	125	6.79%

=== 2011 and 2021 censuses ===
Total population	2011			2021		
	Maltese	Non Maltese	Total	Maltese	Non Maltese	Total
MALTA	397,143	20,289	417,432	404,113	115,449	519,562
Malta	367,125	18,932	386,057	372,488	107,787	480,275
Gozo and Comino	30,018	1,357	31,375	31,625	7,662	39,287
Southern Harbour	77,896	1,542	79,438	75,098	10,911	86,009
Bormla	5,158	91	5,249	4,217	437	4,654
Floriana	1,952	62	2,014	1,638	347	1,985
Ħal Luqa	5,822	89	5,911	6,197	1,052	7,249
Ħal Tarxien	8,295	85	8,380	8,631	833	9,464
Ħaż-Żabbar	14,815	101	14,916	16,030	1,118	17,148
Il-Birgu	2,407	82	2,489	1,959	302	2,261
Il-Fgura	11,282	167	11,449	11,365	1,701	13,066
Il-Kalkara	2,895	51	2,946	2,793	312	3,105
Il-Marsa	4,641	147	4,788	4,035	1,433	5,468
Ix-Xgħajra	1,548	23	1,571	1,836	356	2,192
L-Isla	2,688	52	2,740	2,049	255	2,304
Raħal Ġdid	7,872	395	8,267	7,311	2,028	9,339
Santa Luċija	2,951	19	2,970	2,551	66	2,617
Valletta	5,570	178	5,748	4,486	671	5,157
Northern Harbour	112,681	7,768	120,449	104,877	52,420	157,297
Birkirkara	21,298	451	21,749	20,636	5,171	25,807
Ħal Qormi	16,262	132	16,394	15,963	2,136	18,099
Il-Gżira	6,299	756	7,055	4,930	5,401	10,331
Il-Ħamrun	8,859	184	9,043	7,970	2,544	10,514
Is-Swieqi	7,760	995	8,755	7,825	5,219	13,044
L-Imsida	7,011	737	7,748	6,094	7,493	13,587
Pembroke	3,346	142	3,488	3,096	449	3,545
San Ġiljan	6,895	1,172	8,067	5,899	5,754	11,653
San Ġwann	11,616	536	12,152	10,757	3,487	14,244
Santa Venera	6,647	142	6,789	7,094	1,740	8,834
Ta' Xbiex	1,443	113	1,556	1,323	769	2,092
Tal-Pieta'	3,719	313	4,032	3,240	2,652	5,892
Tas-Sliema	11,526	2,095	13,621	10,050	9,605	19,655
South Eastern	61,146	3,130	64,276	66,512	11,436	77,948
Birżebbuġa	8,426	1,986	10,412	8,419	3,425	11,844
Ħal Għaxaq	4,534	43	4,577	5,190	348	5,538
Ħal Kirkop	2,265	18	2,283	2,390	137	2,527
Ħal Safi	2,024	50	2,074	2,211	430	2,641
Il-Gudja	2,970	24	2,994	3,004	225	3,229
Il-Qrendi	2,620	47	2,667	2,955	193	3,148
Iż-Żejtun	11,242	92	11,334	11,772	637	12,409
Iż-Żurrieq	10,183	104	10,287	11,546	749	12,295
L-Imqabba	3,197	26	3,223	3,384	141	3,525
Marsaskala	10,387	672	11,059	12,157	4,647	16,804
Marsaxlokk	3,298	68	3,366	3,484	504	3,988
Western	56,876	1,253	58,129	59,527	5,739	65,266
Ħad-Dingli	3,475	36	3,511	3,765	100	3,865
Ħal Balzan	3,815	286	4,101	3,949	825	4,774
Ħal Lija	2,872	105	2,977	2,872	290	3,162
Ħ'Attard	10,336	217	10,553	10,885	1,383	12,268
Ħaż-Żebbuġ	11,426	154	11,580	12,521	1,264	13,785
Ir-Rabat	10,967	245	11,212	11,016	920	11,936
Is-Siġġiewi	8,095	107	8,202	8,846	472	9,318
L-Iklin	3,106	63	3,169	2,997	402	3,399
L-Imdina	227	12	239	161	32	193
L-Imtarfa	2,557	28	2,585	2,515	51	2,566
Northern	58,526	5,239	63,765	66,474	27,281	93,755
Ħal Għargħur	2,484	121	2,605	3,238	503	3,741
Il-Mellieħa	7,715	946	8,661	9,211	3,527	12,738
Il-Mosta	19,270	480	19,750	20,632	2,850	23,482
In-Naxxar	12,303	572	12,875	14,251	2,661	16,912
L-Imġarr	3,382	97	3,479	4,382	458	4,840
San Pawl Il-Baħar	13,372	3,023	16,395	14,760	17,282	32,042
Gozo and Comino	30,018	1,357	31,375	31,625	7,662	39,287
Għajnsielem and Comino	2,533	112	2,645	2,877	646	3,523
Il-Fontana	868	14	882	894	148	1,042
Il-Munxar	974	94	1,068	1,088	619	1,707
Il-Qala	1,681	130	1,811	1,864	436	2,300
In-Nadur	3,861	112	3,973	3,905	643	4,548
Ir-Rabat, Għawdex	6,089	163	6,252	5,839	1,403	7,242
Ix-Xagħra	3,756	212	3,968	4,251	910	5,161
Ix-Xewkija	3,087	56	3,143	3,064	491	3,555
Iż-Żebbuġ	1,716	125	1,841	1,932	1,371	3,303
L-Għarb	1,080	116	1,196	1,213	336	1,549
L-Għasri	391	40	431	424	94	518
San Lawrenz	571	39	610	625	147	772
Ta' Kerċem	1,653	65	1,718	1,704	177	1,881
Ta' Sannat	1,758	79	1,837	1,945	241	2,186

== Immigration process ==
Malta’s immigration policies are different for people of different identities, nationalities, and immigration purposes. There are companies that provide professional immigration services. You can click the link below to read more about immigration steps and precautions [external link].

Ref: Moving to Malta Step-by-step Immigration Guide

== Notable Maltese people of foreign descent ==
Armenian-Maltese

- Mikhail Basmadjian (actor)
- Andy Eminyan (retired footballer)

Australian-Maltese

- Kevin Moore
- Peter Pullicino
- Paul Fenech
- Mario Fenech

British-Maltese

- Glenn Bedingfield
- Rohan Delacombe
- Sam Magri
- Tiffany Pisani

Canadian-Maltese

- Ivan Woods

Danish-Maltese

- Bjorn Kristensen

French-Maltese

- Carlo Gimach

German-Maltese

- V. G. Braun-Dusemond
- Giuseppe Hyzler

Greek-Maltese

- Ioannis Papafis

Irish-Maltese

- Sean Sullivan

Italian-Maltese

- Giuseppe Calì
- Arnold Cassola
- Claudia Faniello
- Fabrizio Faniello
- Ugo Pasquale Mifsud
- Maria Adeodata Pisani
- Peter Pullicino
- Joseph Rizzo
- Davide Tucci

Jewish-Maltese

- Aaron Farrugia

Moroccan-Maltese

- Rachid Chouhal

Nigerian-Maltese

- Destiny Chukunyere
- Ndubisi Chukunyere
- Alfred Effiong
- Joseph Mbong
- Paul Mbong
- Chris Okoh

Palestinian-Maltese

- Carlo Gimach

Serbian-Maltese

- Daniel Bogdanović

Slovenian-Maltese

- Daniel Bogdanović

Spanish-Maltese

- Baldassare Cagliares

Swedish-Maltese

- Arvid Pardo

== Notable foreign citizens living and working in Malta ==
Albanians in Malta

- Gers Delia
- Entonjo Elezaj
- Kastriot Peqini

Argentinians in Malta

- Federico Falcone

Brazilians in Malta

- Fernando Lopes Alcântara
- Matheus Bissi
- Ronaille Calheira
- Douglas Cobo
- Gilmar da Silva
- Edison Luiz dos Santos
- Jorge Elias dos Santos
- Jorge Pereira da Silva
- Allan Kardeck
- Diogo Pinheiro
- Luís Rómulo de Castro
- Rômulo
- David da Silva
- Rodolfo Soares
- Márcio Teruel
- William da Silva Barbosa

British in Malta

- Tanya Blake
- Anthony Burgess
- Chris de Burgh
- Tony Dyson
- Scott Fenwick
- Francis Jeffers
- Harry Luke
- Mark Miller (footballer)
- Montell Moore
- Brian Mundee
- Viv Nicholson
- Malcolm Robertson (footballer)
- Brian Talbot
- Carl Tremarco

Cameroonians in Malta

- Abade Narcisse Fish
- Christian Pouga

Colombians in Malta

- Jhon Obregón

Congolese (D.R.C.) in Malta

- Yannick Bolasie
- N'Dayi Kalenga

Czechoslovaks in Malta

- Rudolf Krčil

Dutch in Malta

- Ton Caanen
- Sylvano Comvalius
- Jordi Cruyff
- Djamel Leeflang

Germans in Malta

- Sigfried Held

Irish in Malta

- Denis O'Brien

Italians in Malta

- Liana Burgess
- Nicola Cosentini
- Mario Fontanella
- Daniele Messina
- Fabrizio Miccoli
- Gianmarco Piccioni

Ivorians in Malta

- Lassana Cisse

Japanese in Malta

- Go Nagaoka

Lithuanians in Malta

- Džiugas Bartkus
- Tomas Radzinevičius

Nigerians in Malta

- Abubakar Bello-Osagie
- Olumuyiwa Aganun
- Murphy Akanji
- Benedict Akwuegbu
- Orosco Anonam
- Minabo Asechemie
- Ibrahim Babatunde
- Ndubisi Chukunyere
- Haruna Doda
- Alfred Effiong
- Augustine Eguavoen
- Udo Fortune
- Henry Isaac
- Godwin Mensha
- Chucks Nwoko
- Udo Nwoko
- Stanley Ohawuchi
- Gabriel Okechukwu
- Digger Okonkwo
- Onome Sodje
- Akanni-Sunday Wasiu
- Godwin Zaki

Poles in Malta

- Leszek Czarnecki

Romanians in Malta

- Lucian Dronca

Senegalese in Malta

- Demba Touré

Serbians in Malta

- Srđan Dimitrov
- Dejan Đorđević
- Anđelko Đuričić
- Saša Jovanović
- Predrag Jović
- Milorad Kosanović
- Miloš Lepović
- Zoran Levnaić
- Jovica Milijić
- Nemanja Milovanović
- Neško Milovanović
- Boris Pašanski
- Stevan Račić
- Marko Rajić
- Milanko Rašković
- Nemanja Stošković
- Milan Vignjević

Slovaks in Malta

- Dušan Fitzel

Trinidadians in Malta

- Tony Warner

Ukrainians in Malta

- Semen Datsenko
- Oleksandr Maksymov

== See also ==
- Demographics of Malta
- Emigration from Malta
- List of countries by immigrant population
- List of sovereign states and dependent territories by fertility rate
