= Chris Okoh =

Chris Okoh may refer to:

- Chris Okoh (boxer) (born 1969), British boxer
- Chris Okoh (footballer) (born 1976), Maltese footballer
