= Ħal Far =

Industrial estate in Malta

Coordinates: 35.815°N 14.510°E

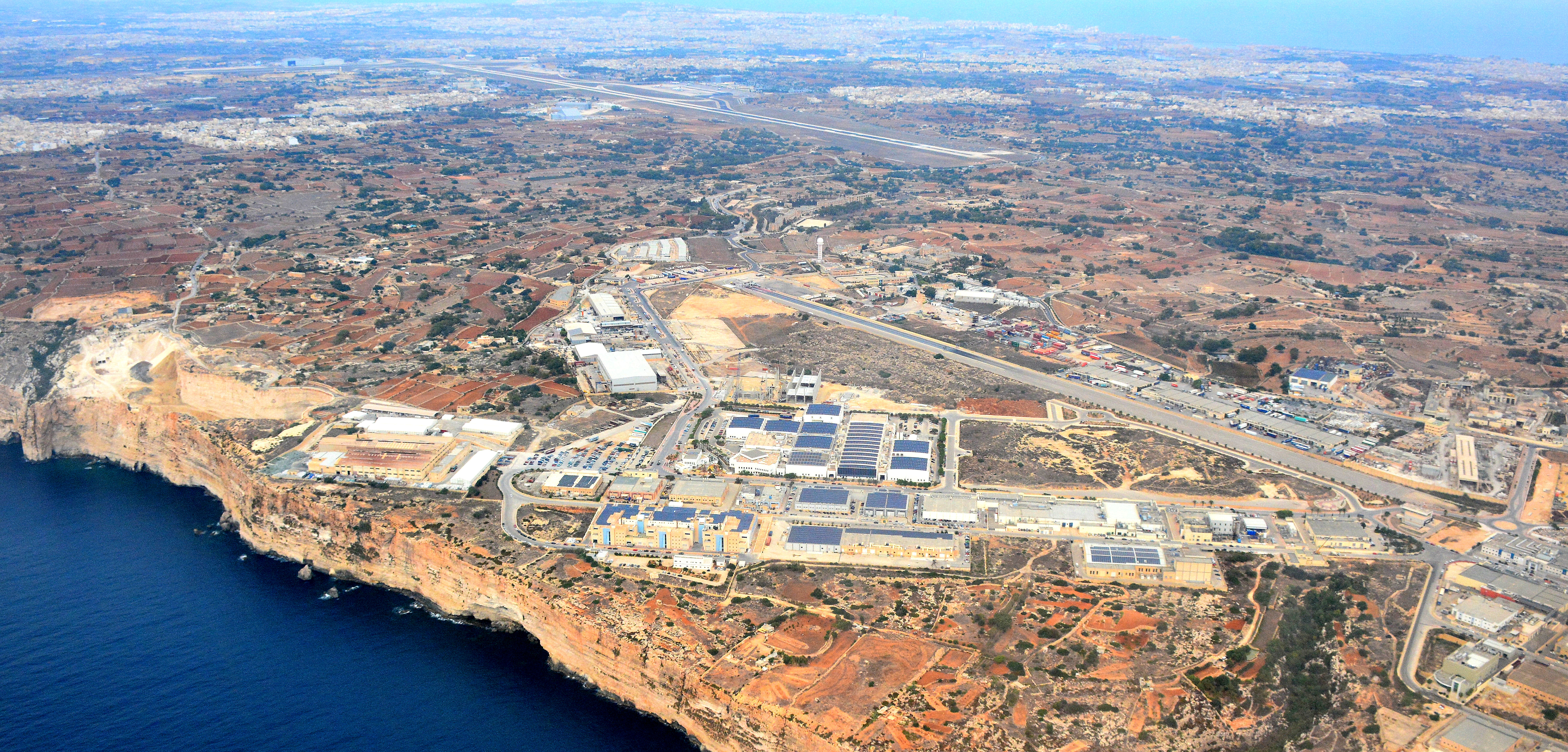
A bird's eye view of Ħal Far

Ħal Far is the largest industrial estate in Malta. It is at the southern extreme of Malta, between the localities of Birżebbuġa, Safi and Żurrieq.

== Name ==
The name of the village consists of two words: Ħal from Arabic origins and abbreviation of the word Rahal which means village, and Far from the Italian word Faro which means lighthouse.

Far probably originates from the Sicilian town of lo Faro which is today known as Torre Faro. Faro refers to a lighthouse in some romance languages.

Due to language confusion some sources provide the wrong interpretation that the name of the village derives from the Arabic word far meaning a rat and hence claiming Arabic origins. However this is likely incorrect.

== History ==
In the British period, Ħal Far housed the RAF Hal Far airfield, which was known as HMS Falcon when in the service of the Royal Navy. The airfield was also used in 1954 and 1955 by the US Navy Squadron VP-11 for a tour of six months each year. VP-11 had a complement of 12 aircraft stationed there. The enlisted personnel lived in Quonset huts located within walking distance of the airport.

The runway can still be seen and driven on, leaving Maltese drag racers to use it for drag car racing. Parts of the airfield including the hangar have been converted into detention centres for refugees and asylum seekers.

The area is also home to the historical Ħasan Cave, the Wardija Tower and the second largest Playmobil factory in the world.

The 2019 murder of Lassana Cisse was in Ħal Far.
