= India–Malta relations =

Malta–India relations
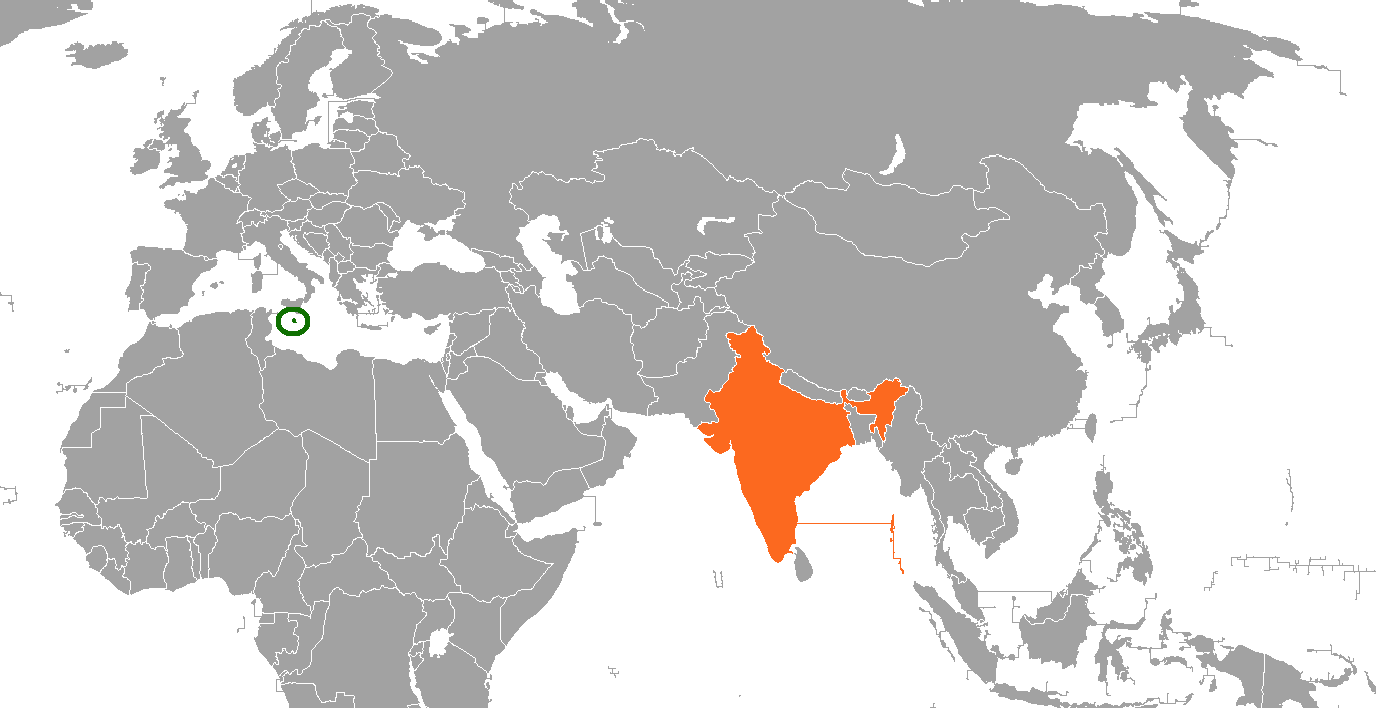
- Malta: India

Diplomatic mission
- High Commission of Malta, New Delhi: High Commission of India, Birkirkara

India–Malta relations are the bilateral relations between India and Malta. Malta opened its High Commission in New Delhi in 2007 [ as from 23 April 2026 it changed address to D15, Block D, Anand Niketan, 110021, New Delhi, Delhi ] and has consulates in Chennai, Mumbai and Kolkata.

In early 2018, India established its High Commission at Santa Venera in Malta.

Both countries are members of the Commonwealth of Nations.

== History ==
The political relations between Malta and India stretch back to before the two became independent nations. With the arrival of Britain to Malta in 1800 AD Maltese were taken to India by Britain. Many Maltese are buried in Indian graveyards. Maltese Catholic missionaries followed Maltese soldiers into India. In 1878, the British-controlled Indian government dispatched 7000 Indian troops to the island of Malta.

In 1924, Maltese Catholic missionaries established themselves among the remote Santhal tribes in Dumka, Jharkhand, India. Fr Anton Debono was the first Maltese Jesuit to travel to the area in 1924. Over 73 Maltese Catholic priests have lived in India since 1924. Dumka is located in the eastern state of Jharkhand, and is primarily home to the Santal people, an indigenous group of over 7 million. The Santals are India’s largest Scheduled Tribe, a designation identifying indigenous groups which are among the country’s most disadvantaged. Maltese are also present in the nearby village of Murguni During WWI Malta was used by the British for treating the wounded and for rehabilitating the injured. There are memorials at Pietà Military Cemetery to 28 Indians who fought for the British in World War I and died of wounds or illness in Malta. Entry to Pieta Military Cemetery is by Triq II-Principessa Melita. The bodies of 13 Indian soldiers and 7 men of the Indian Labour Corps, who died in Malta, were cremated at the Lazzaretto Cemetery on Manoel Island. Some of the Indians who died in Malta are Rifleman Dadrat Gurung, Havildar Jitbhadhur Thapa, Daffadar (Sergeant) Bal Ram, Driver Moti Lal, Driver Jai Ram and Labourer Khew Marak. Throughout World War II, the British used Malta as hub to bring Indian troops to and from the Atlantic. India was one of the first countries to recognize the independence of Malta in 1964. India established diplomatic relationship with Malta in 1965. In 2007 Malta opened a High Commission in New Delhi, India. In 2018 India reopened a High Commission at Triq Galanton Vassallo, St Venera in Malta. Formerly, a High Commission of India was opened in Malta in 1993 but was later closed in 2002.

According to a United Nations trade agreement, the two nations meet at least once annually to discuss economic, industrial, scientific and technological trade as well as other relationship issues. As part of the United Nations treaty both nations decided to establish stronger cultural ties and to honour each other's cultural heritage and promote cultural ties.

== Diasporas ==
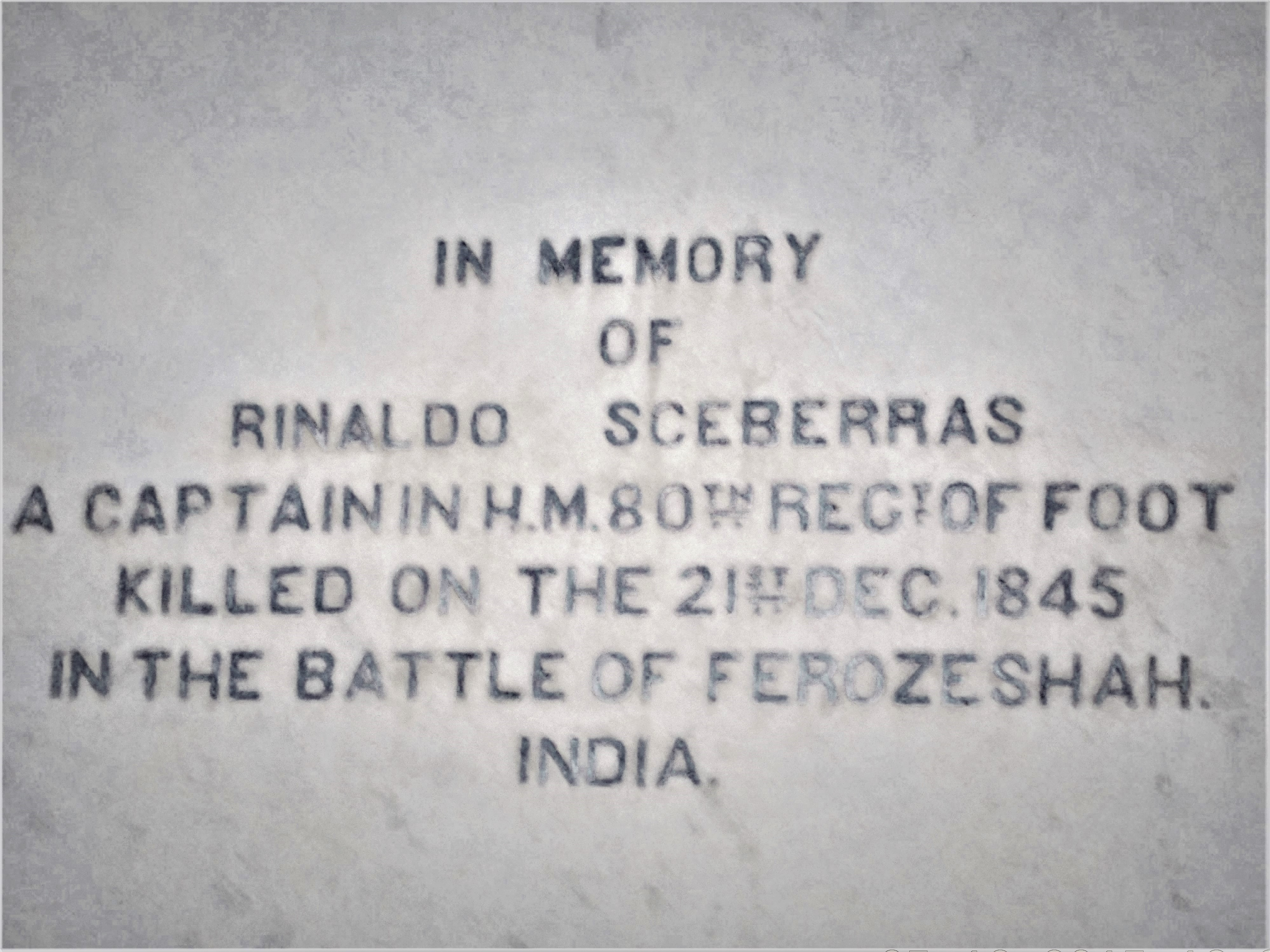
Plaque at the Upper Barrakka Gardens in the Maltese capital Valletta in memory of Rinaldo Sceberras, a Maltese captain who was killed in Battle of Ferozeshah, India, on 21 December 1845

A renowned Maltese lived and worked in India in the 16th century. That was around the period of Emperor Akbar's reign in India. India was the leading global economy at that time. Links of India with the nearby Roman Empire date back to before the rule of Emperor Augustus in Rome that is well recorded. With the start of British rule in Malta in 1800, Maltese went to India during the mass exodus out of Malta. A few Maltese in India fought alongside Britain against Indian freedom fighters and princely states. Maltese Catholic missionaries followed Maltese soldiers to India. In 1924, Maltese Catholic missionaries set themselves up among the Santhal tribes in Dumka in Jharkhand state of India for aim of spread of Catholicism and for conversions. Seventy-three Maltese priests have lived in India since 1924 and a few are still there. With the new strict visa rules coming into force in India, Maltese missionaries' entry into India is now restricted. There are several Maltese residents in India supported by the Maltese Consulate within the High Commission of Malta in New Delhi and honorary consulates in Mumbai, Chennai and Kolkata that provide consular service to them. Maltese firms like Malta Enterprises have a presence in India. In 2007, there were around 200 non-resident Indians living in Malta. The number of Maltese living in India is unknown.

Malta has a well-established small traders community of about 45 Sindhi Indian families, that traces its roots to migration of Sindhi traders starting around 1887 under British colonial rule of Malta. Malta did not attract people from any other part of India although Maltese have a continued presence in India since 1800. While both countries were under British rule, Malta served as a convenient trading node for exporting silk and curios from India and Far East to places around the Mediterranean and South America. Although India has a long history of trading in the region that dates back to before the rule of Roman Emperor Augustus in Rome. Trade between India and the Roman empire is well documented. However following India's independence, and due to strict immigration laws in Malta, not a single Indian is said to have emigrated to Malta between 1952 and 1985. However apart from the Sindhis no Indian from any other part of India showed any interest in Malta. During the doctors strike in Malta some years ago a few Indian doctors were recruited to run Malta's health services. All the Indian doctors recruited returned home. The traders of Indian descent in Malta belong to the Sindhi community and are locally known as l-Indjani ("the Indians"). The community maintains Indian traditions in Malta, such as privately organising celebrations of Diwali, Holi Onam and other Hindu festivals.

Hinduism In Malta Catholic Malta does not recognize Hinduism as a religion. Hinduism and religions of India origin are described as cults. There are no Hindu temples and the Hindu deceased are buried instead of being cremated which is very upsetting to the global Hindu community.

== Economic relations ==
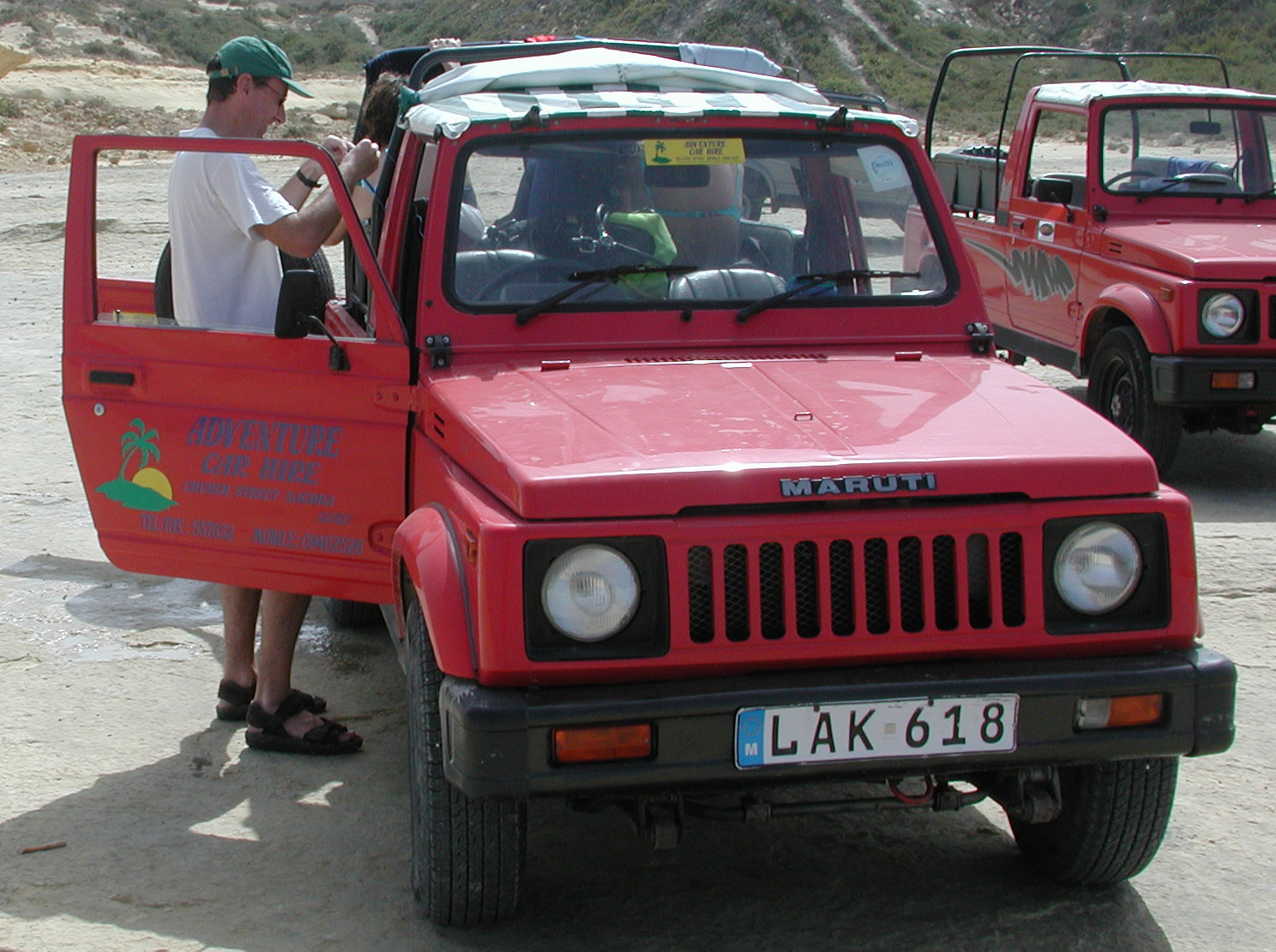
A pair of Indian Maruti Gypsy vehicles in Gozo, Malta.

Indian merchants have a long history of trading in the region. Trade that started under Persian Emperor Cyrus (600–530 BCE). The trade was initially by land before moving to sea. The Maltese government encourages Indian firms to set up business in Malta. In order to attract Indian businesses Malta has offered various incentives to Indian companies. Malta has also signed a bilateral trade agreement with the Indian government, for the avoidance of double taxation. Maltese and European Trade missions frequent India as India ranks fifth in Industrial out put and a global economy and after China, India is the world's second largest buyer's market. Estimated 112 Indian firms have invested between Euro 60 to Euro 100 million in Malta. In the lead among Indian firms investing in Malta are Aurobindo and Torrent Pharmaceuticals that together have estimated Euro 50 to Euro 60 million in Malta. Indian investment has created hundred of jobs for the local Maltese. In 2022 India exported goods worth Euro 251.63 million to Malta and India Imported items worth Euro 25.75 million in return.

== High level visits ==
Maltese Prime Minister George Borg Olivier visited India in November 1969, in what was the first visit by a Maltese prime minister after independence on 21 September 1964 and after the establishment of diplomatic relations between Malta and India on 10 March 1965.

Maltese Prime Minister Eddie Fenech Adami visited India in 1989. India and Malta later exchanged presidential visits: Indian President Ramaswamy Venkataraman visited Malta in 1990, and Maltese President Ċensu Tabone visited India in 1992. In March 2005, Maltese Foreign Minister Michael Frendo visited India for six days.

In November 2013, Maltese Foreign Minister George Vella met Salman Khurshid, on the side-lines of Asia–Europe Meeting meeting in New Delhi. In February 2015, Leo Brincat, Minister for Sustainable Development visited India to participate in the Delhi Sustainable Development Summit.

In January 2019, the prime minister of Malta, Joseph Muscat visited India where he met the prime minister of India, Narendra Modi at the Vibrant Gujarat Global Summit. During this visit, the two prime ministers had a meeting which was aimed at heightened Indian investment in Malta in the IT and pharmaceutical sectors.

In February 2023, Minister for the Economy, European Funds and Lands of Malta Hon Silvio Schembri visited New Delhi to attend the first Confederation of Indian Industries (CII) Europe and India Sustainability Conclave.

In the end of September 2023, the Permanent Secretary of the Ministry for Foreign Affairs and Trade of Malta, H.E. Christopher Cutajar visited New Delhi, India for the Foreign Office Consultations with the Ministry of External Affairs of India, which took place on 29 September 2023.

In October 2023, the Minister for Foreign & European Affairs and Trade, Hon Ian Borg visited New Delhi, India on a 2 day official visit. He had a bilateral meeting with his counterpart, the Minister for External Affairs of India, H.E. Subrahmanyam Jaishankar and with the Minister of State for External Affairs and Culture, H.E. Meenakshi Lekhi. During his visit to New Delhi, Minister Ian Borg also met with the Diplomatic and Local Staff of the High Commission of Malta in New Delhi, India, which was led by the High Commissioner ( Ambassador ) of Malta to India, H.E. Reuben Gauci from September 2020 till the beginning of August 2026.

In February 2024, the Permanent Secretary of the Ministry for Foreign and European Affairs and Trade of Malta, H.E. Christopher Cutajar again visited New Delhi to take part in the 9th Edition of the Raisina Dialogue and the 2nd Edition of the Confederation of Indian Industries ( CII) Europe and India Sustainability Conclave.

In 2025, marking the 60th anniversary of diplomatic relations between India and Malta, High Commissioner Reuben Gauci delivered lectures on India–Malta bilateral ties at institutions in Thiruvananthapuram, Kerala and Jaipur, Rajasthan. Gauci also visited the Kerala State Higher Education Council to discuss academic and research collaboration between Malta and Kerala's higher education institutions.

== Military Relations ==
Malta being strategically located in the middle of the Mediterranean Sea, between the continents of Africa and Europe, regularly hosts the international visiting ships calling on its ports for bilateral goodwill visits as well as for business and transshipment purposes. The Indian naval ships have similarly visited Malta few times in the recent past. This includes 3-day goodwill visit of Indian survey ship INS Darshak in April 2002. INS Tarangini visited Malta on 26 Feb- 1 March 2007; 20-22 June 2015, 6 Oct., 2015; and 20-23 May 2018.

Lieutenant Colonel Neil Hampton from the Armed Forces of Malta, held the European Union flag in the 77th Republic Day Parade of India on 26th January 2026. Lieutenant Colonel visited India as part of the European Union contingent who accompanied the President of the European Council Antonio Costa and the President of the European Commission Ursula von der Leyen during their visit as Chief Guests of the Indian Government.

== Diplomatic missions ==
Malta has a High Commission in Delhi. The High Commission was opened on 2007 and its offices were officially inaugurated on 7 January 2010 by the Former Deputy Prime Minister and Foreign Minister of Malta, Tonio Borg and the Former Minister of State in the Ministry of External Affairs of India, Preneet Kaur. Malta also has Consulates in Mumbai, Chennai and Kolkata.

India had a High Commission in Malta from 1992 to 2002. The Indian High Commission was re-opened in year 2018 in Santa Venera. India also has a consulate in Santa Venera.

== See also ==
- Foreign relations of Malta
- Foreign relations of India
- India and the Non-Aligned Movement
- Malta and the Non-Aligned Movement
- Hinduism in Malta

== Bibliography ==
- Mark-Anthony Falzon, Origins and establishment of the Indian Business Community in Malta, Bank of Valletta Review, No. 24, Autumn 2001
