= Indian Maltese =

Total population
- 6,972 (2021)

Languages
- English · Maltese · Languages of India

Religion
- Hinduism (50.42%), Christianity (40.53%), others (9.05%)

Related ethnic groups
- Sindhi diaspora

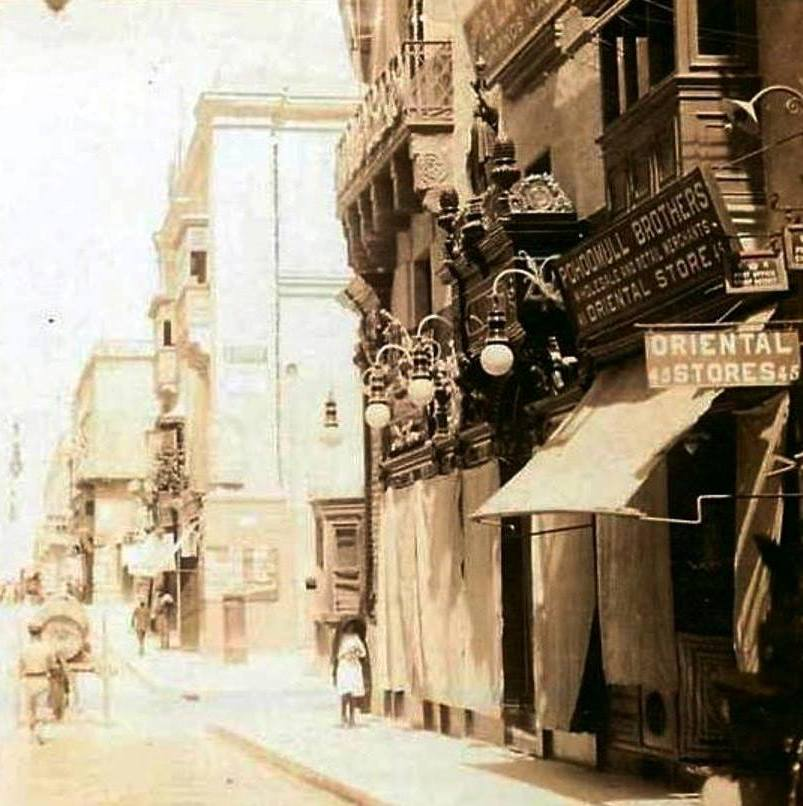
Kingsway, Valletta, during the 1910s. The Pohoomull Brothers' store, founded in 1887, was the predecessor of other Indian Maltese businesses.

The Indian community in Malta (Maltese: Il-Komunità Indjana f’Malta), which consists of around 7,000 people in 2023, is just under 0.5 percent of the population of Malta. Some families have been living in Malta since the country was a Crown colony.

Malta has a small, established Sindhi trading community of about 45 families (200 people) of shop-keepers from Hyderabad, Sindh (in present-day Pakistan) rooted in a migration which began around 1887, when Malta and India were under British colonial rule. Malta was a stop along a trade route for the export of silk; Indian-made hand-loom clothing was sought after in Europe for several centuries. After the partition of India and due to Maltese immigration laws, Indian immigration to Malta was halted from 1952 to 1985.

Since the 1990s, a wave of immigration from India to Malta has brought a community from Kerala. Indians in Malta work primarily in the health and hospitality sectors, and almost half are from Kerala. Since 2017, Kerala Indians in Malta have celebrated the annual Onam festival.

== History of the Sindhi community ==
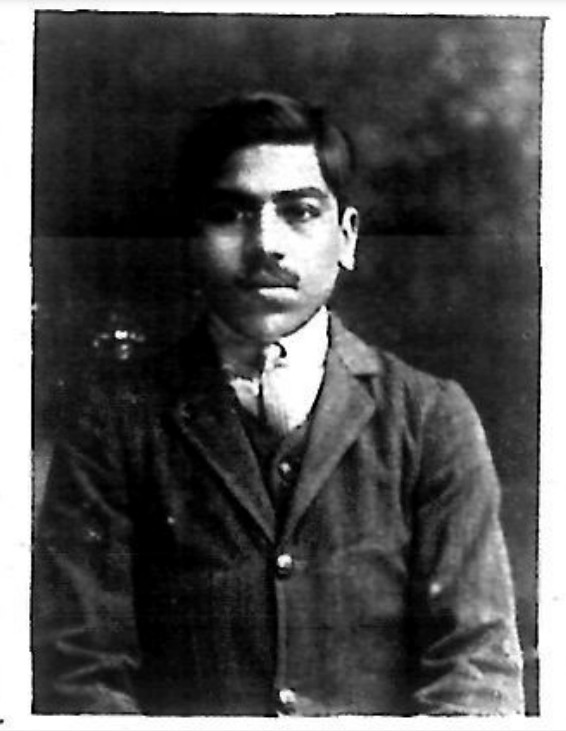
Thanvardas Vaswani, born 1896 in Sindh, was living in Malta by 1916, when he applied for a British passport to travel to Italy

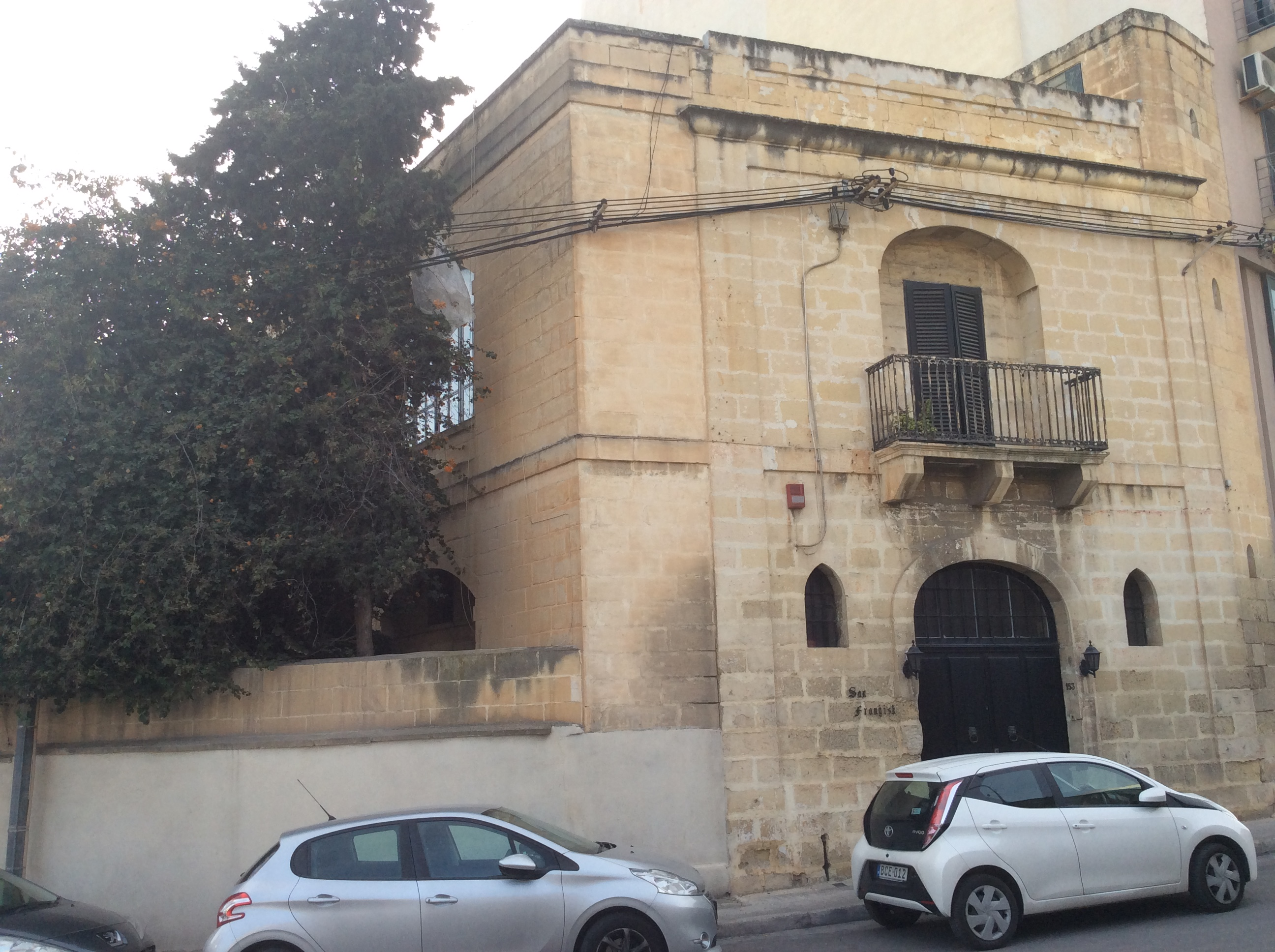
Dar Franġisk, a 19th-century building in Swatar, was used by British Indian troops as a military mess. Historic Indian graffiti were depicted on the walls.

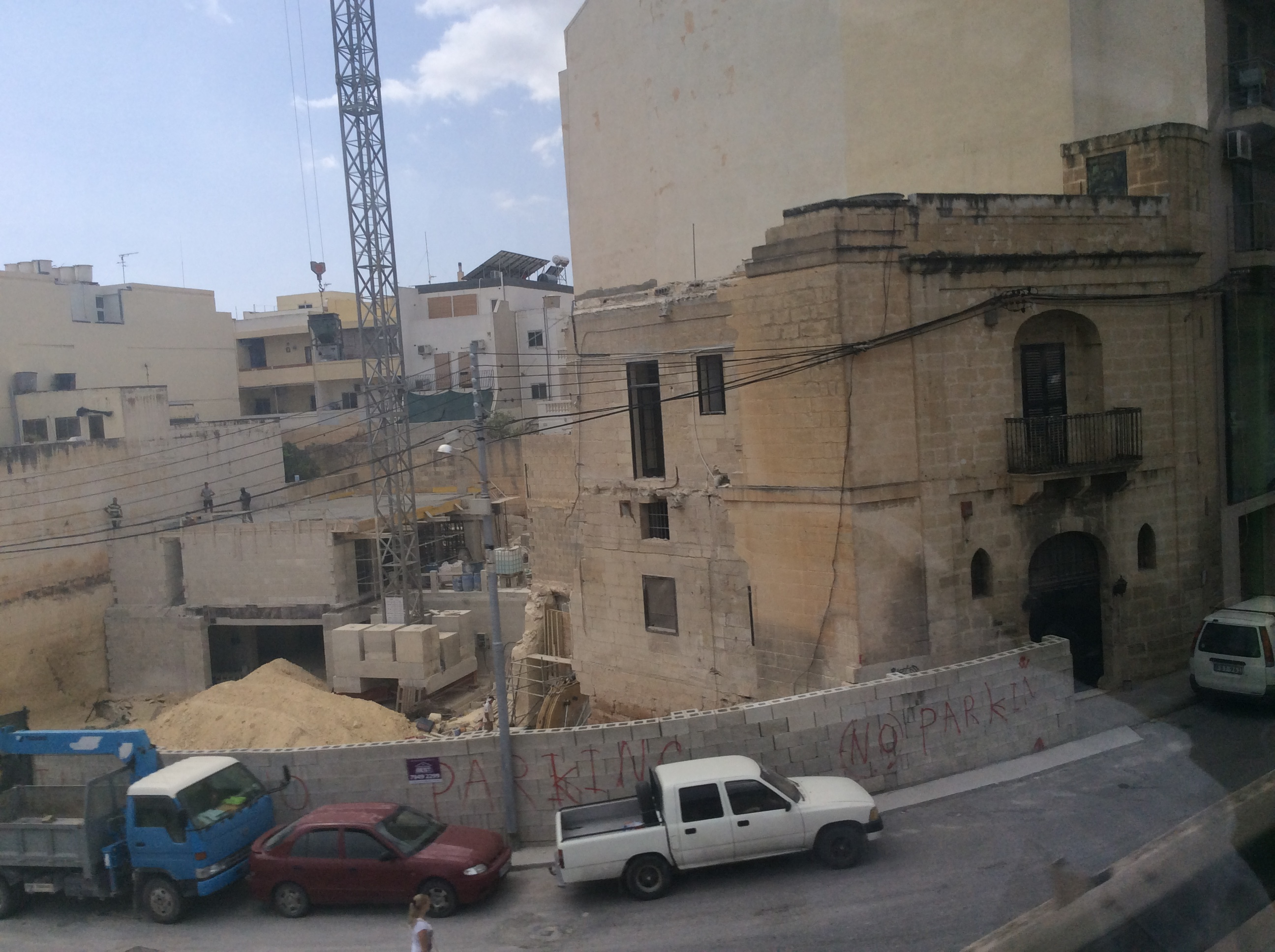
It was converted into a residence before being sold for development. Its walled garden and an extension of the building were destroyed to build apartments in the 21st century.

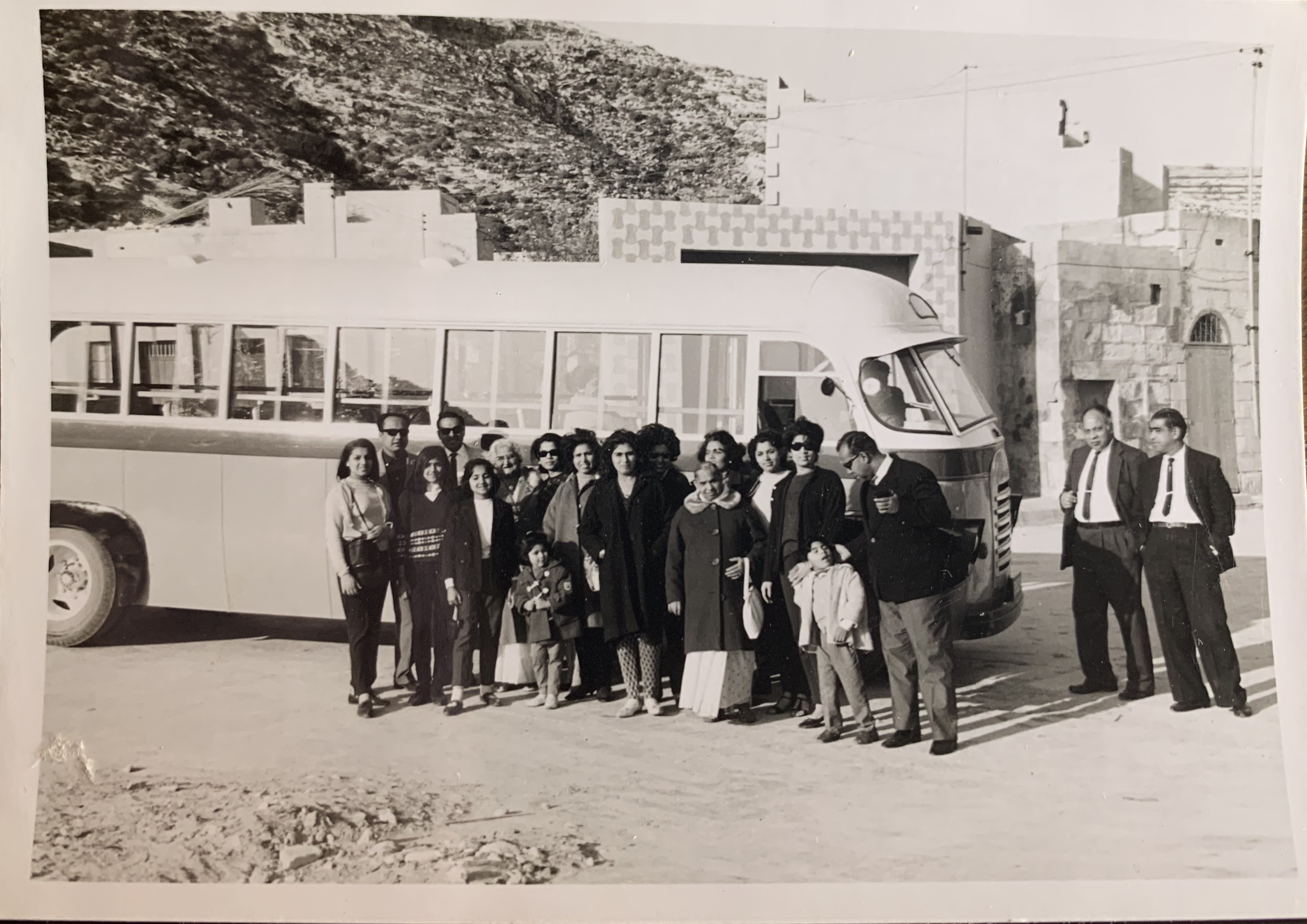
Sindhi community in Malta.

The historic Indian Maltese community derives from the bahiband jati of the Hindu Sindhi community. After the British annexation of Sindh in 1843, a group of entrepreneurs from Hyderabad sought opportunity throughout the British Empire. Originally trading in handicrafts from Sindh, they became known as Sindhi workies and established a trade diaspora facilitated by the Suez Canal and telegraph and railway lines. During the 1860s, traders from Hyderabad established businesses in Japan, Ceylon, the Gold Coast, Gibraltar and Hong Kong.

The Sindhi trade diaspora capitalized on increasing tourism from Britain and northern Europe in the Mediterranean as a profitable market for Sindhi handicrafts. It later diversified into silk and curiosities, adding products from the Far East such as Japanese ceramics and kimonos. The diaspora contributed to the growth of Gozo's Maltese lace industry, exporting lace as far as Java and South Africa.

In 1887 the Pohoomull Brothers firm applied to establish a shop in British-ruled Malta. By 1910, Malta had more than 10 Sindhi firms. They had shops in Valletta's central shopping thoroughfare (Strada Reale, later Kingsway and present-day Republic Street) for the high-end market, as well as branch stores and itinerant peddlers.

"From the time a ship dropped anchor to the time it left Malta, the visitor was tempted constantly by the Sindworkis' wares". Maltese shops were local branches of a central firm in Hyderabad, from which personnel was selected (usually linked by kinship) and sent to Malta for several years. Sindhi workies as young as 15 years old shared company-provided housing in Valletta or Floriana, and men could not bring their spouses or other dependents. Working time was extended up to 15 hours a day, with no weekends, and workers were treated as personal servants by shop managers. Firms expected total loyalty from their employees, and socialisation was not encouraged.

During the 1930s Great Depression, the tourist market subsided and many Sindh shopkeepers reduced their investments in Malta. The shops were sold to former employees, ready to operate at smaller profits, and became family-owned. The partition of India did not lead to an influx of Sindhis; Malta was considered too small to offer opportunities, and strict immigration rules between 1952 and 1985 period meant that only men newly wed to Maltese Indian girls could move to Malta. Sindhi businesses diversified their product lines to cater to domestic consumption in the import, wholesale and retail of textiles.

=== After the Second World War ===
After the Second World War, the Sindhis were ready to profit from newly-affluent British-ruled Maltese society and monopolise the textile trade. With the growth of the female workforce in Malta since the 1970s, Sindhi traders introduced ready-made clothing to cater to the lower- and middle-price market. Thanks to their trade network, they became wholesalers of cloth and textiles for Maltese retailers. The few firms which still traded curiosities opened during the 1980s to cheap electronics and adapted to the 1970s and 1980s influx of tourists in Malta, moving into the souvenir market on Valletta's main street. Further diversification and integration of Sindhi businesses in the Maltese economy was reported at the end of the 20th century.Maltese Trade missions frequent India as India ranks fifth in Industrial output and as a global economy today. Added India is the world's second biggest buyer's market. About 112 Indian firms have invested between $60 and £100 million in Malta. In the lead among Indian firms are Aurobindo and Torrent Pharmaceuticals that together have an estimated $50 to £60 million worth in Malta. That has created hundreds of jobs for the local Maltese. In year 2022 India exported goods worth Euro 251.63 million to Malta and India Imported items worth Euro 25.75 million in return.

== Associations and religion ==
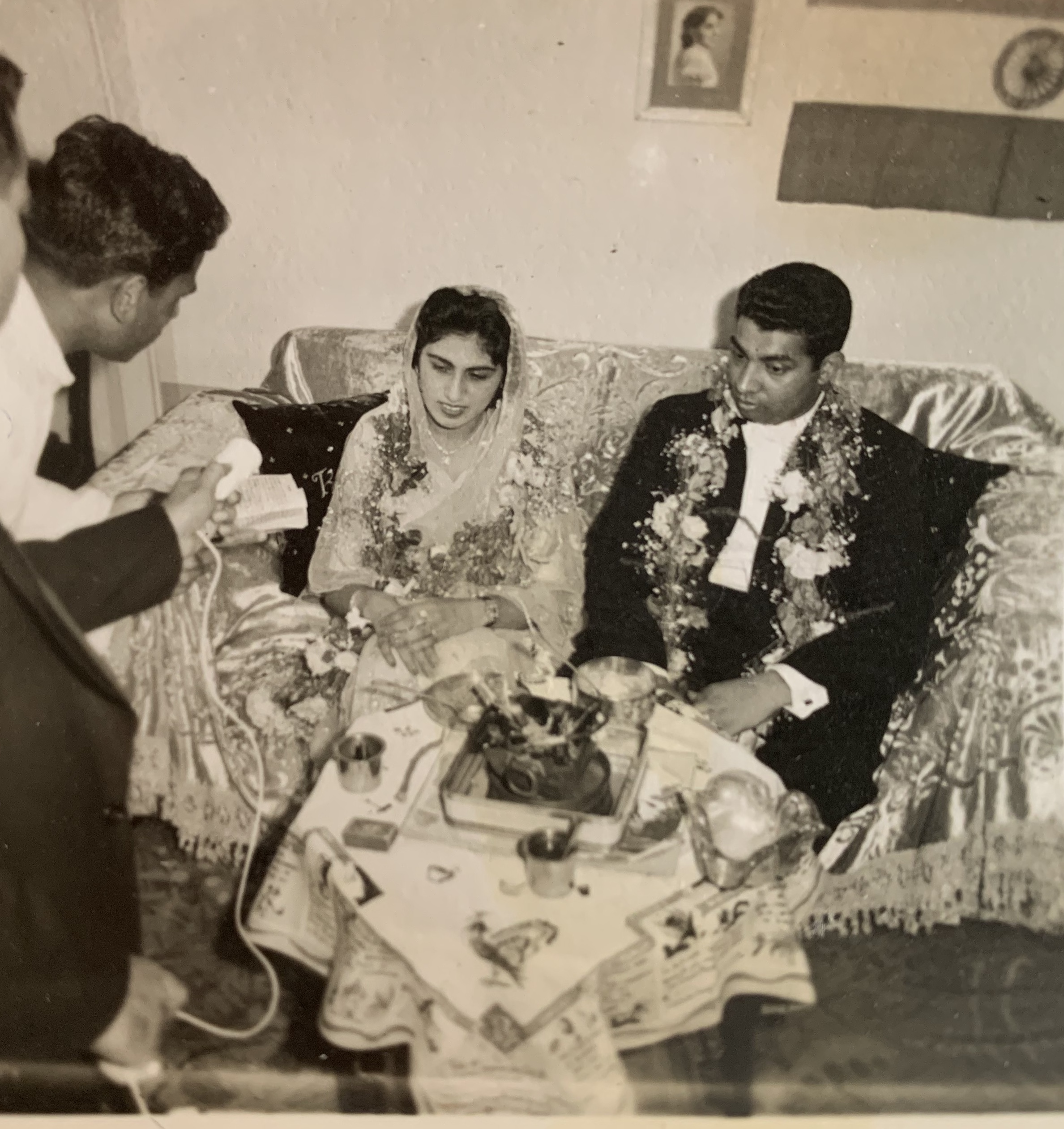
Sindhi wedding in Malta in 1958

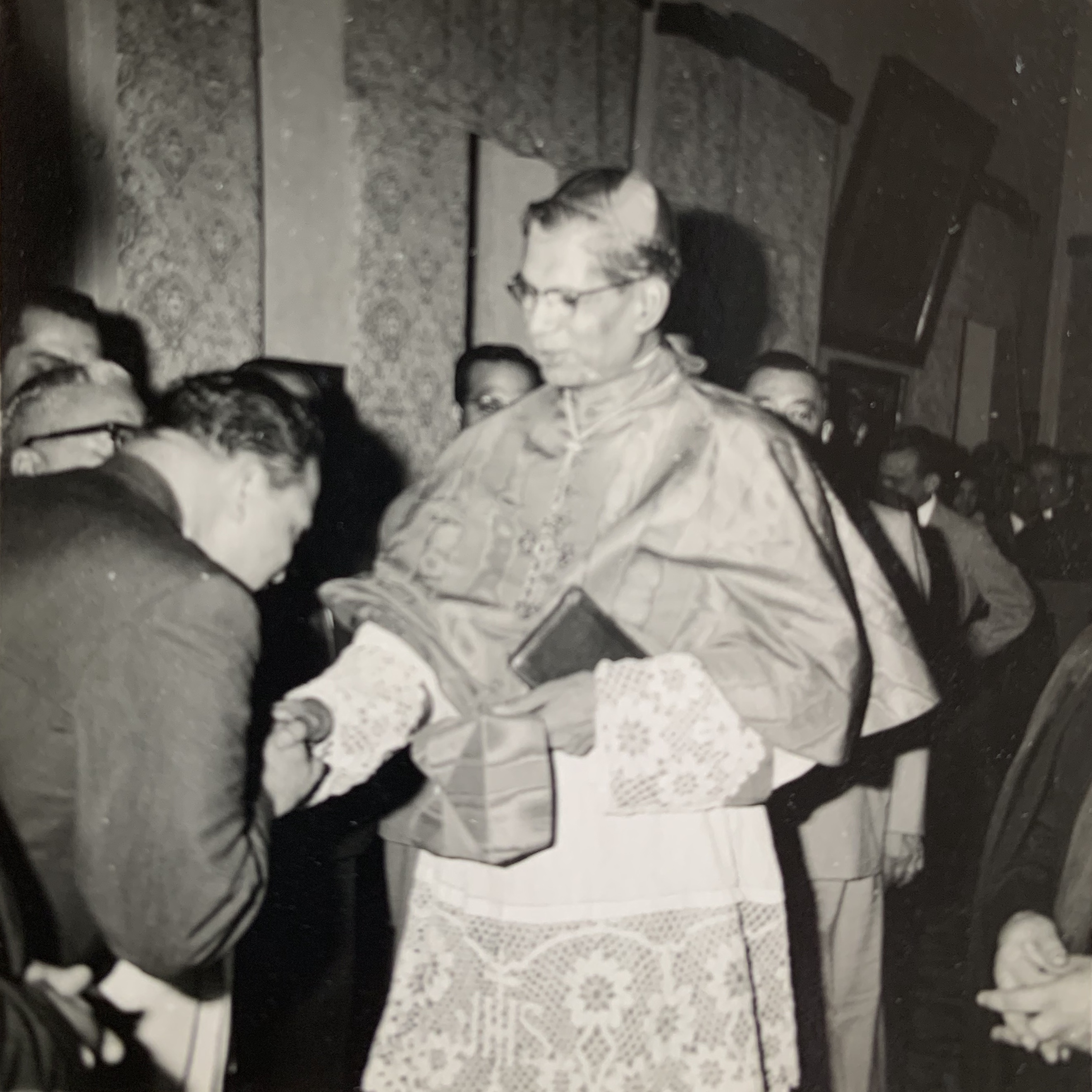
Cardinal Valerian Gracias of India, greeted by members of the Maltese Indian community at the La Valette Band Club

Sindhi traders in Malta formed the Indian Merchants' Association (Malta) in 1955, since the links to Hyderabad had been severed with the Indian partition. The association, never very active, was renamed the Maltese-Indian Community in 1989; this marked a shift towards self-perception as a local ethnic-cultural group.

The community continues to maintain Indian traditions in Malta, such as organising celebrations of Diwali, Holi, Onam and other Hindu festivals. Hinduism and other religions of Indian origin (Buddhism, Sikhism and Jainism) are not officially recognized and are described as "cults" in Malta.

== Memorials ==
Ta' Braxia Cemetery has a memorial commemorating twenty-eight Indians who fought on behalf of the British in World War I and died of injuries or disease in Malta. The bodies of 13 British-Indian soldiers and seven men from the Labour Corps were cremated at the Lazzaretto Cemetery on Manoel Island.

Deceased Hindus, Buddhists, Sikhs and Jains are forced to be buried under Catholic funeral rites instead of being cremated because of lack of crematoria in Malta. Cremation was legalized in Malta in 2019.

== See also ==
- India–Malta relations
- Immigration to Malta
- Hinduism in Malta

== Bibliography ==
- Falzon, Mark-Anthony (Autumn 2001). "Origins and establishment of the Indian business community in Malta". Bank of Valletta Review. 24. CiteSeerX 10.1.1.198.2937.

== Links ==
- Multicultural Malta, Times of Malta
- , AhbarjietMalta - Malta News in Hindi
