= Hinduism in Malta =

Hinduism is the third largest religion in Malta after Christianity and Islam. However, it is not recognized as a formal religion. As of the 2021 census, there are 6,411 Hindus in Malta that constituted 1.42% of its population.

In 2021, Charles J. Muscat wrote Ekam Sat: Il-Verità Waħda: Esperjenza tal-Veda Dharma Ġabra ta' testi ewlenin u riflessjonijiet prattići, an anthology of South Asian religious texts in Maltese including the Vedas and Upanishads.

== Demographics ==
In 2010, there were about 840 Hindus in Malta. According to the 2021 Census, there are 6,411 Hindus in Malta of which 135 are Maltese Citizens and 6,276 Hindus are non-Maltese residents. Hindus form 0.04% of the Maltese Citizens and 6.02% of the non-Maltese residents. Hinduism is practiced mainly by the Indian Maltese and Nepalese Maltese people.

=== District-wise Hindu Population ===
The District wise Hindu Population of Malta is shown below:

District	Percentage of Hindus(%)	Population of Hindus	Total Population
South Harbour District	1.11	749	67,175
Northern Harbour District	3.06	3224	1,05,309
South Eastern District	0.68	395	58,448
Western District	0.5	259	51,695
Northern District	2.53	1557	61,547
Gozo and Comino District	0.78	227	29,130

Northern Harbour District has the highest percentage of Hindus and Western District has the lowest percentage of Hindus.

=== Ethnicity ===
Ethnicity
Ethnicity	Percent
Asian	89.8%
Caucasian	4.5%
Hispanic/Latino	2.6%
African	1.7%
Arab	0.8%
Biracial	0.7%

Majority of the Hindus in Malta is of Asian origin, mainly Indian and Nepalese Hindus. There are 286 Caucasian Hindus, 164 Hispanic/Latino Hindus, 107 African and 51 Arab Hindus.

== Community life ==
A first floor flat is used as a temporary Hindu meeting point that is known as the Maltese-Indian Community Centre.

Hindus in Malta privately celebrate Diwali, Holi, Onam, and other Hindu festivals.

== Cremation controversy ==
Deceased Hindu were buried using Catholic burial rites after the British left in 1964, rather than being cremated as required by their religion. Under British rule of Malta, cremation took place at the Lazaretto cemetery in Manoel Island. One Hindu leader in the United States, Rajan Zed, implored the Maltese government in 2019 to subsidize cremations abroad for Hindus in Malta.

== Status ==
Hinduism, along with other Indian religions (like Buddhism, Sikhism and Jainism) and Judaism are not recognized in Malta and are treated as cults. In 2010, Hindu and Jewish groups urged Pope Benedict XVI to intervene to ensure that Malta treats all religions equally before the law.

== See also ==
- Hinduism in Finland
- Hinduism in France
- Hinduism in the United Kingdom
