= Minabo Asechemie =

Nigerian footballer (born 1980)

Personal information
- Full name: Minabo Asechemie
- Date of birth: 5 May 1980 (age 46)
- Place of birth: Okrika, Rivers, Nigeria
- Position: Midfielder

Senior career*
Years	Team	Apps	(Gls)
2001	Sharks	?	(?)
2001–2003	Marsa	24	(6)
2003–2005	Marsaxlokk	24	(3)
2006	Clevedon Town	1	(0)

International career
2002–2004	Nigeria	2	(0)
- * Club domestic league appearances and goals

Minabo Asechemie (born 5 May 1980) is a Nigerian former professional footballer who has played as a midfielder in Nigeria, Malta and England.

== Playing career ==
=== Sharks ===
Asechemie began his career in his native Nigeria playing for Sharks he enjoyed one season with the club, but was soon on the move, joining Maltese newly promoted team Marsa for the 2001–2002 season.

=== Marsa ===
Asechemie became an instant hit in his first season with Marsa after some impressive performances had helped save the club from relegation in their first season in the top flight for a very long time.

His second season in Maltese football saw a prove himself to be without doubt one of the best players in the Maltese League, rumours began to circulate that there was interest from Italian third division club Frosinone in the summer of 2002, but nothing materialised.

Asechemie had become hot property by the 2003–2004 season and had gained a call up to the Nigerian national team and earned two caps for his home nation. Despite his best efforts with Marsa, they were eventually relegated.

With the Nigerian's profile rising, and seemingly too good to play in the Maltese League, it seemed inevitable that he would leave Malta, he spent the summer of that season on trial for various clubs across Europe in hope of a move to a big club.

He was a trialist with Polish top side Wisła Kraków, Viborg FF of Denmark and Bristol City in England. Was on the verge of signing for Maltese First Division side Marsaxlokk, and Polish Second Division Side MKS Cracovia but eventually he went back to Marsa in Malta in order to start the new season with the relegated club.

=== Marsaxlokk ===
Rumours continued and the name of Asechemie was linked with many clubs, but weeks before the new season in Malta was about to begin Marsaxlokk signed Asechemie.

Unfortunately for both Marsaxlokk and Asechemie, the Nigerian had not lived up to the billing and after just two season Marsaxlokk released the player.

Managers and coaches were still aware of what Asechemie had achieved in Malta with Marsa and he wasn't short of trials to find a new club. In January 2005 he was on trial with Scottish club Dunfermline Athletic but failed to make the grade.

Asechemie's situation got worse and after other failed trials his fitness and lack of first team football began to show, in 2005-2006 he was also the subject of failed trials with Welsh side Swansea City, and English side Bristol Rovers and even Conference side Forest Green Rovers.

=== Clevedon Town ===
In 2006, Asechemie (once one of the hottest prospects in Nigerian football) finally found a club in the form of newly promoted Southern League Premier Division side Clevedon Town. Despite Asechemie's profile he often only made the bench for his new side, and after less than one season with just one league appearance to show, Asechemie left the club and subsequently went back to the drawing board.
