= Murder of Lassana Cisse =

Shooting in Malta

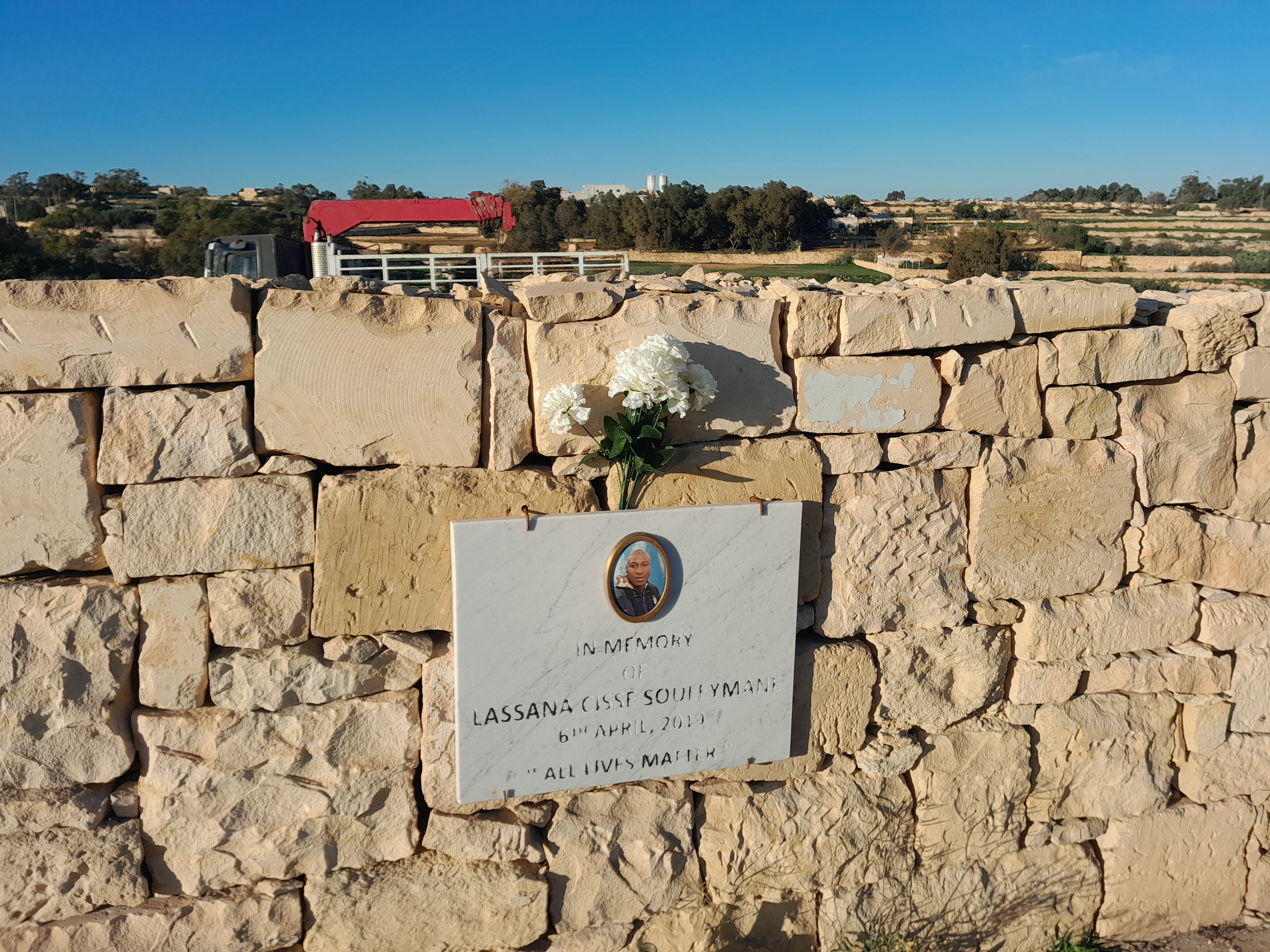
- Date: 6 April 2019
- Time: c. 23:00
- Location: Ħal Far, Malta
- Type: Drive-by shooting
- Motive: Racially motivated
- Casualties: Lassana Cisse (killed); Ibrahim Bah (injured); Mohammed Jallow (injured)
- Inquiries: Yes (Army of Malta)
- Inquest: Yes (Criminal Court of Malta)
- Arrests: Yes (2)
- Suspects: Francesco Fenech; Lorin Scicluna
- Accused: Yes (2)
- Convicted: No
- Charges: Yes (criminal)
- Trial: Finished (Scicluna); pending (Fenech)
- Verdict: Not Guilty (Scicluna)
- Convictions: No
- Sentence: No

On 6 April 2019, Lassana Cisse Souleymane, a 42-year-old migrant worker from the Ivory Coast, was killed in a racially motivated drive-by shooting in Ħal Far, Malta. Two other African migrants were also injured in the attack. In May 2019, the Armed Forces of Malta soldiers Francesco Fenech and Lorin Scicluna were charged with the murder of Cisse and attempted murder of the two others, along with the attempted murder of another migrant in a hit and run attack the previous February. Scicluna was acquitted of the murder in November 2026. Fenech is yet to stand trial.

== Background ==
Lassana Cisse Souleymane (sometimes spelt Lassane) was a migrant from the Ivory Coast who worked in Malta. He was a father of three children, and at the time of his death he was 42 years old. He helped other African migrants upon their arrival in Malta, and he was described as a Good Samaritan by his friends.

On 1 February 2019, Chadian migrant May Malimi was hit by a car while walking along Triq tal-Ġebel, a country lane which connects the town of Birżebbuġa to the migrant open centre at Ħal Far. He was left unconscious and was later taken to hospital where he recovered. It was later revealed that this was a deliberate racially motivated hit and run attack, and the suspected perpetrators of the Cisse murder were also charged with this attempted murder.

== Murder ==
On 6 April 2019, Cisse and two other migrants, Ibrahim Bah and Mohammed Jallow, (Note: There are conflicting sources regarding the ages and nationalities of Ibrahim Bah and Mohammed Jallow. Bah is said to have been 27 years old, and his nationality has been reported as being Guinea or the Gambia. Jallow is said to have been 28 years old, and his nationality has been reported as being the Gambia. One source incorrectly and inconsistently also claimed that both men were from Ghana, and that Bah was a 22-year-old.) went to Birżebbuġa to watch a football match between FC Barcelona and Atlético Madrid. They later began to walk along Triq tal-Ġebel on their way back to the Ħal Far open centre, when at around 23:00 shots were fired at the three men from a car which is believed to have been a white Toyota Starlet. Cisse was killed while the two other men were injured.

Police were called soon after the murder took place, and they called an ambulance after arriving on site.

== Aftermath ==
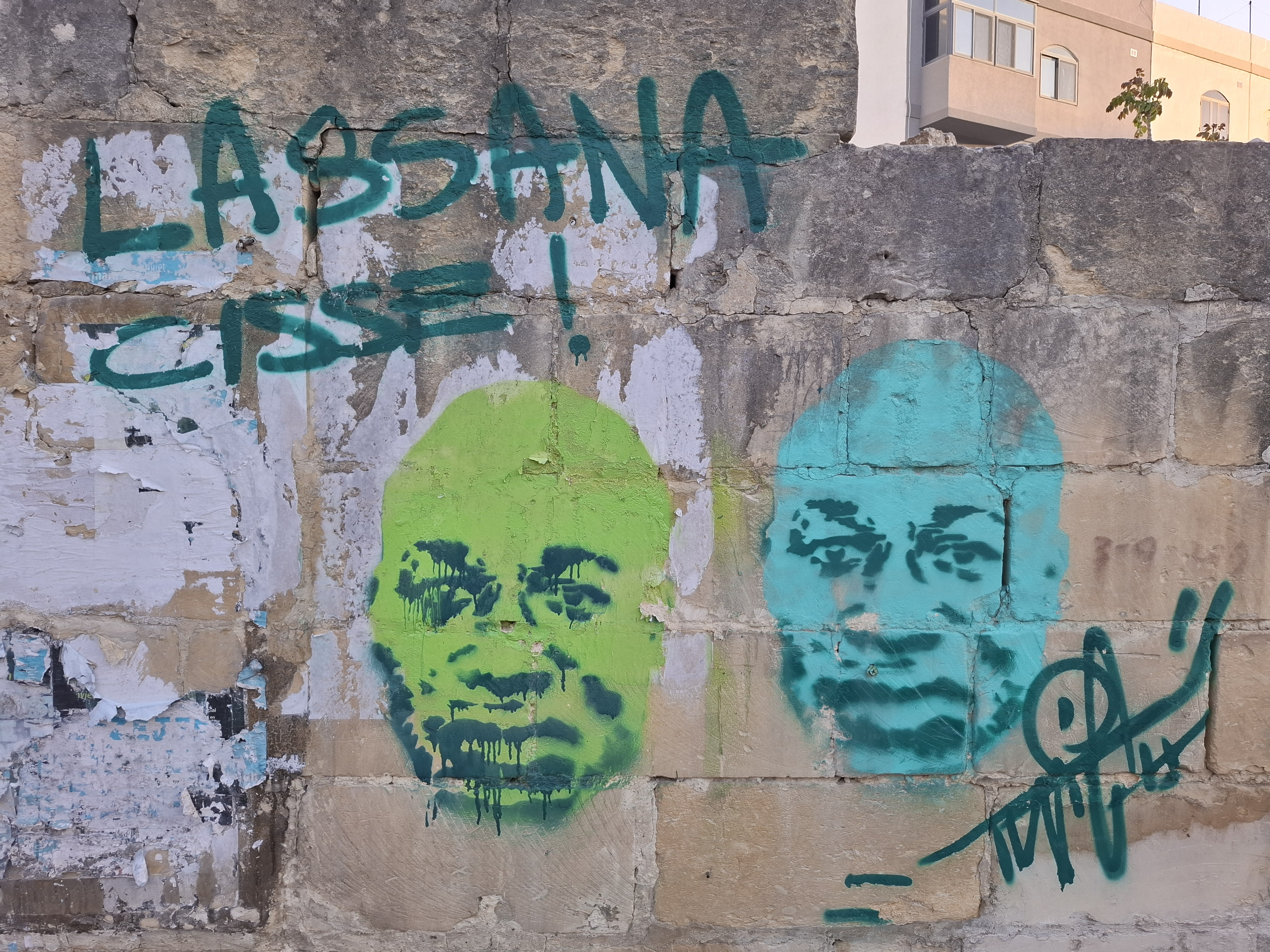
Mural for Lassana Cissé in Fgura, near Polverista Gate

The murder of Cisse is believed to be the first case of racially motivated murder in Malta. It was widely condemned by Maltese politicians, public figures and NGOs.

On 18 May 2019, Francesco Fenech and Lorin Scicluna were arrested and they were charged with the murder of Cisse and attempted murder of Ibrahim Bah, Mohammed Jallow and May Malimi. Both Fenech and Scicluna were soldiers with the Armed Forces of Malta, and at the time of the murder they were 21 and 22 years old respectively. The two soldiers denied the charges and pleaded not guilty. They were released on bail in December 2019. On 1 June 2021 the prosecution informed the court that they have presented all their evidence in this case.

On 8 June 2020, an anti-racism protest was held in front of Parliament House in Valletta in the wake of the George Floyd protests, and the protesters called for justice for Cisse's murder.

Seven years after the murder, the suspected assassins were still out on bail.

On 1st November 2026, Lorin Scicluna was found not guilty by a 8-1 jury vote of murdering Lassana Cisse and trying to murder Mohammed Jallow, Ibrahim Bah and May Malimi. Scicluna was found guilty of inflicting grievous injuries on another migrant, May Malimi, aggravated by racial motivations, and of using of a vehicle without registration plates.. Scicluna's defence lawyers had secured a 30-year plea bargain for the murder, but he refused the deal and opted for a trial instead. The acquittal for murder caused public outrage and prompted calls for an end to the jury trial system.

Scicluna’s defence pinned the murder on Francesco Fenech, who is alleged to have fired the shots that killed Cisse and injured Bah and Jallow. Fenech is yet to sit for jury trial.
