= Sean Sullivan (footballer) =

Maltese footballer & coach (born 1971)

Personal information
- Full name: Sean Sullivan
- Date of birth: 16 September 1971 (age 55)
- Place of birth: Valletta, Malta
- Height: 5 ft 10 in (1.78 m)
- Position: Goalkeeper

Team information
- Current team: Valletta (goalkeeper coach)

Senior career*
| Years | Team | Apps | (Gls) |
| 1990–1994 | St. Andrews | 65 | (0) |
| 1994–1996 | Hamrun Spartans | 31 | (0) |
| 1996–2006 | Valletta | 159 | (0) |
| 1998–1999 | → Floriana (loan) | 24 | (0) |
| 2006–2007 | Birkirkara | 9 | (0) |
| 2007–2009 | Hamrun Spartans | 19 | (0) |
| Total | | 307 | (0) |

International career^{‡}
- Malta U16
| 1989-1990 | Malta U18 | 7 | (0) |
| 1991-1993 | Malta U21 | 5 | (0) |
| 1994–1996 | Malta | 3 | (0) |

Managerial career
- 2009–: Valletta (goalkeeper coach)
- * Club domestic league appearances and goals as of 11 October 2009 ‡ National team caps and goals as of 11 October 2009

Sean Sullivan (born 16 September 1971) is a former professional footballer and current goalkeeper coach for Maltese Premier League side Valletta, he played as a goalkeeper during his career.

== International career ==
Sullivan made his debut for Malta in an April 1994 friendly match against Azerbaijan and earned a total of 3 caps (no goals). His final international was a February 1996 Rothmans Tournament match against Iceland.

== Honours ==
- Maltese Premier League: 3

1997, 1998, 2001

- FA Trophy: 2

1997, 2001
