= Chris Okoh (footballer) =

Maltese footballer

Personal information
- Full name: Christopher Chinedu Okoh
- Date of birth: 5 June 1976 (age 50)
- Place of birth: Nigeria
- Position: Defender

Senior career*
| Years | Team | Apps | (Gls) |
| 1995–1996 | Valletta | 43 | (6) |
| 1996–1997 | Floriana | 38 | (5) |
| 1998–1999 | Kercem Ajax | 25 | (3) |
| 1999–2001 | Naxxar Lions | 6 | (0) |
| 2001 | Pietà Hotspurs | 14 | (1) |
| 2002 | Birkirkara | 20 | (1) |
| 2002–2003 | Sliema Wanderers | 58 | (4) |
| 2004–2007 | Pietà Hotspurs | | |

International career
| 2001 | Malta | 3 | (0) |
- * Club domestic league appearances and goals

Christopher Chinedu Okoh (born 5 June 1976) is a former professional footballer who played as a defender. Born in Nigeria, he represented the Malta national team.

== Playing career ==
He played for Valletta, Floriana, Kercem Ajax, Naxxar Lions, Birkirkara and Sliema Wanderers.

== International career ==
He also represented the Malta national team.
