= List of ambassadors of the United States to Malta =

Ambassador of the United States to Malta
- Seal of the United States Department of State

- Flag of a United States ambassador

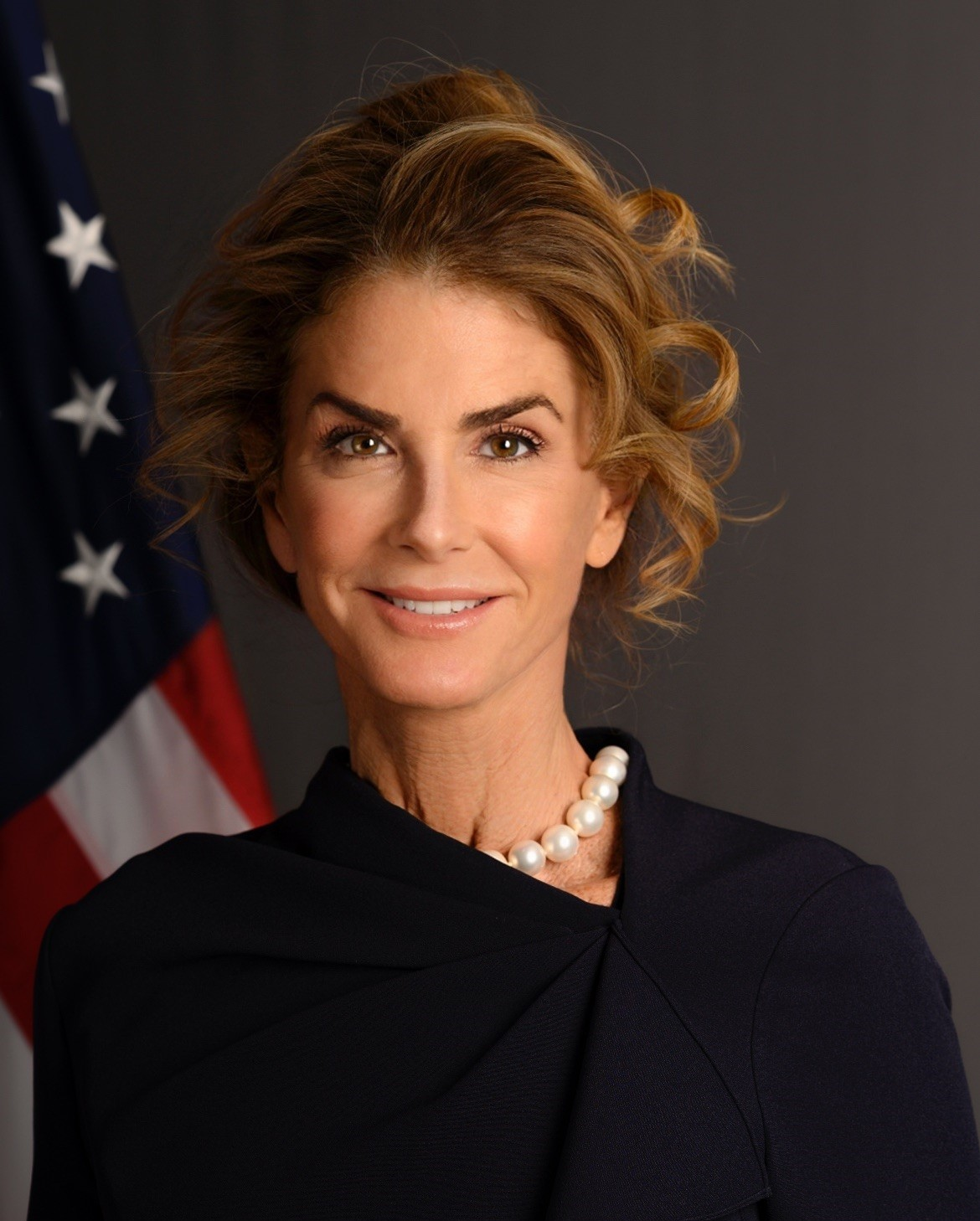
- Incumbent; Somers Farkas since November 26, 2025
- Residence: Villa Apap Bologna
- Nominator: The president of the United States
- Appointer: The president with Senate advice and consent
- Inaugural holder: Harrison Lewis as Chargé d'affaires ad interim
- Formation: September 21, 1964
- Website: U.S. Embassy - Valletta

This is a list of ambassadors of the United States to Malta. Initially a part of the British Empire, Malta was granted full independence as the State of Malta on September 21, 1964. The United States recognized the new nation and established full diplomatic relations after its independence, and retained relations after Malta became a republic in 1974. Harrison Lewis was appointed as the first American diplomat in Malta as Chargé d'Affaires ad interim until an ambassador could be commissioned.

== Embassy ==
The Embassy of the United States in Malta was first established in the capital Valletta, on September 21, 1964. It eventually moved to Sliema, and in 1974 it moved again to Floriana, a suburb of the Maltese capital. On July 4, 2011, the embassy was moved once again to a larger complex in Ta' Qali National Park in Attard. The embassy's website still lists its location as "Valletta".

The ambassador's official residence is Villa Apap Bologna, also located in Attard.

== Ambassadors ==
Name	Title	Appointed	Presented credentials	Terminated mission	Notes
George J. Feldman – Political appointee	Ambassador Extraordinary and Plenipotentiary	July 22, 1965	October 5, 1965	September 6, 1967	
Hugh H. Smythe – Political appointee	Ambassador Extraordinary and Plenipotentiary	October 18, 1967	December 29, 1967	August 16, 1969	
John C. Pritzlaff, Jr. – Political appointee	Ambassador Extraordinary and Plenipotentiary	July 8, 1969	September 4, 1969	February 24, 1972	
John I. Getz – Career FSO	Ambassador Extraordinary and Plenipotentiary	February 15, 1972	March 9, 1972	July 18, 1974	
Robert P. Smith – Career FSO	Ambassador Extraordinary and Plenipotentiary	July 23, 1974	September 24, 1974	October 29, 1976	
Lowell Bruce Laingen (Note: Laingen was commissioned during a recess of the Senate and recommissioned after confirmation on September 15, 1977. Laingen was the chargé d’affaires at the U.S. Embassy in Tehran at the time of the Iran hostage crisis.) – Career FSO	Ambassador Extraordinary and Plenipotentiary	November 17, 1976	January 11, 1977	January 20, 1979	
Joan Margaret Clark – Career FSO	Ambassador Extraordinary and Plenipotentiary	March 21, 1979	March 26, 1979	February 21, 1981	
Frank P. Wardlaw	Chargé d’Affaires a.i.	February 21, 1981	-	August 1982	
James Malone Rentschler – Career FSO	Ambassador Extraordinary and Plenipotentiary	August 18, 1982	October 19, 1982	July 26, 1985	
Gary L. Matthews – Career FSO	Ambassador Extraordinary and Plenipotentiary	August 1, 1985	September 19, 1985	May 23, 1987	
Peter R. Sommer – Political appointee	Ambassador Extraordinary and Plenipotentiary	September 28, 1987	October 9, 1987	October 8, 1989	
Sally J. Novetzke – Political appointee	Ambassador Extraordinary and Plenipotentiary	October 10, 1989	November 9, 1989	February 28, 1993	
William A. Moffitt	Chargé d’Affaires a.i.	February 28, 1993	-	June 1994	
Charles N. Patterson, Jr.	Chargé d’Affaires a.i.	June 1994	-	July 6, 1994	
Joseph R. Paolino, Jr. – Political appointee	Ambassador Extraordinary and Plenipotentiary	June 9, 1994	July 6, 1994	June 2, 1996	
Charles N. Patterson, Jr.	Chargé d’Affaires a.i.	June 2, 1996	-	July 1997	
Elizabeth Barnett	Chargé d’Affaires a.i.	July 1997	-	January 8, 1998	
Kathryn Linda Haycock Proffitt – Political appointee	Ambassador Extraordinary and Plenipotentiary	November 10, 1997	January 8, 1998	March 1, 2001	
Anthony H. Gioia – Political appointee	Ambassador Extraordinary and Plenipotentiary	July 12, 2001	September 6, 2001	December 7, 2004	
Alexander R. Kingfisher	Chargé d’Affaires a.i.	December 7, 2004	-	June 21, 2005	
Molly H. Bordonaro – Political appointee	Ambassador Extraordinary and Plenipotentiary	June 21, 2005	September 7, 2005	February 6, 2009	
Douglas Kmiec - Political appointee	Ambassador Extraordinary and Plenipotentiary	September 2, 2009	September 17, 2009	May 31, 2011	
Richard M. Mills	Chargé d’Affaires a.i.	June 1, 2011		May 2, 2012	
Gina Abercrombie-Winstanley - Career FSO	Ambassador Extraordinary and Plenipotentiary	March 29, 2012	May 2, 2012	January 26, 2016	
G. Kathleen Hill - Career FSO	Ambassador Extraordinary and Plenipotentiary	January 13, 2016	February 25, 2016	September 29, 2018	
Mark A. Schapiro	Chargé d’Affaires a.i.	September 29, 2018	-	August 31, 2020	
Gwendolyn S. Green	Chargé d’Affaires a.i.	August 31, 2020	-	October 27, 2022	
Constance J. Milstein - Political appointee	Ambassador Extraordinary and Plenipotentiary	August 6, 2022	October 27, 2022	January 20, 2025	
Ken Toko	Chargé d’Affaires a.i.	January 20, 2025		November 26, 2025	
Somers Farkas - Political appointee	Ambassador Extraordinary and Plenipotentiary	October 7, 2025	November 26, 2025	Incumbent	

== See also ==
- Malta–United States relations
- Foreign relations of Malta
- Ambassadors of the United States
