= Anthony H. Gioia =

American businessman & diplomat (born 1942)

Anthony Gioia
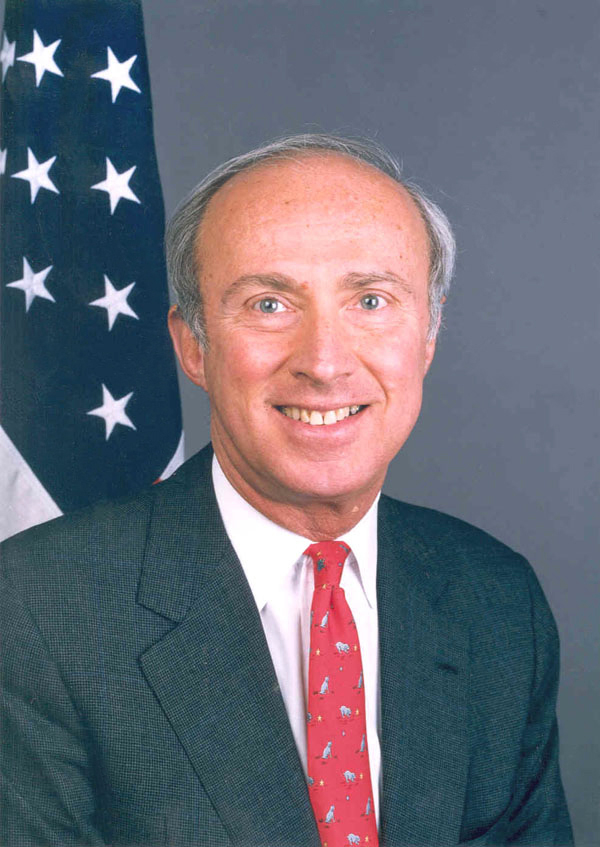

United States Ambassador to Malta
- In office August 8, 2001 – December 6, 2004
- President: George W. Bush
- Preceded by: Kathryn Linda Haycock Proffitt
- Succeeded by: Molly H. Bordonaro

Personal details
- Born: November 10, 1942 (age 83)
- Party: Republican
- Education: University at Buffalo (BA); University of Southern California (MBA)
- Profession: Businessman

Anthony Horace Gioia (born November 10, 1942) is an American businessman and statesman, who served as the 14th United States Ambassador to Malta from 2001 to 2004. A member of the Republican Party, Gioia previously served as the president of the Gioia Macaroni Company and as Chairman of the National Pasta Association.

== Notes ==
Diplomatic posts
Preceded by Kathryn Linda Haycock Proffitt	U.S. Ambassador to Malta; 2001–2004	Succeeded by Molly Bordonaro
