= List of diplomatic missions of Malta =

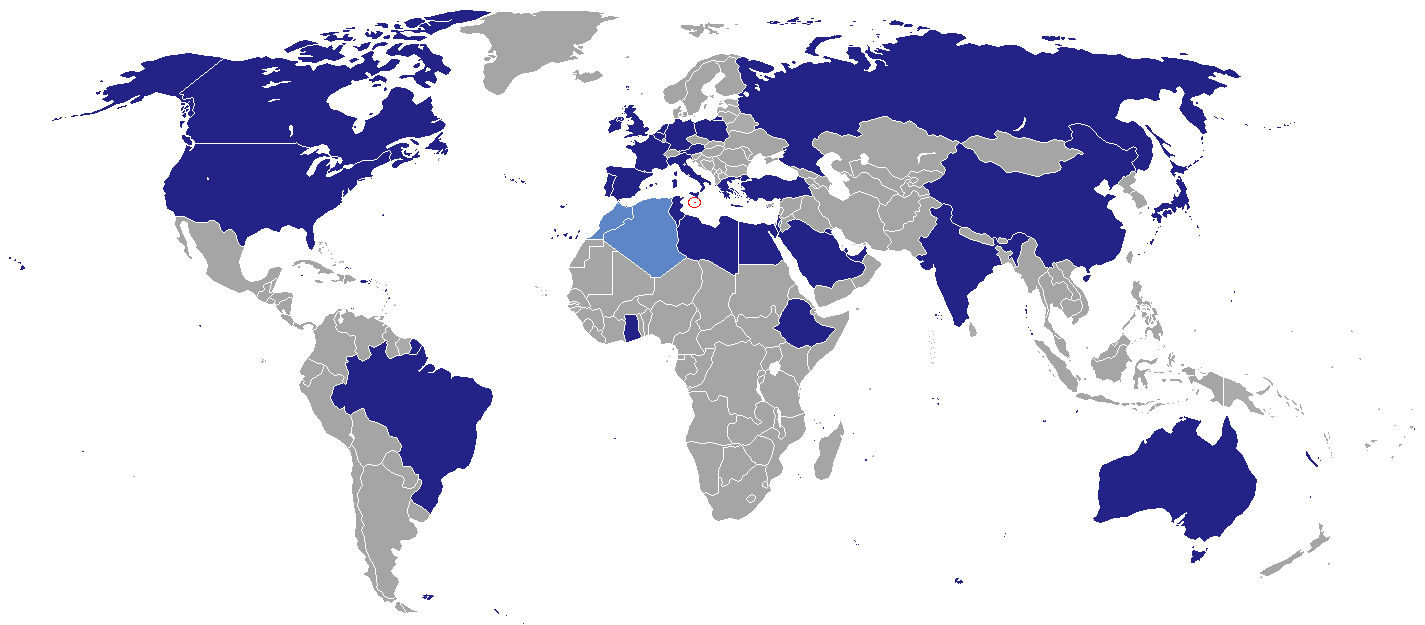
Countries with Maltese diplomatic missions

This is a list of diplomatic missions of Malta.

Malta, being a microstate has a small, albeit gradually-growing diplomatic network.

Honorary consulates and trade missions are excluded from this listing.

== Current missions ==
=== Africa ===
Host country	Host city	Mission	Concurrent accreditation	Ref.
Algeria	Algiers	Consulate		
Egypt	Cairo	Embassy	Countries: Sudan; International Organizations: Arab League	
Ethiopia	Addis Ababa	Embassy	Countries: Djibouti; Rwanda; International Organizations: African Union	
Ghana	Accra	High Commission		
Libya	Tripoli	Embassy		
Morocco	Casablanca	Consulate-General		
Tunisia	Tunis	Embassy		

=== Americas ===
Host country	Host city	Mission	Concurrent accreditation	Ref.
Brazil	Brasília	Embassy	Countries: Chile	
Canada	Ottawa	High Commission		
Canada	Toronto	Consulate-General		
United States	Washington, D.C.	Embassy	Countries: Bahamas; Mexico; Uruguay; International Organizations: Organization of American States	
United States	New York City	Consulate-General	Countries: Bahamas; Mexico; Uruguay; International Organizations: Organization of American States	

=== Asia ===
Host country	Host city	Mission	Concurrent accreditation	Ref.
China	Beijing	Embassy	Countries: Cambodia; Mongolia; Philippines; Vietnam	
China	Shanghai	Consulate-General	Countries: Cambodia; Mongolia; Philippines; Vietnam	
India	New Delhi	High Commission	Countries: Bangladesh; Maldives; Nepal; Sri Lanka	
Israel	Tel Aviv	Embassy		
Japan	Tokyo	Embassy		
Kuwait	Kuwait City	Embassy	Countries: Iraq; Jordan	
Palestine	Ramallah	Representative Office		
Qatar	Doha	Embassy		
Saudi Arabia	Riyadh	Embassy	Countries: Bahrain; Yemen	
Turkey	Ankara	Embassy		
Turkey	Istanbul	Consulate-General		
United Arab Emirates	Abu Dhabi	Embassy	International Organizations: International Renewable Energy Agency	
United Arab Emirates	Dubai	Consulate-General	International Organizations: International Renewable Energy Agency	

=== Europe ===
Host country	Host city	Mission	Concurrent accreditation	Ref.
Austria	Vienna	Embassy	International Organizations: United Nations; Organization for Security and Co-operation in Europe	
Belgium	Brussels	Embassy	Countries: Luxembourg; International Organizations: NATO	
France	Paris	Embassy		
Germany	Berlin	Embassy		
Greece	Athens	Embassy	Countries: Cyprus	
Ireland	Dublin	Embassy		
Italy	Rome	Embassy	Countries: San Marino; International Organizations: Food and Agriculture Organization; International Fund for Agricultural Development; World Food Programme	
Netherlands	The Hague	Embassy	International Organizations: Organisation for the Prohibition of Chemical Weapons	
Poland	Warsaw	Embassy	Countries: Armenia	
Portugal	Lisbon	Embassy		
Russia	Moscow	Embassy	Countries: Uzbekistan	
Spain	Madrid	Embassy		
United Kingdom	London	High Commission	International Organizations: Commonwealth of Nations	

=== Oceania ===
Host country	Host city	Mission	Concurrent accreditation	Ref.
Australia	Canberra	High Commission	Countries: New Zealand; Multilateral Organizations: Association of Southeast Asian Nations	
Australia	Melbourne	Consulate-General	Countries: New Zealand; Multilateral Organizations: Association of Southeast Asian Nations	
Australia	Sydney	Consulate-General	Countries: New Zealand; Multilateral Organizations: Association of Southeast Asian Nations	

=== Multilateral organizations ===
Organization	Host city	Host country	Mission	Concurrent accreditation	Ref.
Council of Europe	Strasbourg	Belgium	Permanent Representation		
European Union	Brussels	Belgium	Permanent Representation		
United Nations	New York City	United States	Permanent Mission	Countries: Guatemala	
United Nations	Geneva	Switzerland	Permanent Mission	International Organizations: World Health Organization	

== Gallery ==
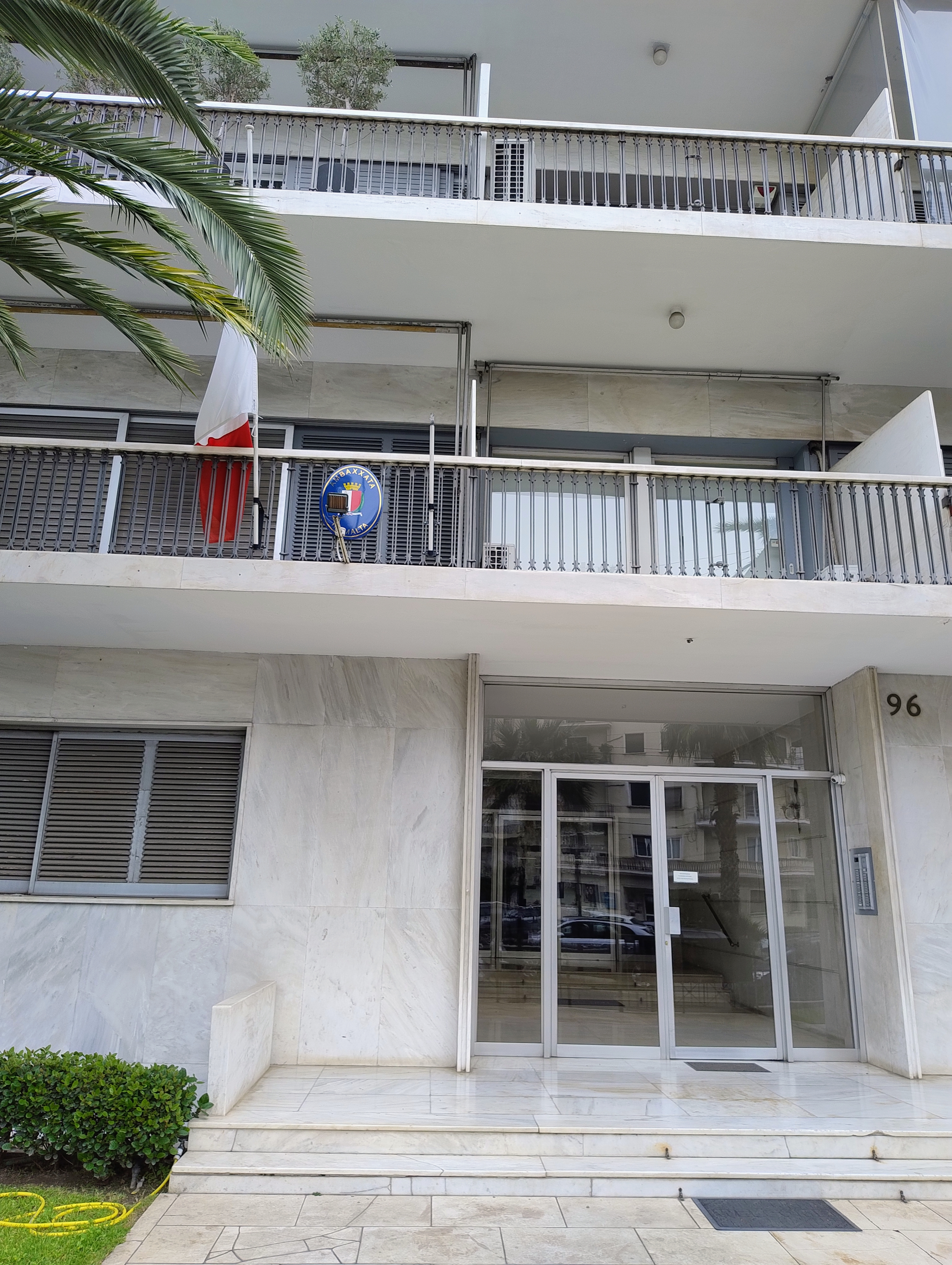
Embassy in Athens

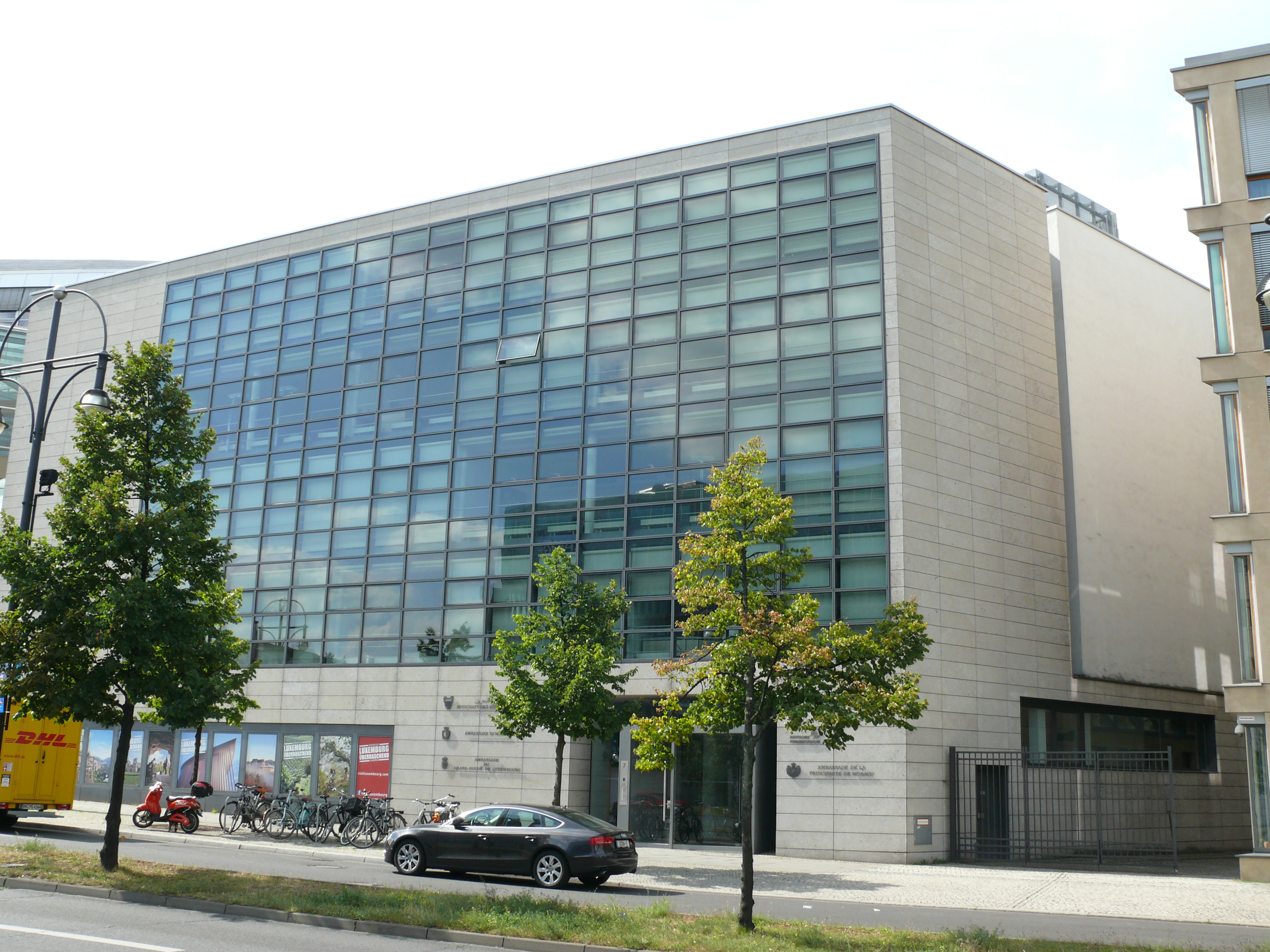
Embassy in Berlin

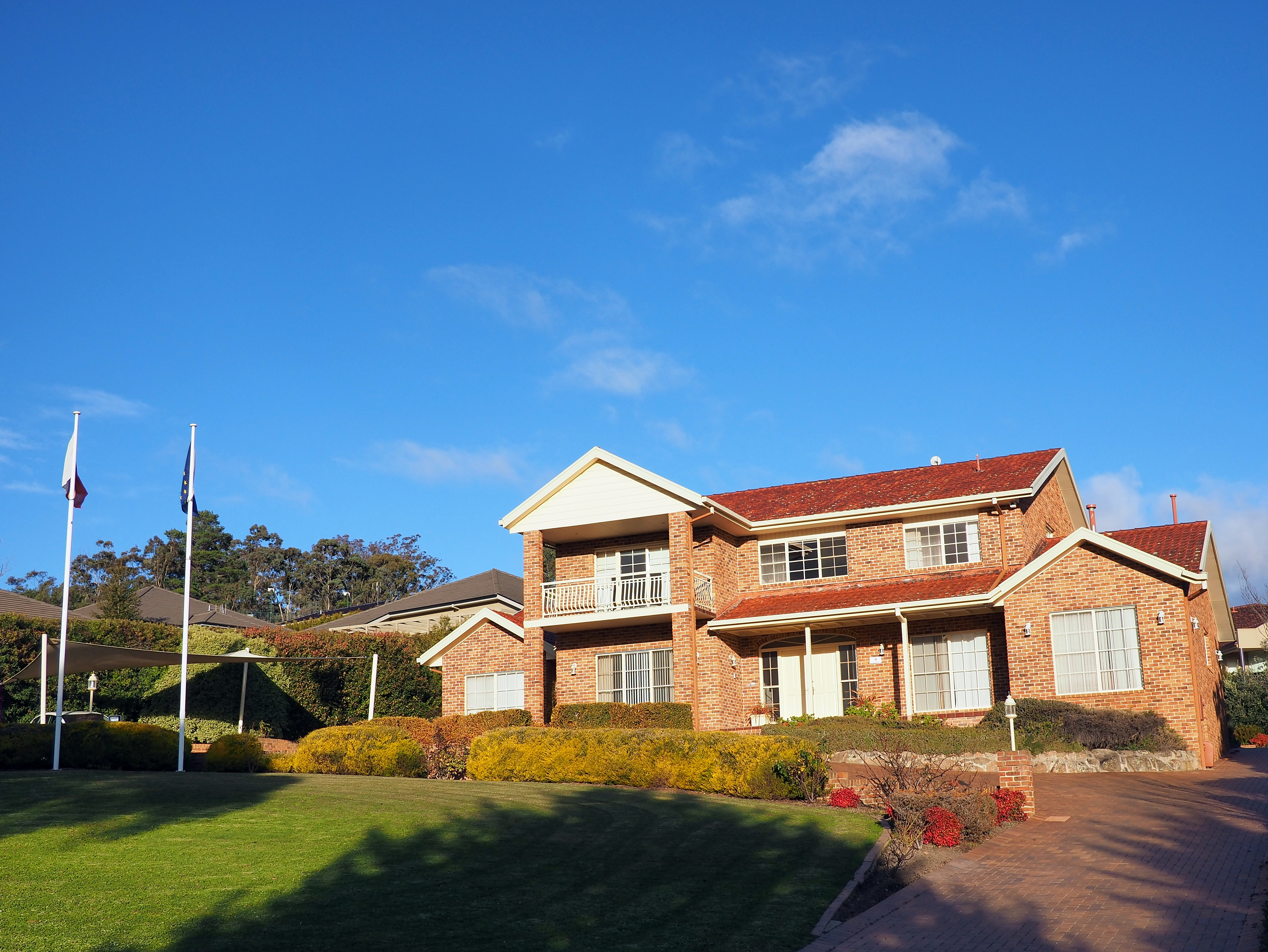
High Commission in Canberra

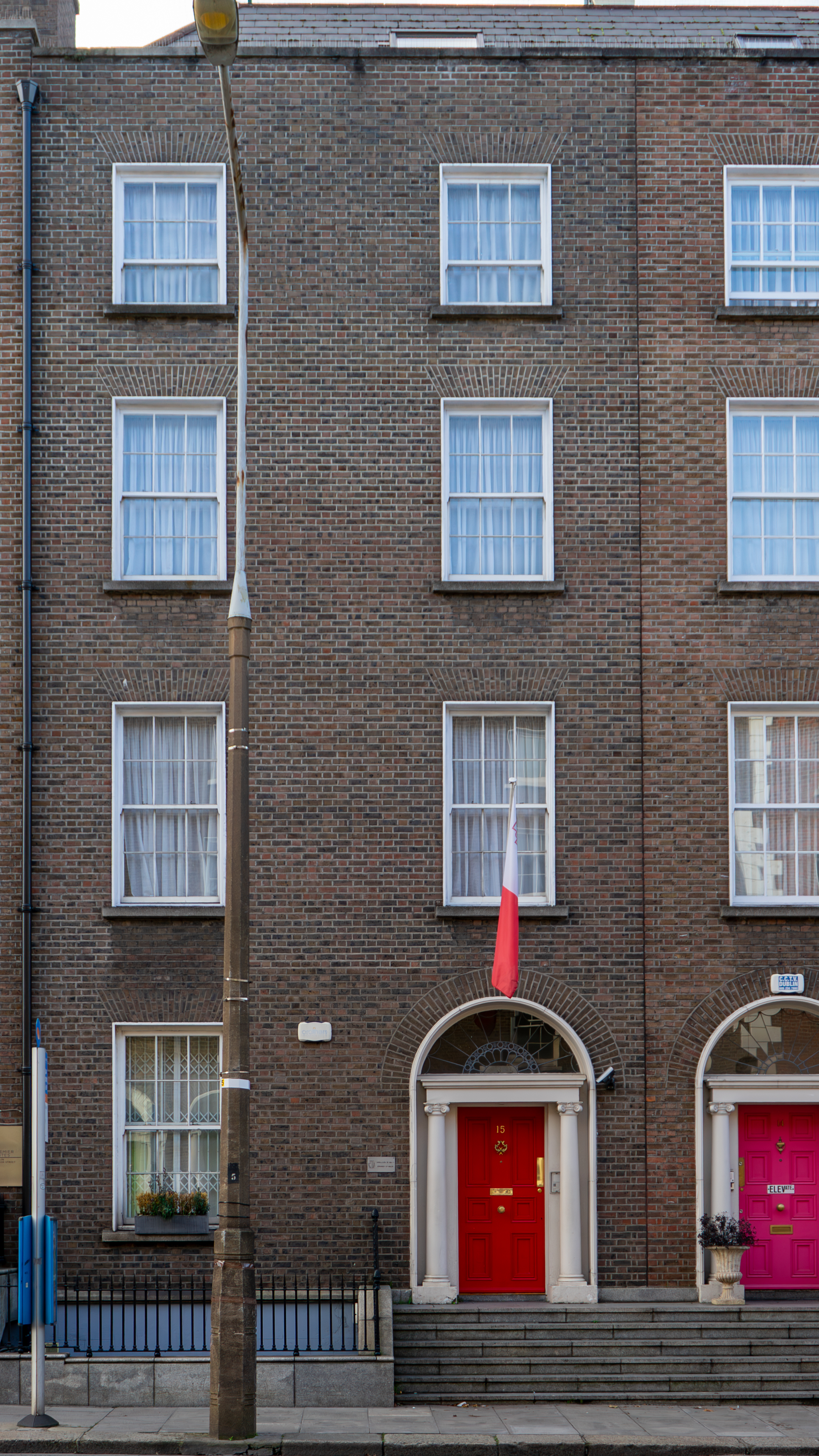
Embassy in Dublin

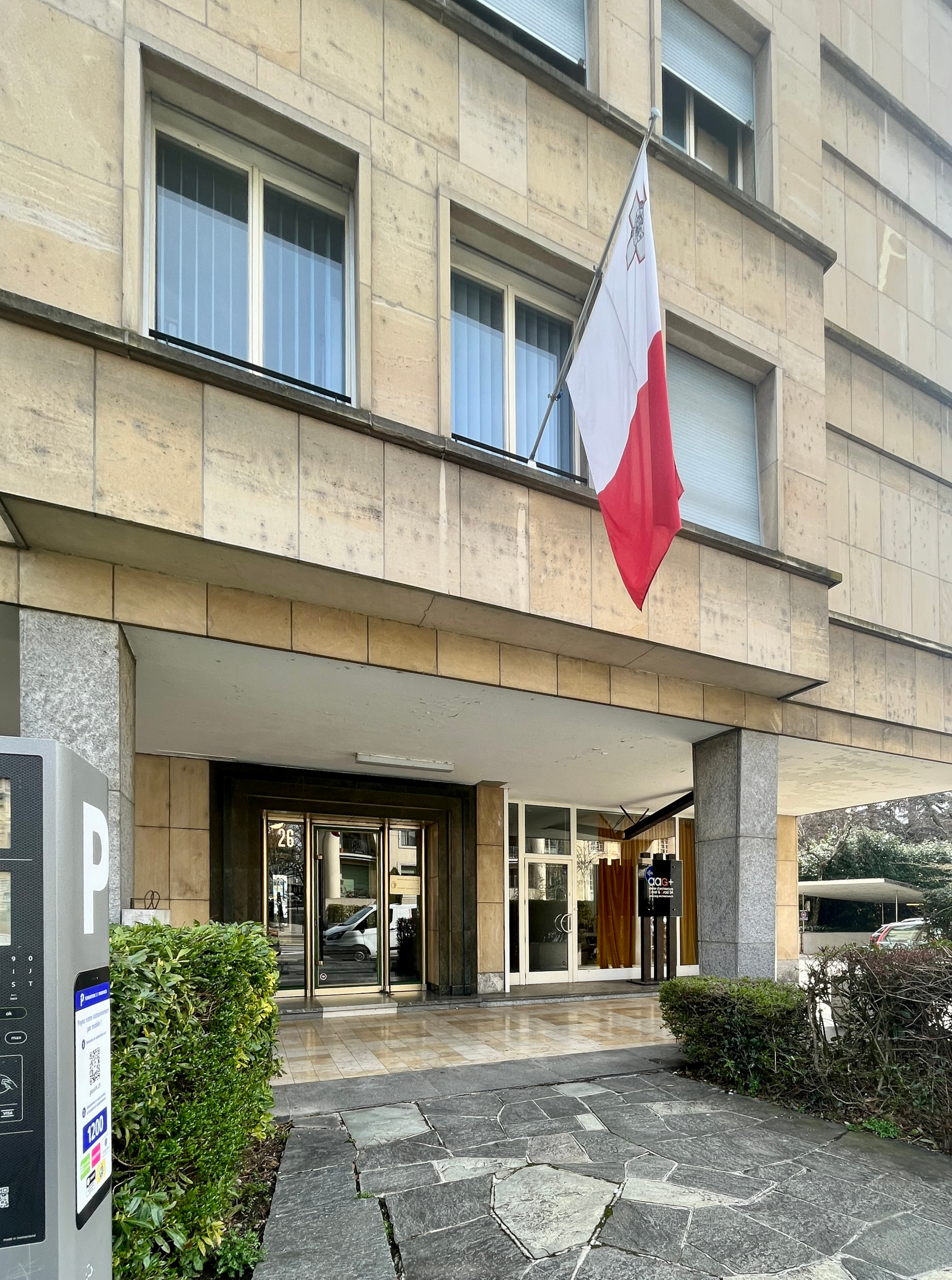
Permanent Mission to the United Nations in Geneva

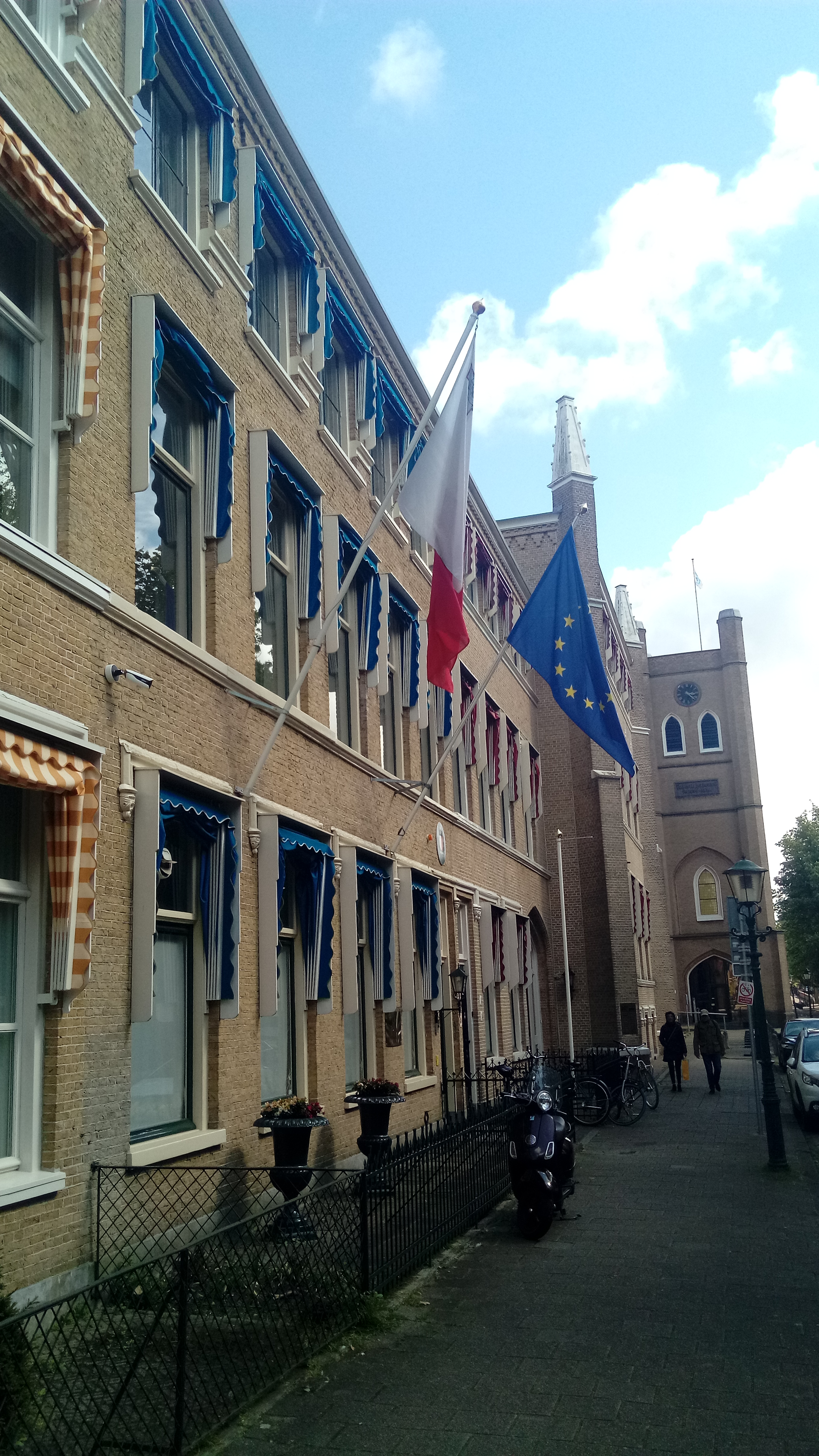
Embassy in The Hague

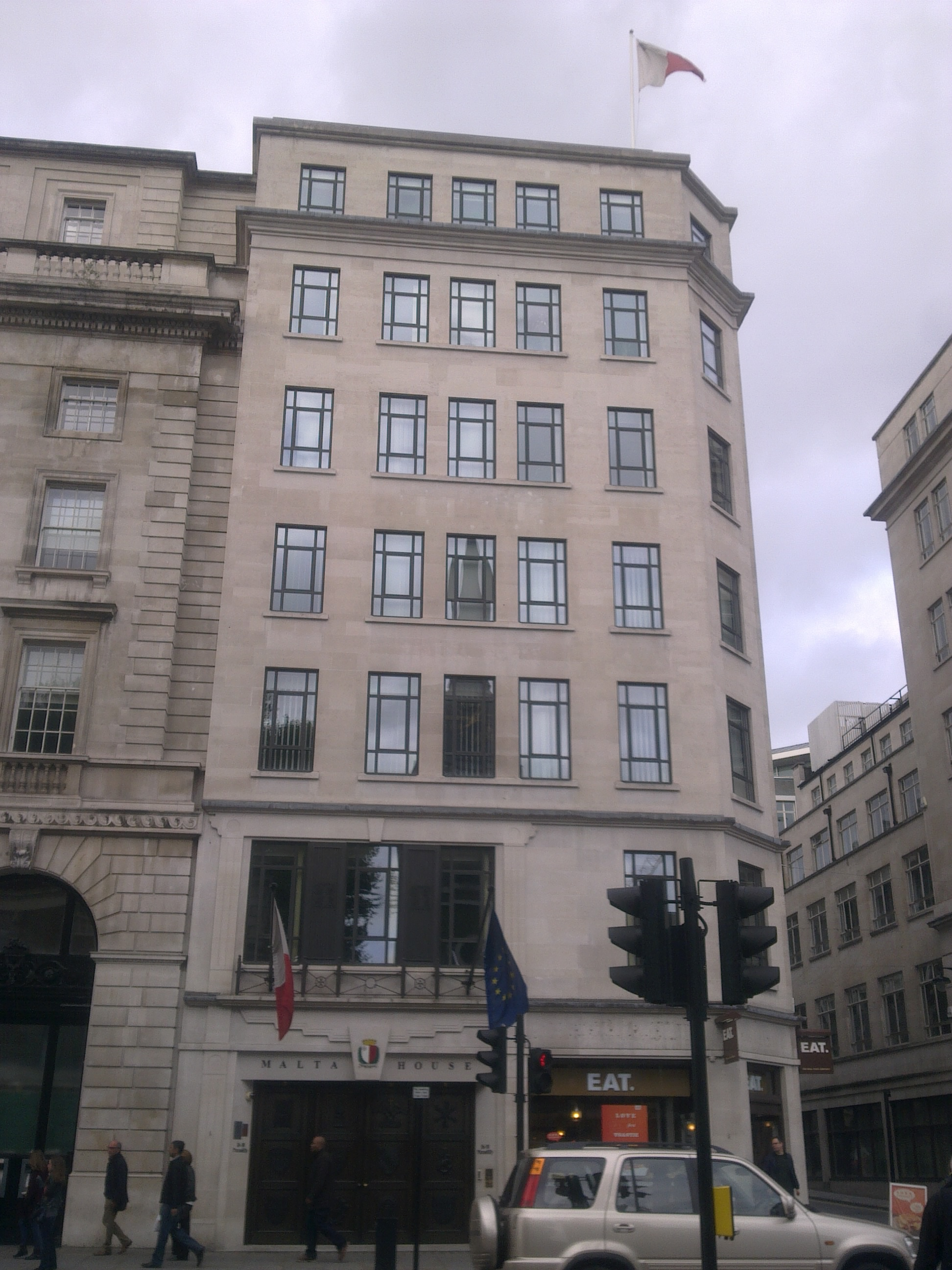
High Commission in London

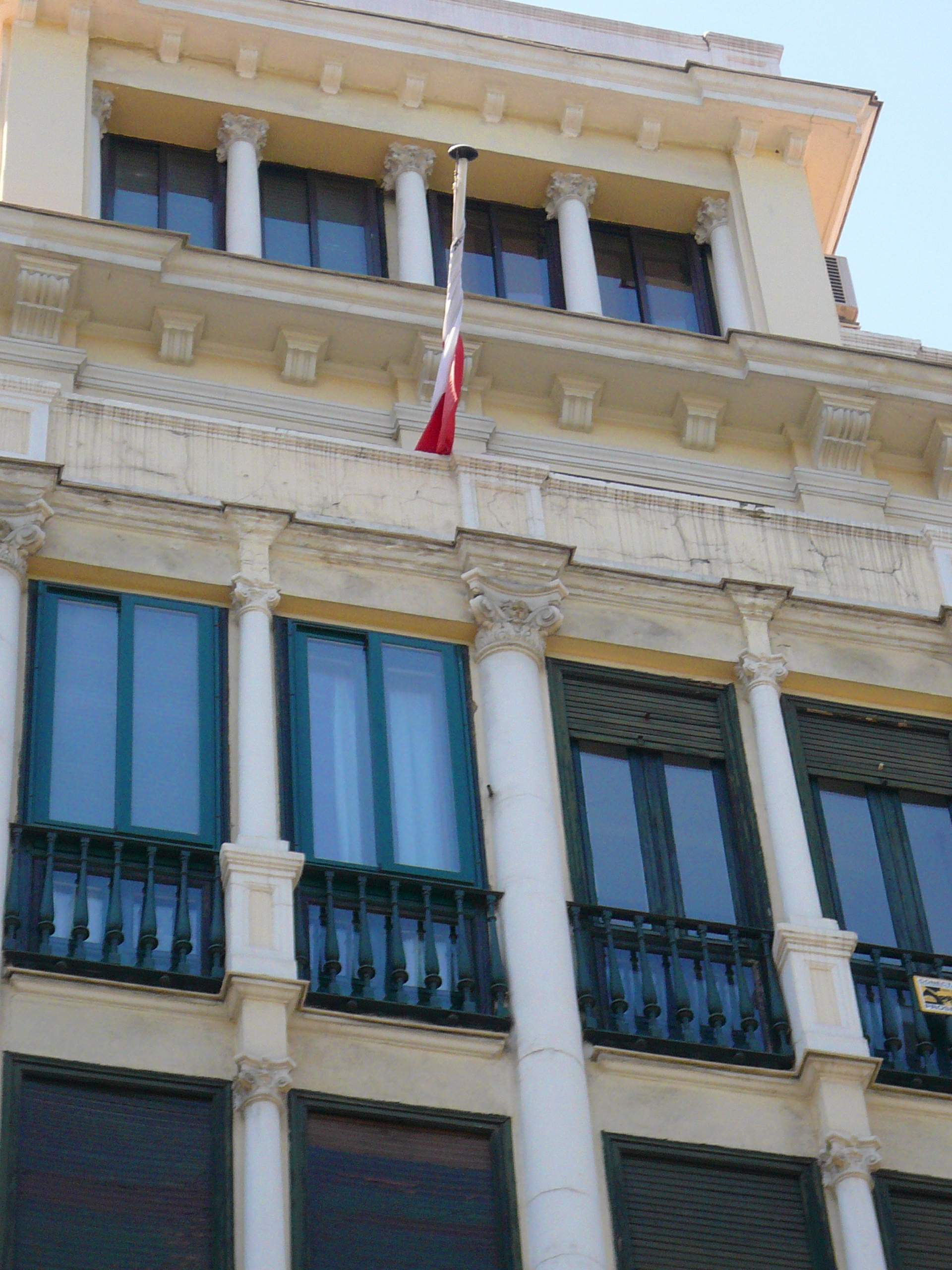
Embassy in Madrid

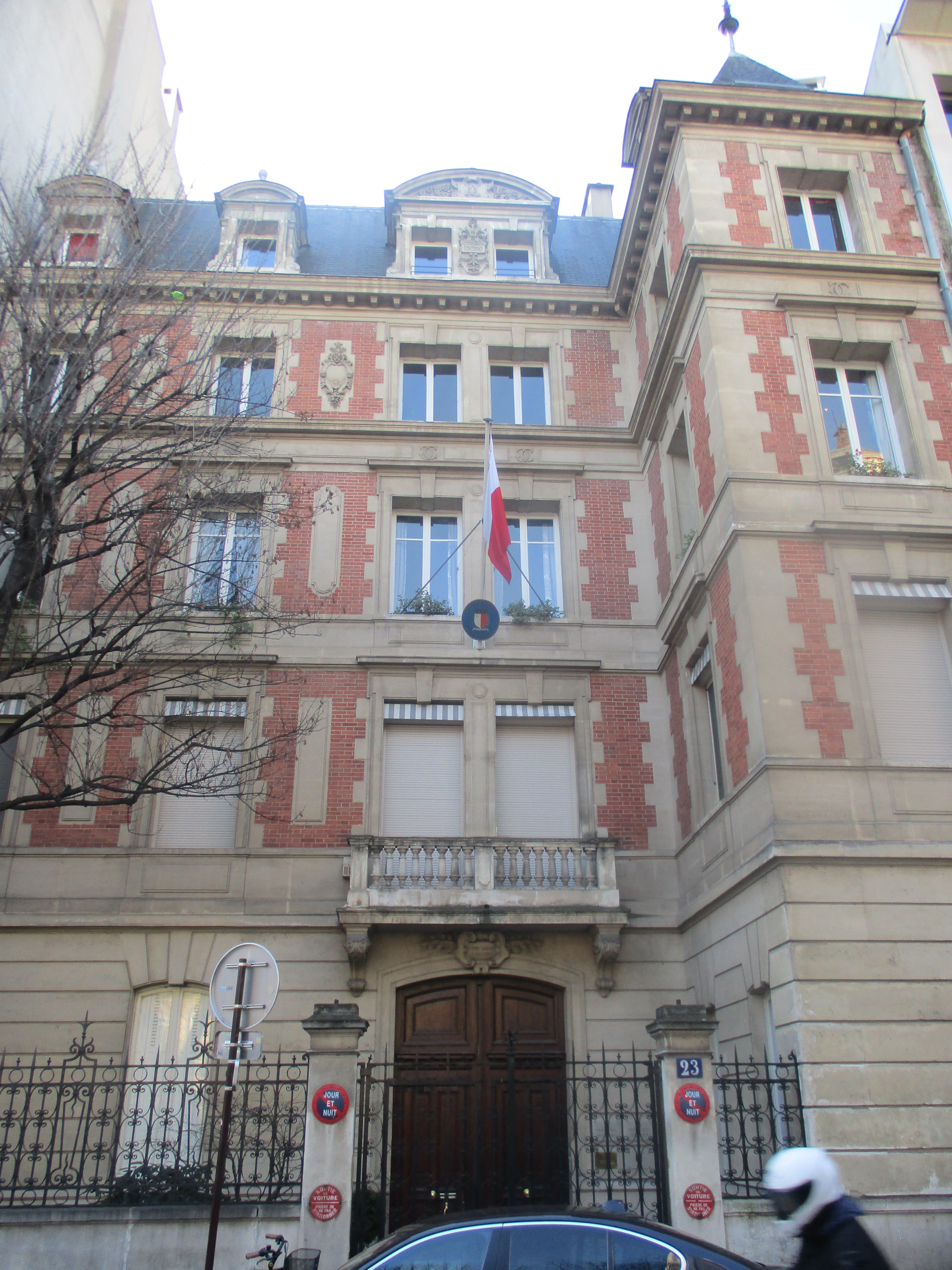
Embassy in Paris

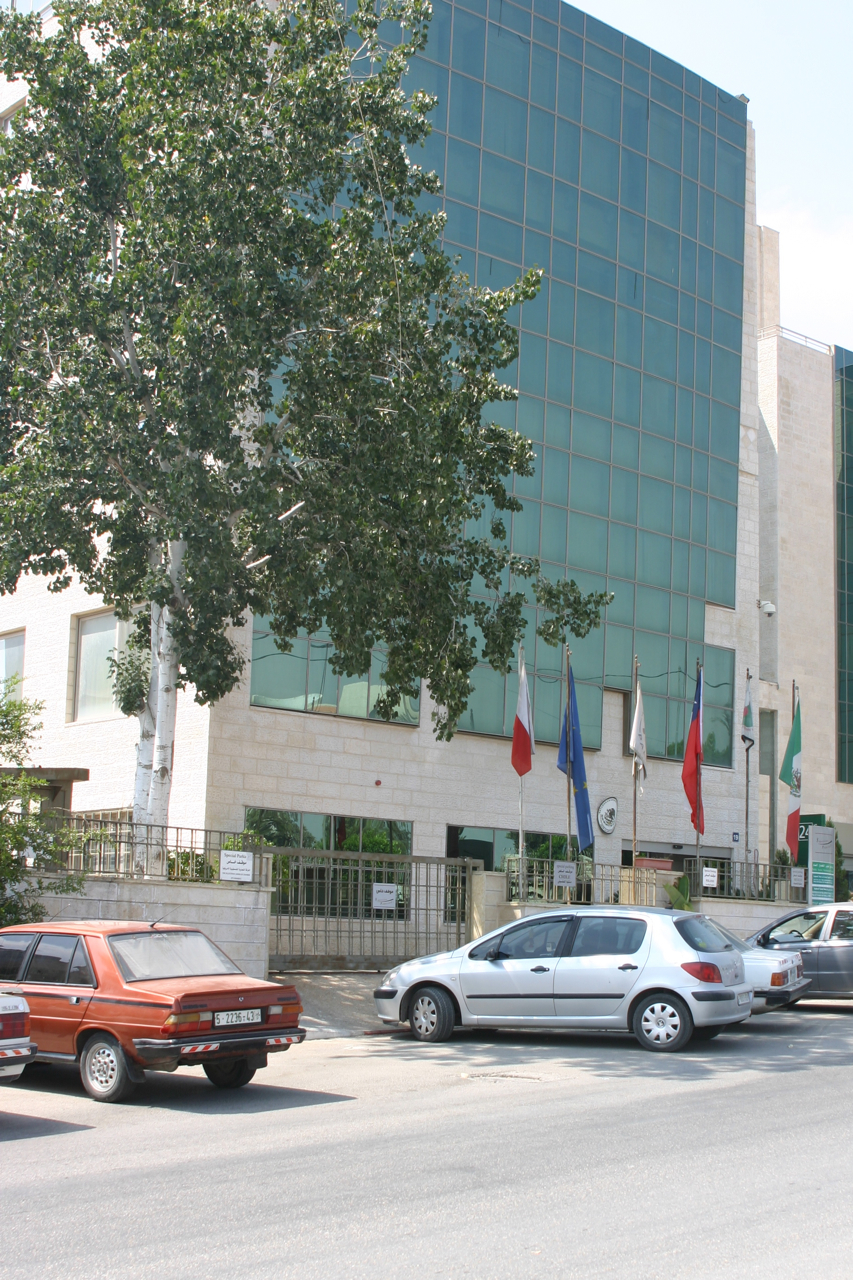
Building hosting the Representative office in Ramallah

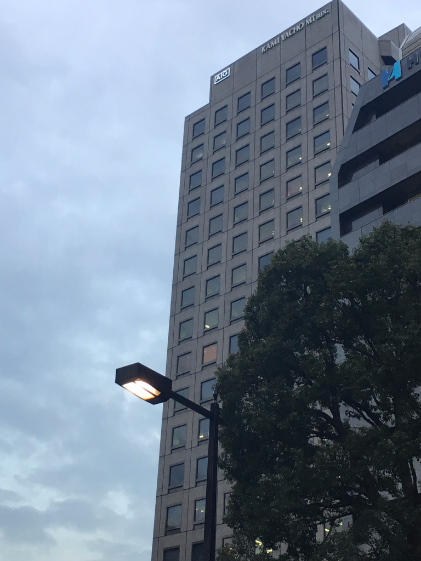
Building hosting the embassy in Tokyo

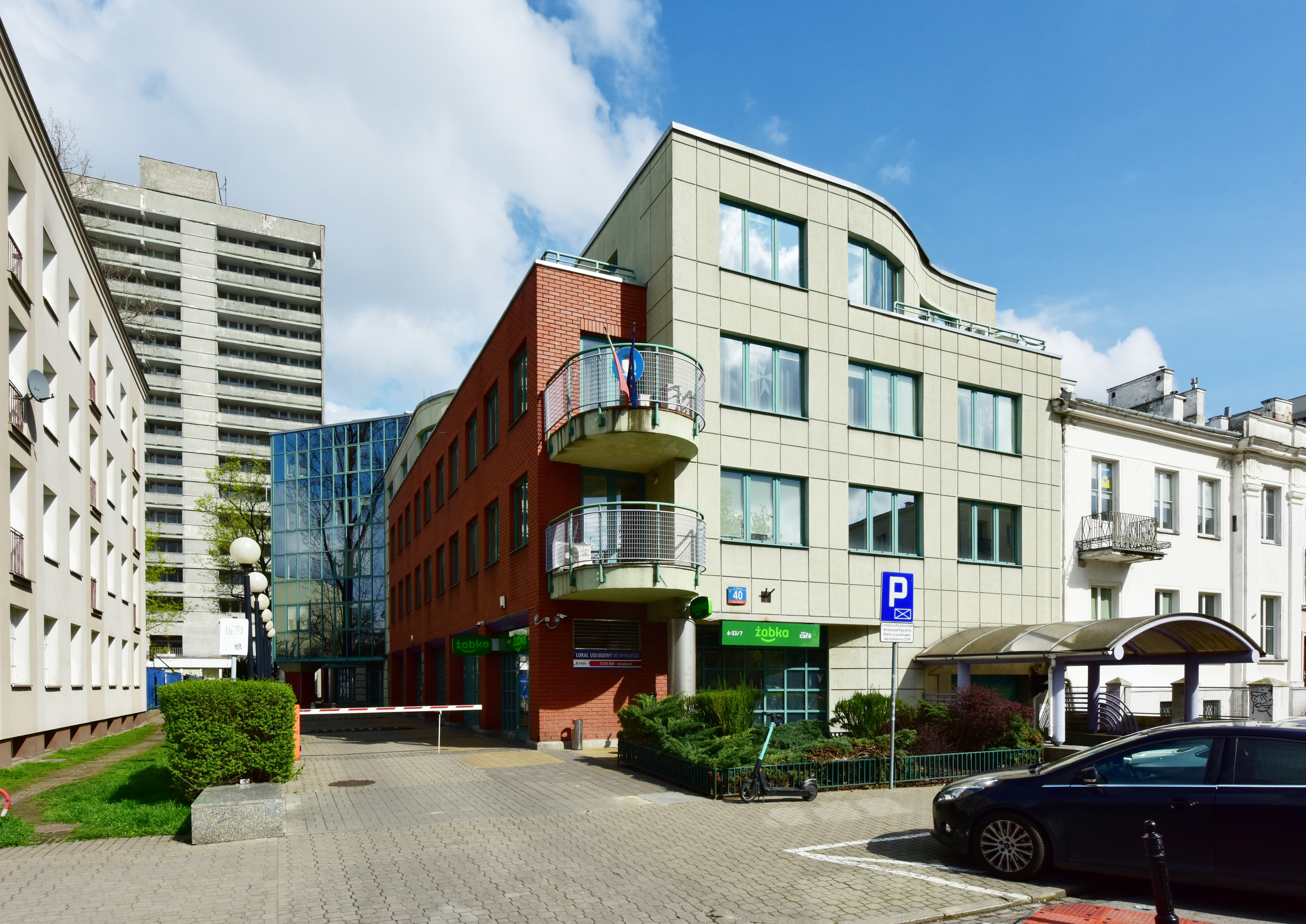
Building hosting the embassy in Warsaw

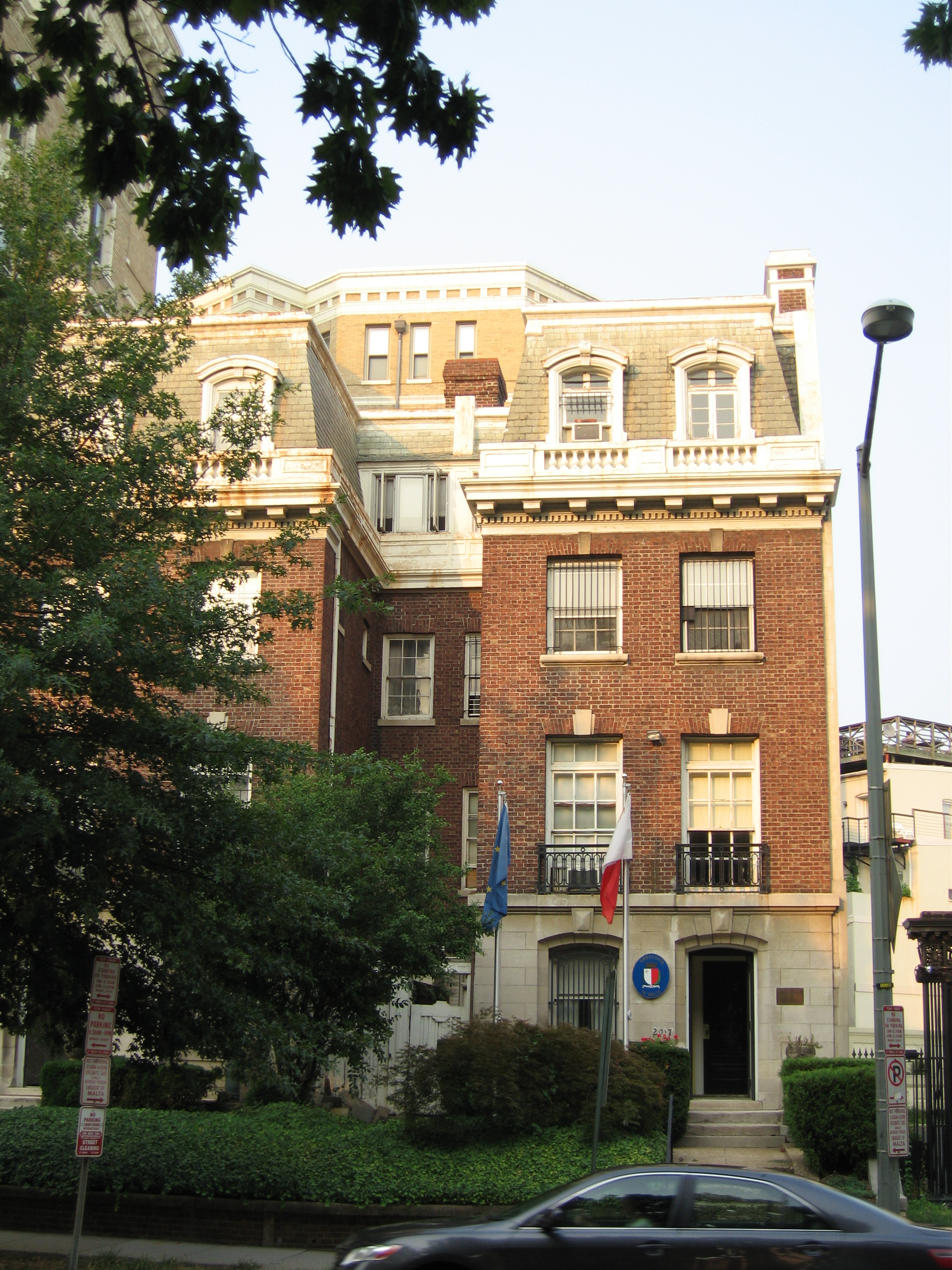
Embassy in Washington, D.C.

== Closed missions ==
Host country	Host city	Mission	Year closed	Ref.
Denmark	Copenhagen	Embassy (Note: Resident in The Hague, Netherlands)	2015	
Hungary	Budapest	Embassy	2007	
Sweden	Stockholm	Embassy	2005	

== See also ==
- Ministry of Foreign Affairs (Malta)
- Foreign relations of Malta
- List of diplomatic missions in Malta
