= G. Kathleen Hill =

American diplomat (born 1964)

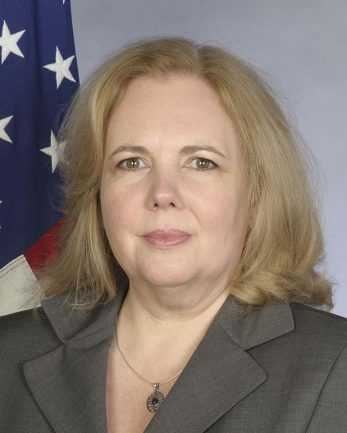

United States Ambassador to Malta
- In office January 27, 2016 – September 29, 2018
- President: Barack Obama; Donald Trump
- Preceded by: Gina Abercrombie-Winstanley
- Succeeded by: Constance J. Milstein (2022)

Personal details
- Born: 1964 (age 61–62)
- Education: University of Denver; Columbia University

Glenna Kathleen Hill (born 1964) is an American diplomat and former United States Ambassador to Malta. She was nominated by President Barack Obama on July 8, 2015, and confirmed by the Senate on December 9, 2015.

== Early life and education ==
Hill is the daughter of Mary Anne Girod Hill and Curtis Ray Hill. She earned a B.A. from the University of Denver and an M.A. from Columbia University.

== Career ==
Hill began her career in 1995 with the Foreign Service serving in U.S. embassies in Belgrade, Serbia and Sarajevo, Bosnia-Herzegovina. She then served as watch officer in the State Department Operations Center beginning in 1999.

In 2000 she began an assignment in the Bureau of Europe and Eurasian Affairs and two years later moved to the U.S. embassy in Tashkent, Uzbekistan. She then became management officer in Milan, Italy.

In 2007 she was assigned to the U.S. consulate in Vancouver, British Columbia, Canada, where she was engaged in preparations for the 2010 Winter Olympics.

She then served in the Executive Directorate of Near Eastern Affairs and South and Central Asian Affairs.

In 2013 Hill become Deputy Executive Secretary and executive director in the office of the Executive Secretary. In this role she organized over 60 overseas trips for Secretary of State John Kerry.

In 2015 President Barack Obama nominated her to succeed Gina Abercrombie-Winstanley as US ambassador to Malta. After confirmation by the Senate, she was appointed on January 13, 2016. Hill met with Malta's Minister for Foreign Affairs, Dr George William Vella, who received Hill as the ambassador designate of the United States of America, and she presented her Copie d'Usage. Hill presented her credentials to the President of Malta, Marie-Louise Coleiro Preca, on February 25, 2016. On May 18, 2018, President Donald Trump nominated Republican National Committee member Christine Toretti to succeed Hill as ambassador, pending Senate approval.

== Personal ==
In addition to English, Hill speaks Italian, Russian, and Serbian.

Diplomatic posts
Preceded by Gina Abercrombie-Winstanley	United States Ambassador to Malta; 2016–2018	Succeeded by Constance J. Milstein
