= Somers Farkas =

American diplomat and philanthropist

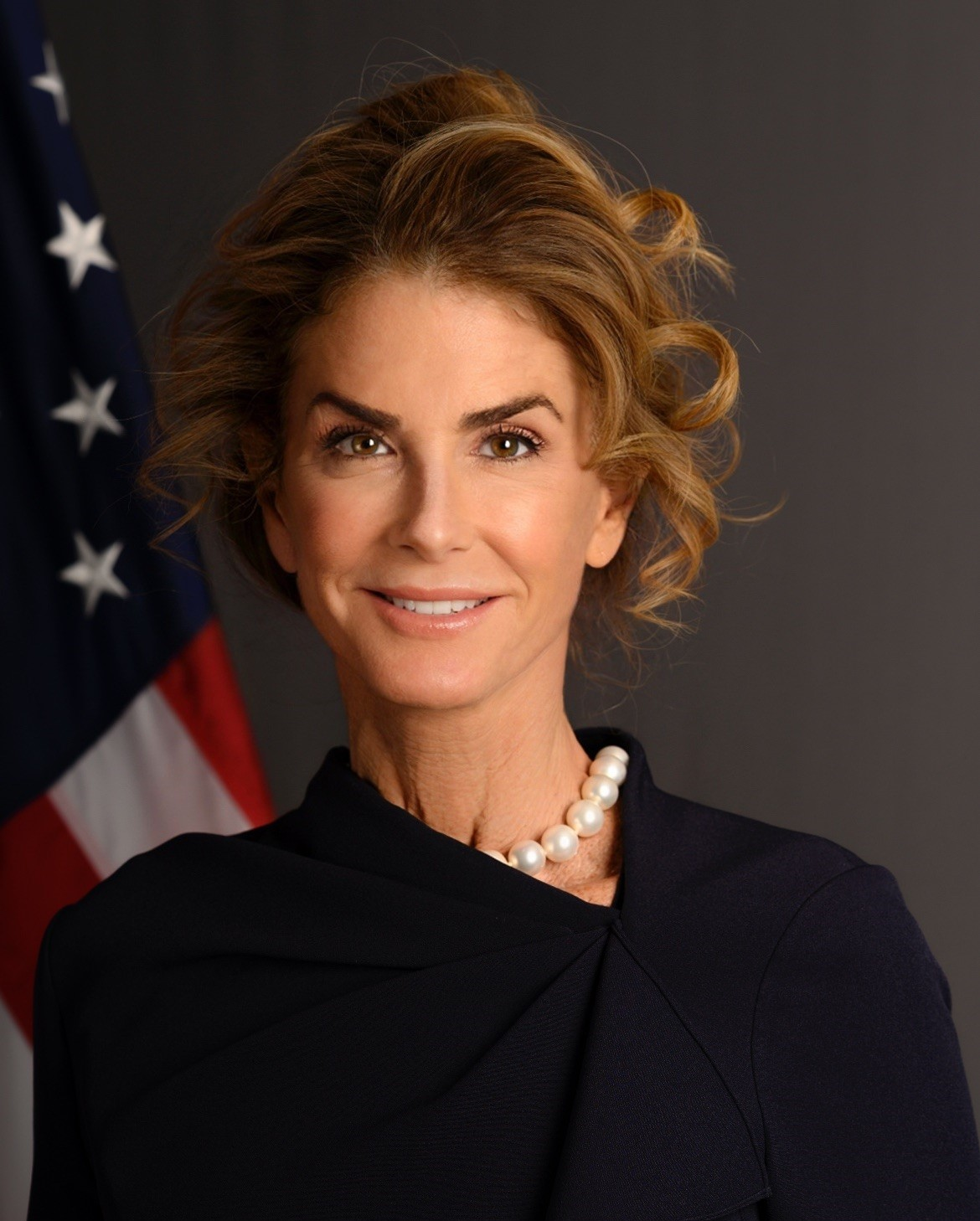
- Official portrait, 2025

United States Ambassador to Malta
- Incumbent
- Assumed office November 26, 2025
- President: Donald Trump
- Preceded by: Constance J. Milstein

Personal details
- Born: Onancock, Virginia, U.S.
- Spouse: Jonathan Farkas
- Education: University of Virginia (BA)

Somers Farkas is an American entrepreneur, socialite, and diplomat who has served as the United States ambassador to Malta since 2025.

== Early life and education ==
Somers Farkas was born in Onancock in Virginia to Dr. Isaac Somers White and Caramine Kellam. She studied at Broadwater Academy and St Catherine's School. Farkas earned her bachelor's degree in communications from the University of Virginia.

== Career ==
She has worked as an active partner in a realty company and owned her own consulting firm, SW Farkas LLC. She has served as a trustee of the New York City Police Foundation. Before her appointment to the ambassadorship, she served on the President's Commission on White House Fellowships during Donald Trump's first presidency and as Northeast and Florida Regional Finance Director for Donald Trump's 2020 presidential campaign.

=== United States ambassador to Malta ===
Her nomination to become the U.S. ambassador to Malta under President Donald Trump was announced on December 24, 2024. She was confirmed by the Senate on October 7, 2025. She presented her credentials to President of Malta Myriam Spiteri Debono on November 26, 2025.

== Personal life ==
Farkas is married to Jonathan Farkas, an heir to department store Alexander's. Her mother-in-law is former United States ambassador to Luxembourg Ruth Farkas.

Both Farkas and her husband were briefly named in the Epstein files.
