= Joan M. Clark =

American diplomat (1922–2026)

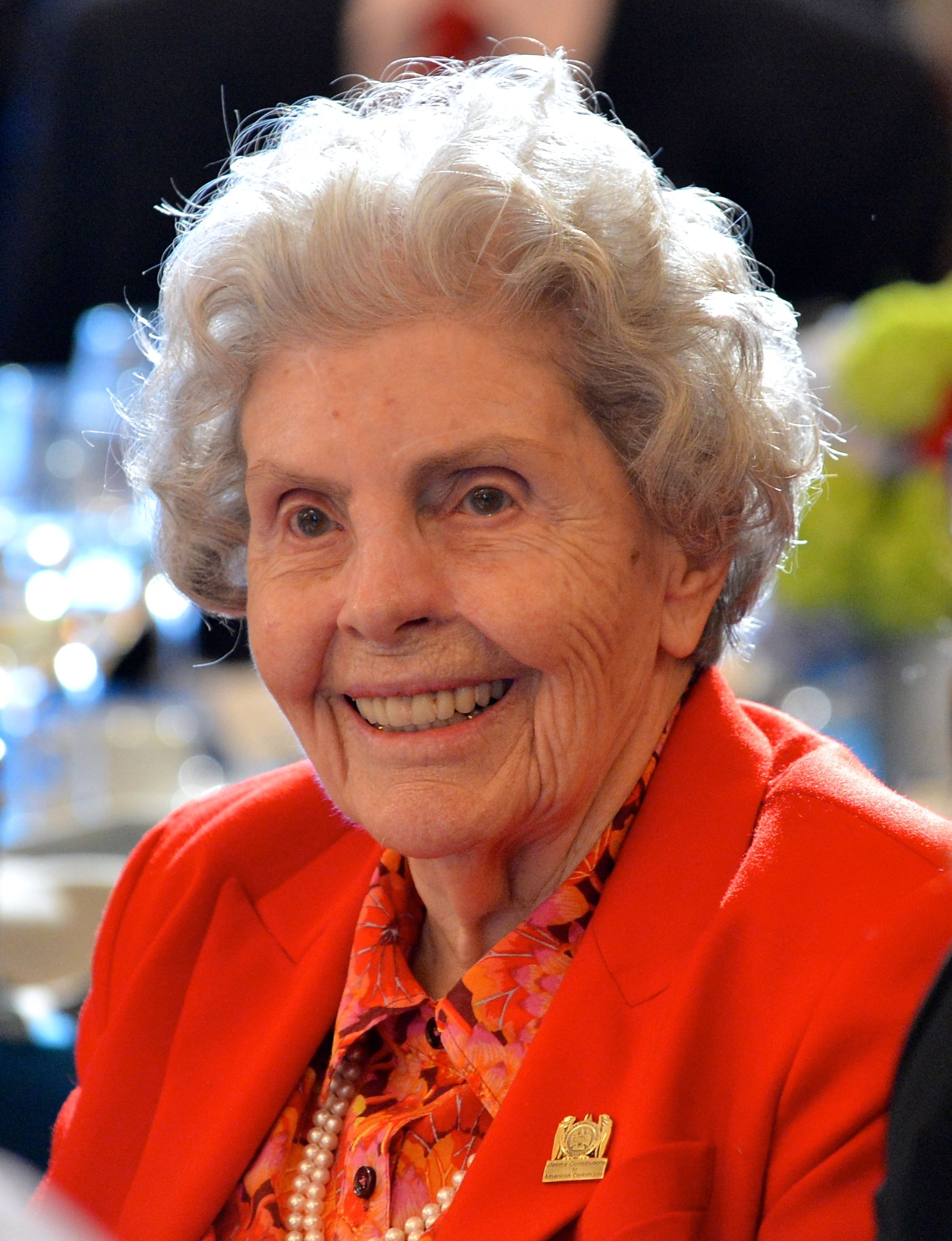
- Clark at an event marking the 90th anniversary of the U.S. Foreign Service in 2014

9th Assistant Secretary of State for Consular Affairs
- In office December 22, 1983 – October 18, 1989
- President: Ronald Reagan
- Preceded by: Diego C. Asencio
- Succeeded by: Elizabeth M. Tamposi

16th Director General of the Foreign Service
- In office July 27, 1981 – October 24, 1983
- President: Ronald Reagan
- Preceded by: Harry G. Barnes Jr.
- Succeeded by: Alfred Atherton

United States Ambassador to Malta
- In office March 21, 1979 – February 21, 1981
- Nominated by: Jimmy Carter
- Preceded by: Bruce Laingen
- Succeeded by: James Malone Rentschler

Personal details
- Born: March 27, 1922 Ridgefield Park, New Jersey, U.S.
- Died: October 11, 2026 (aged 104)

Joan Margaret Clark (March 27, 1922 – October 11, 2026) was an American diplomat who served as United States Ambassador to Malta between 1979 and 1981.

Born in Ridgefield Park, New Jersey, she was a member of the American Academy of Diplomacy. In 2007, Clark was presented the Lifetime Contributions to American Diplomacy Award by the American Foreign Service Association.

Clark left her post in Malta when she became Director General of the Foreign Service and Director of Personnel. She also served as Director of the Office of Management Policy (April 10, 1977 – March 20, 1979) and Assistant Secretary of State for Consular Affairs (1983–1989).

Clark died on October 11, 2026, at the age of 104.

== Sources ==
- Foreign Service Journal article on her Lifetime Contributions to American Diplomacy Award.

Diplomatic posts
Preceded by Bruce Laingen	United States Ambassador to Malta; March 26, 1979 – February 21, 1981	Succeeded by Frank P. Wardlaw (as Chargé d’Affaires ad interim); James Malone Rentschler
Government offices
Preceded by Diego C. Asencio	Assistant Secretary of State for Consular Affairs; December 22, 1983 – October 18, 1988	Succeeded by Elizabeth M. Tamposi
