= Douglas Kmiec =

American lawyer (born 1951)

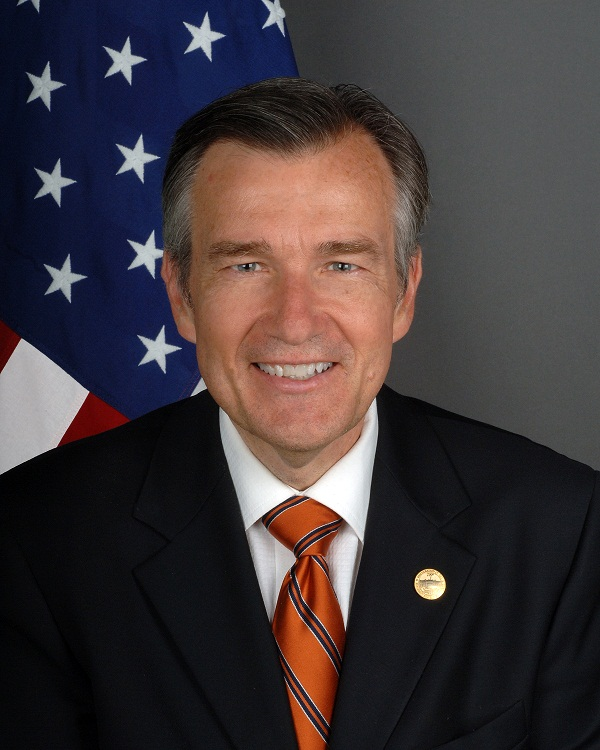

United States Ambassador to Malta
- In office August 31, 2009 – May 31, 2011
- President: Barack Obama
- Preceded by: Molly Bordonaro
- Succeeded by: Gina Abercrombie-Winstanley

United States Assistant Attorney General for the Office of Legal Counsel
- In office 1988–1989
- President: Ronald Reagan; George H. W. Bush
- Preceded by: Charles J. Cooper
- Succeeded by: William P. Barr

United States Deputy Assistant Attorney General for the Office of Legal Counsel
- In office 1985–1988
- President: Ronald Reagan
- Preceded by: Samuel Alito
- Succeeded by: J. Michael Luttig

Personal details
- Born: Douglas William Kmiec; September 24, 1951 (age 74)
- Party: Republican
- Education: Northwestern University (BA); University of Southern California (JD)

Douglas William Kmiec (/kəˈmɛk/; born September 24, 1951) is an American legal scholar, author, and former U.S. ambassador. He is the Caruso Family Chair and Professor of Constitutional Law at Pepperdine University School of Law. Kmiec came to prominence during the 2008 United States presidential election when, although a Republican, he endorsed Democrat Barack Obama. In July 2009, he was nominated by President Obama to serve as U.S. Ambassador to Malta. He was confirmed by the Senate and served for close to two years as ambassador to Malta. He resigned his post effective May 31, 2011.

== Education and career ==
Kmiec received his undergraduate degree with honors from Northwestern University in 1973 and his Juris Doctor (J.D.) from the University of Southern California in 1976. He was a member of the school's law review and was awarded the Legion Lex Commencement Prize for Legal Writing.

Kmiec was a member of the faculty at Valparaiso University School of Law, then taught at Notre Dame Law School from 1980 to 1999, with several leaves to serve in the Office of Legal Counsel for Presidents Ronald Reagan and George H. W. Bush. At Notre Dame, he directed the Thomas White Center on Law & Government and founded the Notre Dame Journal of Law, Ethics & Public Policy. From 2001 to 2003, Kmiec was the Dean and St. Thomas More Professor of the law school at the Catholic University of America. Following his Catholic University of America deanship, Kmiec assumed the endowed chair in constitutional law at Pepperdine University School of Law. Kmiec also teaches at the Pepperdine University School of Public Policy.

== Scholarship and legal thought ==
Kmiec has been a White House Fellow and a Distinguished Fulbright Scholar on the Constitution in Asia. His published works include The Attorney General's Lawyer (1992), three books on the American Constitution, a two-volume legal treatise, related books, and hundreds of published articles and essays. He is a frequent guest in the media on programs such as PBS's NewsHour, Meet the Press, and NPR, analyzing constitutional questions. He writes the Faith and Precedent column for the Catholic News Service.

When asked what it "mean[s] to teach within a Catholic framework", Kmiec responded:

Just consider the first year course in contracts. The Catholic emphasis of the study of this course explores not just how contracts are formed or what remedies exist for breach, but also the justice of keeping one's promises and paying a just or family wage, for example. By contrast, most law schools have become entirely utilitarian and consequentialist – believing that ends justify means – and they've cast aside first principles, the most prominent of which is the belief that moral reality can be known and understood by men and women. Although our students are not all Catholic, they all have a sincere desire to explore the relationship of faith and law, and to be of service through the legal profession.

=== Proposition 8 ===
Days before the arguments in front of the Supreme Court of California on Proposition 8, the amendment to the state constitution which recognizes marriage the union of man and woman, Kmiec and his colleague Shelley Ross Saxer, co-wrote an editorial in the San Francisco Chronicle. They opened by explaining "One of us (Saxer) opposed Prop. 8 for civil rights reasons; Kmiec supported it for reasons of religious liberty. Today, both of us believe the arguments in support of Prop. 8 fail each of these interests." They offer two reasons for "resisting" Proposition 8: 1) it could be read too broadly; 2) it ignores the different religious practices of the citizenry. "Marriage", they argue, "is of religious origin; it should remain there." Therefore, in order to retain the separation of church and state, they suggest that the state use consistent terminology for all couples, gay and straight, extending the same bundle of secular rights. If a couple wanted "marriage," Proposition 8 should prevent the state from dealing with the topic, which means it could again become the sole province of religious bodies. Of this view, Time wrote: "The Pepperdine idea puts into a play a new way of thinking — and whether it's part of the court's decision in the Prop 8 case or whether it makes its way into a new referendum, the idea of getting governments out of the marriage business offers a creative way of thinking about a problem that is otherwise likely to be around for a long, long time".

== 2008 U.S. presidential election and aftermath ==
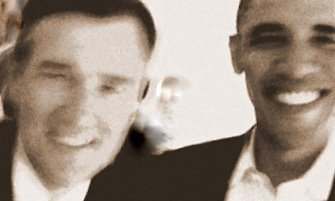
Kmiec and then-presidential candidate Barack Obama

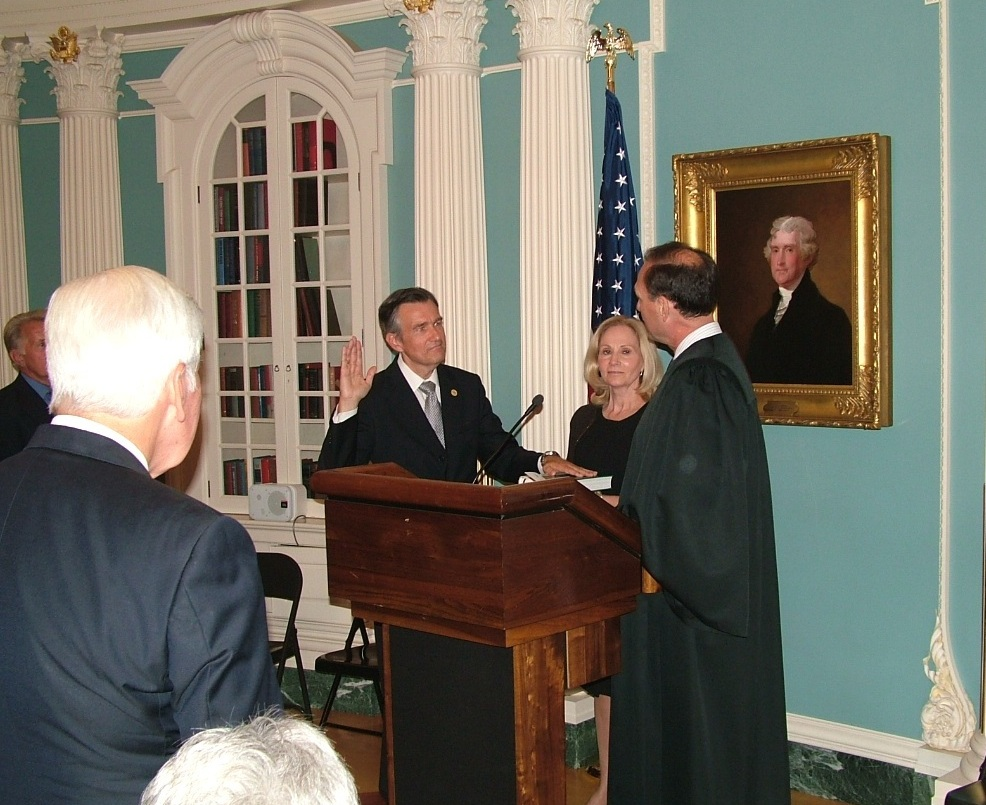
Kmiec being sworn into office as United States Ambassador to Malta by Justice Samuel Alito

Although he initially supported Republican Mitt Romney, Kmiec "caused a stir" when he endorsed Democrat Barack Obama in the 2008 presidential election in a piece on Slate. As he explained in an interview with the Chicago Tribune, "One of the things I kept discovering...was that Obama was sounding more Catholic than most Catholics I know." The issues that drew Kmiec's attention were wages, health care, and the cost of the Iraq War. To those fellow Catholics and abortion opponents who were surprised at his position, he argued that Obama's desire to "alleviate social conditions that correlate with abortion", such as poverty, was convincing. In the endorsement itself, Kmiec explained his disagreements with Obama, especially over the issue of abortion, but indicated that it was time to find common ground on this and other topics. Kmiec opened his piece by praising Obama's "integrity, intelligence, and genuine good will".

As a result of endorsing the pro-choice Obama, Kmiec was denied Communion in May 2008 at a Red Mass for Catholic business people in California. Kmiec confirmed the incident with Nina Totenberg, NPR's legal correspondent and E. J. Dionne of The Washington Post wrote a column noting how John Kerry and other Catholic public officials had been threatened with communion denial in 2004 because of their pro-choice position, but the first actual denial was experienced by Kmiec, a Catholic layman. After review, Cardinal Roger Mahony of the Roman Catholic Archdiocese of Los Angeles called the action "shameful and indefensible" and asked the priest to write a letter of apology to Kmiec.

In the midst of the election, Kmiec proceeded to write Can A Catholic Support Him?: Asking the Big Question About Barack Obama (2008) to explain his support for Senator Obama in light of Catholic principles. The book's introduction was written by West Wing actor Martin Sheen. Sheen and Kmiec did a series of radio and video commentaries for the Matthew 25 network in support of Obama. Kmiec also campaigned for the candidate as part of his "Faith, Family and Values Tour".

Obama was invited to speak at Notre Dame's commencement, which stirred controversy due to his pro-choice stance. Kmiec supported Obama speaking at the university and suggested to the administration that they use the speech as an opportunity to discuss the issues on which both sides of the abortion debate already agree: "we both respect life, we both view abortion as a moral tragedy".

After David Souter retired from the Supreme Court, Kmiec authored a lead article in the National Catholic weekly, America, making the case for "empathy" as a necessary value in the selection of a nominees for the high court.

== U.S. Ambassador to Malta ==
On July 2, 2009, President Obama nominated Kmiec as Ambassador to Malta. He was confirmed by the Senate. In April 2011, he was criticized by the Inspector General of the State Department for spending too much time on what the OIG reported as unofficial (religious) duties, which Kmiec saw as integral to his ambassadorial role. Joshua DuBois, special assistant to the president for faith-based initiatives, described the Kmiec nomination and appointment in precisely these terms, however, referring to a mandate (seemingly not considered by the OIG) as "the special presidential logic" of the appointment and its core mission. By contrast, the Inspector General saw the religious writing as "not directly related to his mission," writes Tiffany Stanley of The New Republic. Continues Stanley: "in the annals of diplomatic misbehavior, Kmiec's is rather an unusual case. Even the critical OIG report notes that embassy morale was good, he was respected by the Maltese and his staff, and had 'achieved some policy successes'. The problem, it seems, was that Kmiec may have taken the job a little too seriously." Columnist Tim Rutten of the Los Angeles Times writes: "Over the last few years, Kmiec has emerged as one of this country's most important witnesses to the proposition that religious conviction and political civility need not be at odds; that reasonable people of determined good conscience, whatever their faith or lack thereof, can find ways to cooperate in the common good. Though Kmiec has not sought their intervention, the president and the secretary of State ought to deal with the bureaucrats seeking to silence a voice whose only offense is to speak in the vocabulary of our own better angels." Kmiec did not ask the president to intervene, but instead expressing his continued confidence in the president's leadership, resigned effective May 31, 2011.

== Candidacy for Congress ==
In a January 2014 Facebook post, Kmiec declared himself an independent candidate for the U.S. House of Representatives from California's 26th congressional district, while simultaneously expressing his interest in running as the Democratic Party candidate for Vice-President of the United States in the event Hillary Clinton were to receive that party's presidential nomination. In his announcement, Kmiec declared the Democratic and Republican parties were "so deeply into the pockets of corporate donors for millions and millions of dollars that the thought of being responsive to the people has long since fallen from their memory." Kmiec explained his decision as being motivated by a desire to find a place he could do good while he still had the "energy and excitement of the ideas of social justice especially as they are now so well articulated by Pope Francis." The Chief political correspondent for the dominant paper in the district commented that "Douglas Kmiec may be the most interesting and most learned individual ever to run for Congress in Ventura County."

In the open primary, Kmiec won 2.3% of the vote and came in last place.

== Personal life ==
Kmiec was married to Carolyn Keenan in 1973 and together they had five children. The couple separated in 2011 and divorced in 2013.

One of Kmiec's sons, Keenan Kmiec, was reported in February 2025 as working as a lawyer for Elon Musk's Department of Government Efficiency (DOGE).

== See also ==
- Republican and conservative support for Barack Obama in 2008
- List of U.S. political appointments that crossed party lines

Diplomatic posts
Preceded by Molly H. Bordonaro	United States Ambassador to Malta; 2009–2011	Succeeded by Gina Abercrombie-Winstanley
