= Ministry for Foreign and European Affairs (Malta) =

Government ministry of Malta

Coordinates: 35°53′46″N 14°30′42″E

Ministry for Foreign and European Affairs and Trade
- Ministeru għall-Affarijiet Barranin u Ewropej u l-Kummerċ
- Coat of arms of Malta

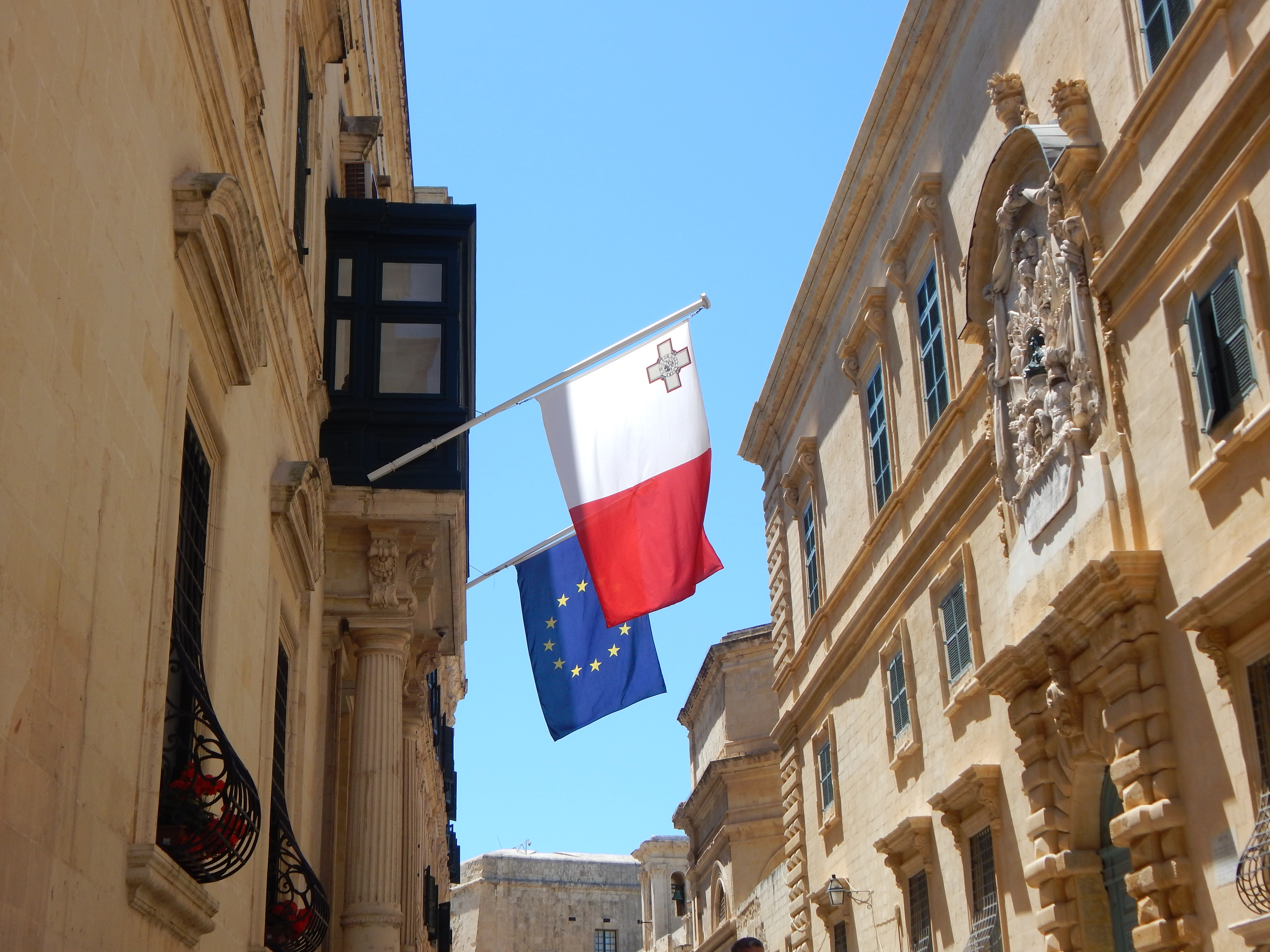
- Maltese and European Union flags at the headquarters of the ministry

Agency overview
- Jurisdiction: Malta and its diplomatic missions worldwide
- Headquarters: Palazzo Parisio, Merchant Street, Valletta, VLT 1171
- Agency executive: Chris Fearne, Minister of Foreign and European Affairs and Trade
- Website: foreignandeu.gov.mt

The Ministry for Foreign and European Affairs and Trade (Maltese: Ministeru għall-Affarijiet Barranin u Ewropej u l-Kummerċ) is responsible for maintaining Malta's external relations and the management of its international diplomatic missions. The current minister is Chris Fearne. The ministry is headquartered at Palazzo Parisio, a historic building situated on Merchants Street in Valletta.

== History ==
Malta attained full independence from the United Kingdom in 1964 and has maintained independent, official diplomatic relations with other nations since then. The ministry moved to its current location, within the Palazzo Parisio, in 1973, although the building itself was built in the 1700s and was once occupied by Napoleon Bonaparte during his invasion of Malta, as part of the Egyptian campaign. The Palazzo Parisio has housed certain government operations starting in 1886 with Malta's General Post Office and, after World War I, the nation's Audit Office.

== Diplomacy ==
The ministry oversees Malta's affairs with foreign entities, including bilateral relations with individual nations and its representation in international organizations, including the European Union, the United Nations and the Council of Europe. The ministry also holds responsibility for matters related to foreign trade, expatriates, citizenship and travel visas.

The Holy See's apostolic nuncio is always listed first in Malta's Order of Precedence of foreign ambassadors and other heads of mission, regardless of the incumbent nuncio's time in office. The nuncio is then followed by a traditional precedence based on the foreign representatives' length of appointment.

Several foreign missions to Malta, including those to large nations like Brazil and Japan, are accredited to it through embassies in Rome, Italy. There are no Maltese diplomatic missions physically located in South America.

=== Libya ===
In 2011 and 2012, the ministry was involved in international efforts to address the Libyan civil war, in part because of Malta's geographic proximity to Libya and the history of refugees and illegal immigrants leaving Libya for Malta.

Refugee camps and the handling of matters of immigration and visitor status are the responsibility of the ministry. Foreign Minister Borg has called for Libya's National Transitional Council to accede to the Geneva Convention, something the African nation had not previously done under Muammar Gaddafi's regime.

== See also ==
- List of diplomatic missions of Malta
- List of diplomatic missions in Malta
