= Molly Bordonaro =

American diplomat

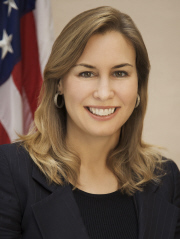

United States Ambassador to Malta
- In office September 7, 2005 – February 6, 2009
- President: George W. Bush
- Preceded by: Anthony H. Gioia
- Succeeded by: Douglas Kmiec

Personal details
- Born: Molly Bordonaro Portland, Oregon, U.S.
- Party: Republican
- Education: University of Colorado

Molly Bordonaro is managing partner of The Green Cities Company, formerly Gerding Edlen, and the former American ambassador to Malta (2005–09).

Bordonaro was born in Portland, Oregon. She earned an undergraduate degree from University of Colorado.

She began working at Gerding Edlen in 2009, and was made managing partner in 2017. She is also a member of the board of directors for Moda Health and the National Women's History Museum. She is also a member of the Pension Real Estate Association, Technology and Sustainability Affinity Group, on the board of National Association of Real Estate Investment Managers and on the advisory board for commercial real estate at University of Colorado.

She ran for Congress on the Republican ticket in 1998 from Oregon's 1st congressional district but lost to David Wu. She was the Chairman of the Northwest Region for the 2004 Bush-Cheney Campaign.

In 2009, at the end of her service as ambassador to Malta, Bordonaro was awarded the Medal of Merit by Maltese president Edward Fenech-Adami. She is the first American ambassador, and only the third in history, to receive the honor.
