= Constance J. Milstein =

American attorney and diplomat (born 1946)

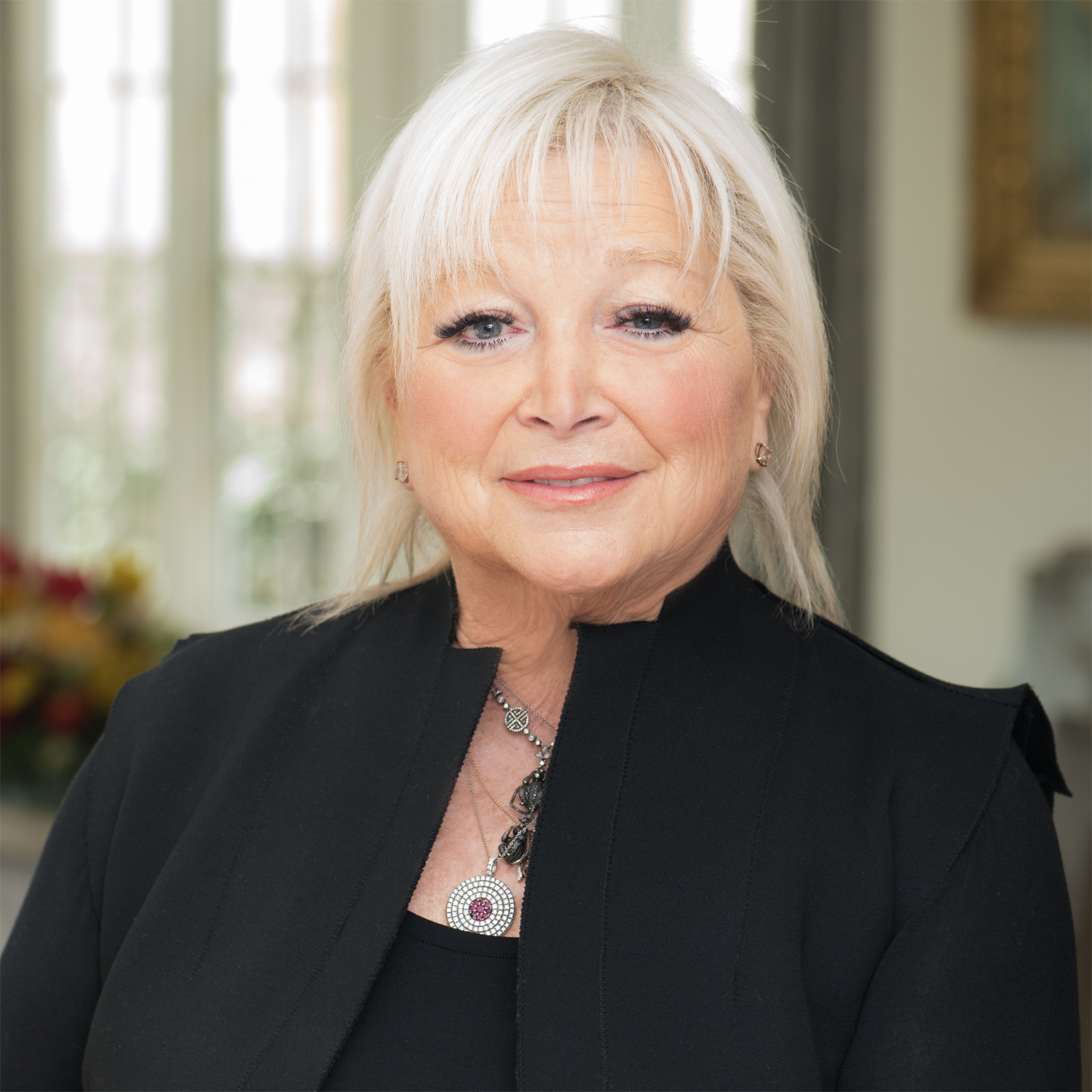
- Milstein in 2016

United States Ambassador to Malta
- In office October 27, 2022 – January 20, 2025
- President: Joe Biden
- Preceded by: G. Kathleen Hill (2018)
- Succeeded by: Somers Farkas

Personal details
- Born: August 1946 (age 80)
- Education: New York University (BS); North Carolina Central University (JD)

Constance Jane Milstein (born August 1946) is an American attorney and businesswoman who served as the United States ambassador to Malta from 2022 to 2025.

== Early life and education ==
Constance Jane Milstein was born in August 1946, the daughter of Seymour Milstein. She earned her Bachelor of Science from New York University and her Juris Doctor from North Carolina Central University.

== Career ==
She co-founded Ogden CAP Properties, LLC. She has an extensive history of advocating for veterans and active military members; She is a founding board member of Blue Star Families, as well as founding Dog Tag bakery, which helps disabled veterans. Milstein has worked with several groups surrounding geopolitical issues and relations, including the School of Diplomacy and International Relations at Seton Hall University, United Nations Association, Refugees International, and UN Watch.

=== Obama administration ===
During the Obama administration, Milstein served as an aide to the Secretary of the Army.

=== United States ambassador to Malta ===
On December 8, 2021, President Joe Biden nominated Milstein to be the ambassador to Malta. Hearings on her nomination were held before the Senate Foreign Relations Committee on May 4, 2022. The committee favorably reported the nomination on May 18, 2022. The Senate confirmed her nomination on August 6, 2022, by a 57–34 vote. She presented her credentials to President George Vella on October 27, 2022.

== Awards and recognitions ==
Milstein has won several awards, including the Angel Award from Blue Star Families; she has also won the Distinguished Service Award from the New York University College of Arts & Science and the Albert Gallatin Medal from there as well.

== Personal life ==
Milstein speaks French and Italian.

Diplomatic posts
Preceded by Gwendolyn S. Green; Charge d'Affaires	United States Ambassador to Malta; 2022–2025	Succeeded by Somers Farkas
