= Gina Abercrombie-Winstanley =

American diplomat (born 1957)

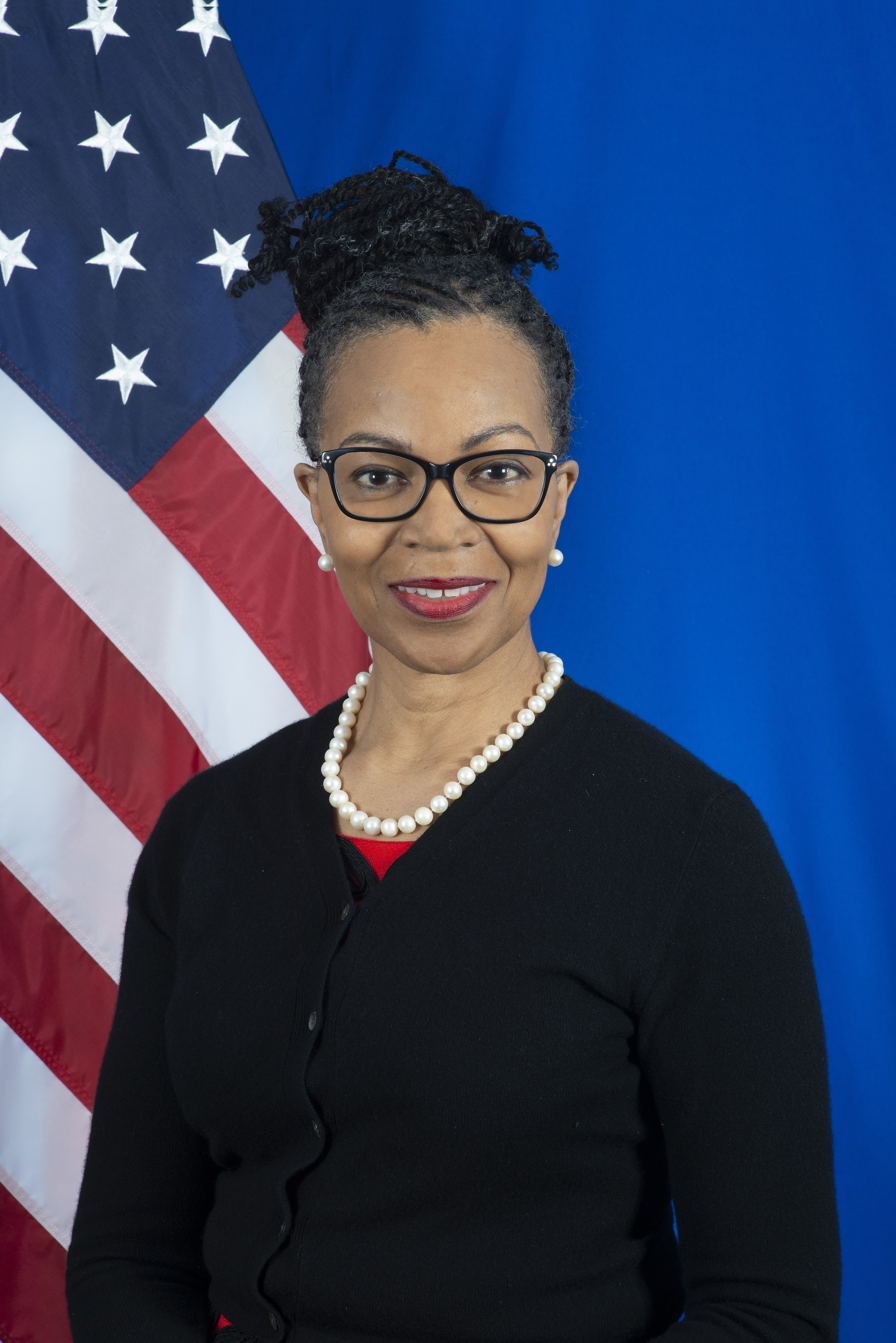

Chief Diversity and Inclusion Officer of the United States Department of State
- In office April 12, 2021 – June 30, 2023
- President: Joe Biden
- Preceded by: Position established

United States Ambassador to Malta
- In office May 2, 2012 – January 26, 2016
- President: Barack Obama
- Preceded by: Douglas Kmiec
- Succeeded by: G. Kathleen Hill

Personal details
- Born: Gina Kay Abercrombie; 1957 (age 68–69) Cleveland Heights, Ohio, U.S.
- Spouse: Gerard Winstanley (m. 1982)
- Children: 2
- Education: George Washington University (BA); Johns Hopkins University (MA)

Gina Kay Abercrombie-Winstanley (born 1957) is an American diplomat who served as U.S. ambassador to Malta from 2012 to 2016. She was nominated by President Barack Obama and confirmed on March 29, 2012. She was sworn in on April 18, 2012, and presented her credentials to George Abela, President of Malta, on May 2, 2012. On April 12, 2021, she was sworn in to serve as chief diversity and inclusion officer for the United States Department of State.

== Early life and education ==
Abercrombie-Winstanley was born Gina Kay Abercrombie in Cleveland Heights, Ohio, where her mother was a secretary and her father an attorney. She graduated from Cleveland Heights High School and participated in an international exchange program in Israel. She then attended George Washington University, where she earned a Bachelor of Arts degree. She also earned a Master of Arts degree in international relations from Johns Hopkins University.

== Career ==
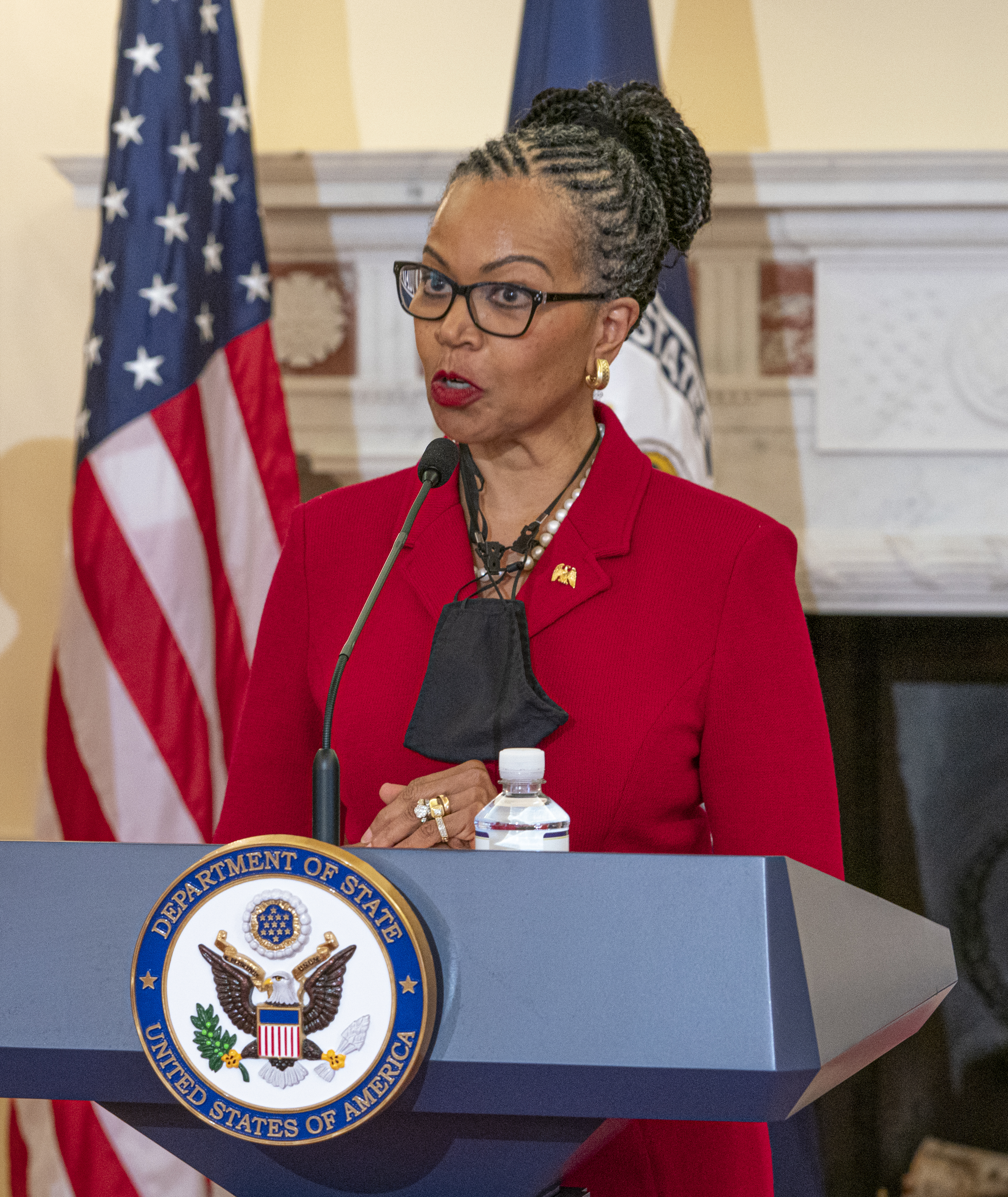
Abercrombie-Winstanley speaks in 2021

After completing her studies, Abercrombie-Winstanley joined the Peace Corps as a volunteer in Oman.

Abercrombie-Winstanley joined the United States Foreign Service in 1985 and was posted to Baghdad, Iraq. She then went on to serve at the U.S. embassies in Jakarta, Indonesia and Cairo, Egypt. She returned stateside to become a Special Assistant for Middle Eastern and African Affairs to Deputy Assistant Secretary of State Lawrence Eagleburger (1991–1993). After a year of intensive Arabic language training in Tunisia, Abercrombie-Winstanley then became a political officer at the U.S. Embassy in Tel Aviv, Israel (1994–97), focusing on Israel–Palestine relations. from 1997 to 1998 she was assigned to the Senate Foreign Relations Committee.

From 1998 to 2000, she served in roles with the United States National Security Council, serving as director for the Arabian Peninsula with the Near East South Asia Center and later as director of legislative affairs.

Abercrombie-Winstanley served as consul general in Jeddah, Saudi Arabia from 2002 to 2005. She was the first female consul general in that location. While there, she survived an al-Qaeda attack on the consulate on December 6, 2004, and was cited "for acts of courage" during the attack. From 2005 to 2006, she served as director of Middle East Area studies in the Foreign Service Institute, and then spent two years as director for Egypt, Syria, Lebanon and Jordan at the Bureau of Near Eastern Affairs. From 2008 to 2012, she was deputy coordinator for counterterrorism.

In 2012, President Barack Obama nominated her to become U.S. ambassador to Malta. She served in that role from May 2, 2012, to January 26, 2016.

Abercrombie-Winstanley was sworn in on April 12, 2021, to serve under Secretary Antony Blinken as chief diversity and inclusion officer for the United States Department of State

== Personal life ==
Abercrombie-Winstanley married Gerard A. Winstanley in 1982, and they have two adult children.

== Honors and awards ==
Recipient of Senior Performance Pay, Meritorious and Superior Honor Awards, including "For acts of courage during an attack on the U.S. Consulate General, Jeddah, Saudi Arabia on December 6, 2004, by al-Qa'ida terrorists." Foreign Policy for America's Community Leadership Award, Peace Corp Woman of Achievement and Distinguished Alumna of both Johns Hopkins University and George Washington University.

Diplomatic posts
Preceded by Douglas Kmiec	United States Ambassador to Malta; 2012–2016	Succeeded by G. Kathleen Hill
