= National Pasta Association =

American trade association

- Logo 2018
- Abbreviation: NPA
- Formation: 1904; 122 years ago
- Headquarters: National Press Building; Suite 750; Washington, D.C., United States
- Website: www.ilovepasta.org

The National Pasta Association (NPA) is a trade association of professionals in the United States pasta industry. The NPA originally formed as The National Association of Macaroni and Noodle Manufacturers of America in 1904, making it one of the oldest trade associations in the United States.

== History ==
The first commercial pasta plant in the United States was founded in 1848 in Brooklyn, New York. By the turn of the century, the pasta industry had reached a growth point that triggered a large group of industry members to assemble in Pittsburgh for a discussion of manufacturing and marketing issues. The result of this meeting was the establishment of the National Macaroni Manufacturers Association. In 1981, the name was changed to the National Pasta Association.

== Mission statement ==
- Increase the consumption of pasta
- Promote the development of sound public policy
- Act as a center of knowledge for the industry and the consumer

== Committees ==
- Communications
- Government Affairs
- History
- Technical Affairs

== Presidents ==
- 1904–1905 Thomas H. Toomey
- 1919–1921 James T. William
- 1922–1928 Henry Mueller
- 1928–1930 Frank J. Tharinger
- 1930–1932 Frank L. Zerega
- 1932–1933 Alfonso Gioia
- 1941–1948 C. W. Jack Wolfe
- 1950–1952 C. Frederick Mueller
- 1952–1959 Thomas A. Cuneo
- 1968–1970 Vincent DeDomenico
- 1978–1980 Paul A. Vermylen
- 1980–1982 Lester R. Thurston Jr.
- 1983–1992 Joseph M. Lichtenberg
- 1992–2000 Jula J. Kinnaird

== Publications ==
- The New Macaroni Journal from May 1919 (volume 1, number 1) until December 1923 (volume 5, number 8)
- The Macaroni Journal from January 1924 (volume 5, number 9) until December 1984 (volume 66, number 8)
- Pasta Journal from January 1985 (volume 1, number 1) until April 2000, when the publication was discontinued.
