= James Malone Rentschler =

American diplomat

James Malone Theodore Rentschler (October 16, 1933 Rochester, Minnesota - May 2007 Paris, France) was an American Career Foreign Service Officer who was Ambassador to Malta. He succeeded Joan M. Clark who was named Director General of the Foreign Service.

== Education ==
Rentschler received a certificate from the University of Paris in 1954, graduated from Yale University in 1955, and received a master's degree from Johns Hopkins University.

== Career ==
From 1955 until 1958, Rentschler was a military linguist with the U.S. Army Security Agency before joining the Foreign Service in 1959.

He became a senior staff member in 1978. That year, he was posted as Director of West European Affairs on the National Security Council under the Carter administration, and continued in the Reagan administration. Reagan appointed him Ambassador to Malta (1982 until April 1985). While there, he was asked to head the Summit Public Diplomacy Inter-Agency Team. He was appointed Ambassador to Guinea in 1986 but the nomination was withdrawn on September 11, 1986, before the Senate could act on it.

== Publications ==
- A Reason to Get Up in the Morning: A Cold Warrior Remembers Publisher Estate of James M. Rentschler, 2008 ISBN 055701753X, 9780557017539
