= Kathryn Linda Haycock Proffitt =

American businesswoman and diplomat

- Born: 1951 (age 74–75)
- Known for: U.S. Ambassador to Malta. Under President Clinton 1998 to 2001.

Kathryn Linda Haycock Proffitt (born 1951) was an American non-career appointee who served as the ambassador extraordinary and plenipotentiary to Malta from 1998 until 2001.

== Early life and education ==
Proffitt attended Portland State University and graduated in 1972 from the University of Oregon Dental School. In 1973, she completed postgraduate training in restorative dentistry at the University of Washington School of Dentistry.

== Career ==
Proffitt began her career as a registered dental hygienist in Toppenish, Washington, and was the acting director of Dental Hygiene at Yakima Valley College.

Call-America, a telecommunications company, was founded by Proffitt in 1982. She was president and executive officer at the company. She was also vice chairman of the Competitive Telecommunications Association (CompTel) and director of ICG Communications, Inc.

Proffitt served as the U.S. Ambassador to the Republic of Malta from January 1998 to March 2001. She was nominated by President Clinton in September 1997 and confirmed by the Senate in November.
