= List of diplomatic missions in Malta =

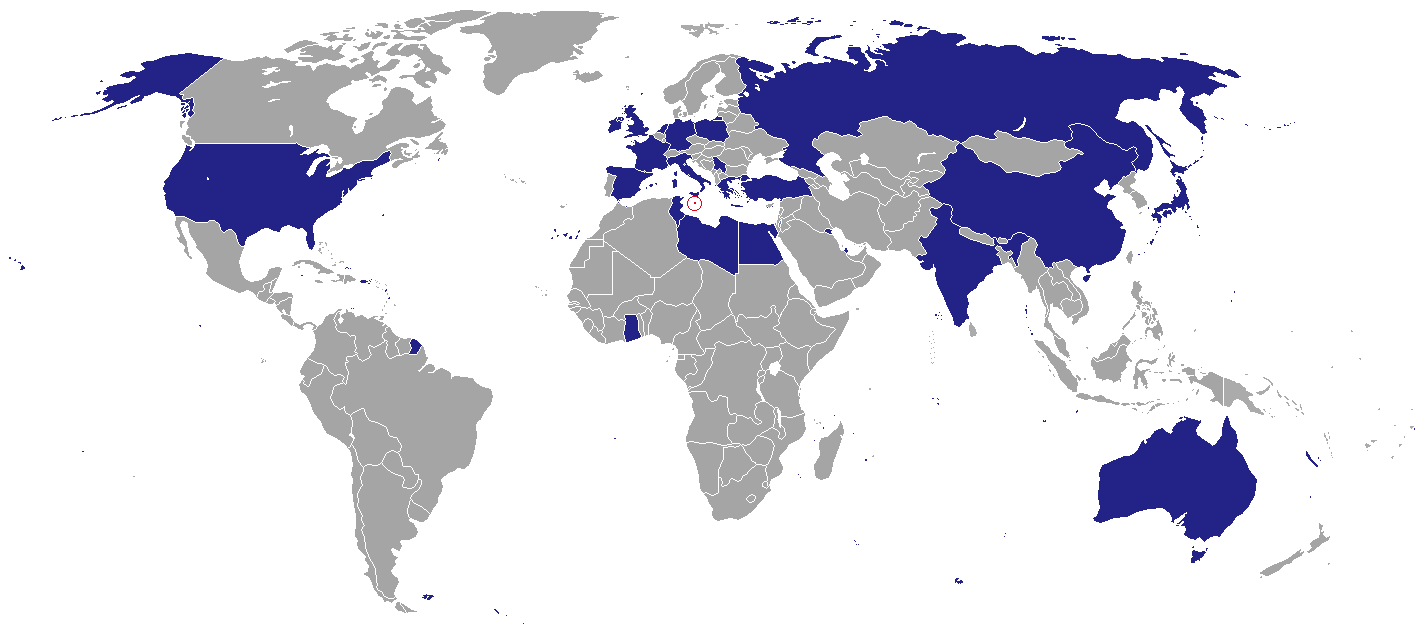
Map of diplomatic missions in Malta

This article lists embassies and consulates posted in Malta. There are currently 26 embassies/high commissions in Malta.

Several other countries have non resident embassies.

== Embassies/High Commissions in Malta ==
Country	Mission type	Location	Year opened	Photo
Australia	High Commission	Ta' Xbiex	1967	
China	Embassy	St. Julian's	1972	
Egypt	Embassy	Ta' Xbiex	1973	
France	Embassy	Valletta	1965	-
Germany	Embassy	Ta' Xbiex	1966	
Ghana	High Commission	Sliema	2019	-
Greece	Embassy	Ta' Xbiex	2004	
Holy See	Apostolic Nunciature	Rabat	1966	
Hungary	Embassy Office	Valletta	2018	-
India	High Commission	Birkirkara	1993	-
Ireland	Embassy	Ta' Xbiex	2005	
Italy	Embassy	Ta' Xbiex	1964	
Japan	Embassy Office	Sliema	2024	-
Kuwait	Embassy	Balzan	2012	
Libya	Embassy	Balzan	1984	
Netherlands	Embassy	Ta' Xbiex	1974	
Palestine	Embassy	Swieqi	1974	-
Poland	Embassy	Santa Venera	2023	-
Qatar	Embassy	Swieqi	2021	-
Russia	Embassy	San Ġwann	1966	
Serbia	Embassy Office	Floriana	2022	-
Sovereign Military Order of Malta	Embassy	Valletta	1966	
Spain	Embassy	Ta' Xbiex	1969	
Tunisia	Embassy	Ħ'Attard	1991	-
Turkey	Embassy	Floriana	2010	
United Kingdom	High Commission	Ta' Xbiex	1964	
United States	Embassy	Ta' Qali	1964	

== Non-resident embassies / high commissions accredited to Malta ==
=== Resident in Athens, Greece ===
1. Bangladesh
2. Nigeria
3. Thailand

=== Resident in London, United Kingdom ===
1. Antigua and Barbuda
2. Bahamas
3. Barbados
4. Botswana
5. Eswatini
6. Iceland
7. Lesotho
8. Liberia
9. Malawi
10. Namibia
11. Rwanda
12. Seychelles

=== Resident in Madrid, Spain ===
1. Gambia
2. Guinea
3. Nepal
4. New Zealand

=== Resident in Rome, Italy ===
1. Albania
2. Algeria
3. Angola
4. Argentina
5. Armenia
6. Azerbaijan
7. Bahrain
8. Belarus
9. Belgium
10. Bosnia and Herzegovina
11. Brazil
12. Bulgaria
13. Burundi
14. Canada
15. Cape Verde
16. Chile
17. Colombia
18. Costa Rica
19. Croatia
20. Cuba
21. Cyprus
22. Czechia
23. Denmark
24. Dominican Republic
25. Ecuador
26. El Salvador
27. Estonia
28. Ethiopia
29. Finland
30. Georgia
31. Guatemala
32. Hungary
33. Indonesia
34. Iran
35. Iraq
36. Ivory Coast
37. Kazakhstan
38. Kenya
39. Kosovo
40. Latvia
41. Lebanon
42. Lithuania
43. Luxembourg
44. Malaysia
45. Mauritania
46. Mexico
47. Moldova
48. Monaco
49. Mongolia
50. Montenegro
51. Mozambique
52. Nicaragua
53. North Korea
54. North Macedonia
55. Norway
56. Oman
57. Panama
58. Paraguay
59. Peru
60. Philippines
61. Portugal
62. Romania
63. Saudi Arabia
64. Senegal
65. Serbia
66. Slovakia
67. Slovenia
68. South Africa
69. South Korea
70. Sri Lanka
71. Switzerland
72. Tanzania
73. Uganda
74. Ukraine
75. United Arab Emirates
76. Uruguay
77. Uzbekistan
78. Venezuela
79. Vietnam
80. Zambia

=== Resident in Tripoli, Libya ===
1. Burkina Faso
2. Mali
3. Sudan
4. Yemen

=== Resident elsewhere ===
1. Andorra (Andorra la Vella)
2. Austria (Vienna)
3. Cambodia (Paris)
4. Israel (Jerusalem)
5. Jordan (Tunis)
6. Laos (Geneva)
7. Pakistan (Tunis)
8. San Marino (City of San Marino)
9. Sierra Leone (Cairo)
10. Sweden (Stockholm)
11. Togo (Paris)

== Former embassies/High Commissions ==
- Austria
- Belgium
- Portugal
- Sierra Leone

== See also ==
- Foreign relations of Malta
- Visa requirements for Maltese citizens
