= Massimiliano Palinuro =

Italian Catholic bishop and Apostolic Vicar of Istanbul

The Most Reverend Massimiliano Palinuro
- Apostolic Vicar of Istanbul
- Church: Catholic Church
- Appointed: 14 September 2021
- Predecessor: Rubén Tierrablanca González

Orders
- Ordination: 24 April 1999 by Gennaro Pascarella
- Consecration: 7 December 2021 by Leonardo Sandri

Personal details
- Born: 10 June 1974 (age 52) Ariano Irpino, Italy
- Education: Pontifical Biblical Institute, Pontifical Theological Seminary of Southern Italy
- Motto: Deus caritas est
- Coat of arms

Massimiliano Palinuro (born 10 June 1974) is an Italian-born Turkish Roman Catholic prelate who has served as Apostolic Vicar of Istanbul since 2021. He is also Apostolic Administrator of the Greek Catholic Apostolic Exarchate of Istanbul. He was appointed by Pope Francis on 14 September 2021 and consecrated a bishop on 7 December 2021.

== Early life and education ==
Palinuro was born in Ariano Irpino, in the Province of Avellino, Italy, on 10 June 1974. At the age of 16 he began his formation at the minor seminary of the Archdiocese of Benevento. In 1993 he entered the Cardinal Alessio Ascalesi Archiepiscopal Seminary in Naples.

He was ordained a deacon in 1998 and subsequently sent to Rome to study at the Pontifical Biblical Institute, where he obtained a licentiate in Sacred Scripture. He later obtained a doctorate in biblical theology from the Pontifical Theological Faculty of Southern Italy.

== Priesthood ==
Palinuro was ordained a priest for the Diocese of Ariano Irpino-Lacedonia on 24 April 1999 by Bishop Gennaro Pascarella. He was appointed parish vicar of the Shrine of Our Lady of Fatima in Ariano Irpino. In 2000 he became parish priest of the Santissima Annunziata parish in San Nicola Baronia.

From 2004 he taught New Testament studies and New Testament Greek philology at the Pontifical Theological Faculty of Southern Italy and taught Sacred Scripture there from 2001 to 2011.

=== Ministry in Turkey ===
In 2011 Palinuro was sent to Turkey as a fidei donum priest. He initially served in the Archdiocese of Izmir and subsequently in the Apostolic Vicariate of Anatolia. He served as parish priest in Trabzon and became involved in pastoral and biblical work in the Turkish Catholic community. In 2019 he collaborated on the revision of the Gospels and the Acts of the Apostles in Turkish.

== Episcopate ==
On 14 September 2021, Pope Francis appointed Palinuro Apostolic Vicar of Istanbul and Apostolic Administrator of the Greek Catholic Apostolic Exarchate of Istanbul. At the time of his appointment he was serving as a fidei donum priest of the Diocese of Ariano Irpino-Lacedonia and parish priest in Trabzon.

His episcopal ordination took place on 7 December 2021 in the Cathedral Basilica of Ariano Irpino. Leonardo Sandri, then Prefect of the Congregation for the Oriental Churches, was the principal consecrator, with Sergio Melillo, Bishop of Ariano Irpino-Lacedonia, and Paolo Bizzeti, Apostolic Vicar of Anatolia, serving as principal co-consecrators. He was installed as Apostolic Vicar of Istanbul on 18 December 2021.

The episcopal ordination was attended by numerous Catholic bishops and representatives of other Christian communities. In his homily and subsequent remarks, Palinuro described his new assignment as a demanding missionary mission and expressed gratitude to his family and to the Church for entrusting him with the office.

== See also ==
- Catholic Church in Turkey
- Apostolic Vicariate of Istanbul
