= Episcopal Conference of Turkey =

Assembly of Catholic bishops

Episcopal Conference of Turkey is the committee meeting of the Catholic bishops in Turkey of the various ritual churches. It is a member of the Council of European Episcopal Conferences (CCEE), and a guest member of the Southeast European Bishops' Conferences.

== Catholics in Turkey ==
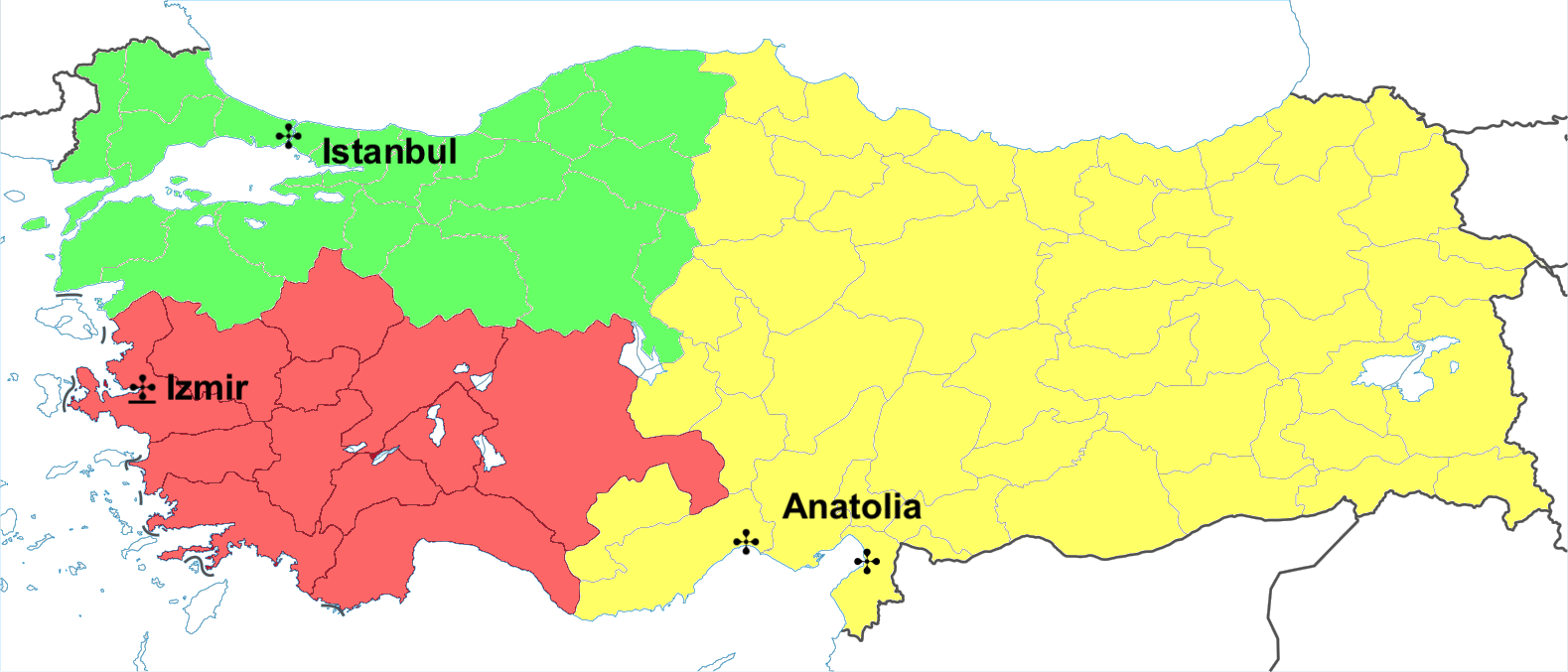
Latin rite dioceses in Turkey

The Catholics make up 33,500 of the 130,000 Christians in Turkey. The vast majority are members of the Oriental Orthodox Churches, with smaller number beings members of the Eastern Orthodox Church and even fewer Evangelical Protestants. The Roman Catholics or Latin-Rite Catholics are represented by apostolic vicars in Istanbul and Iskenderun and an archbishop in Izmir. The Armenian Catholics have an archbishop in Istanbul, the Syriac Catholics have an Patriarchal Exarch in Istanbul, the Chaldean Catholics have an archbishop in Diyarbakir, and the Greek Catholics have an apostolic exarch in Istanbul.

- Roman Catholic: 20,000
- Chaldean Catholic: 8,000–48,594
- Armenian Catholic: 3,500
- Syriac Catholic: 2,000
- Greek Catholic: less than 50

== Members of the Episcopal Conference ==
The Catholic Bishops' Conference of Turkey members include:

- Chairman of the Bishops' Conference: Archbishop Yusuf Sag, Patriarchal Vicar of the Syriac Catholic Church in Turkey
- Vice Chair: Bishop Kevork Khazoumian, Coadjutor Bishop of Archeparchy of the Istanbul Armenian Catholic Church in Turkey
- Archbishop Ruggero Franceschini, Archbishop and Metropolitan of Izmir
- Archbishop Louis Pelâtre, AA, Apostolic Vicar of Istanbul and Ankara
- Reverend Mar Francois Yakan, the Apostolic Administrator of the Chaldean Catholic Church in Turkey

== Commissioner for Human Rights ==
At the request of the Turkish bishops' conference was Dr. Otmar Oehring (Mission "missionary" in Aachen) to advocate for the Catholic churches in Turkey, appeal. In this role he sits on the European Episcopal Conferences (CCEE) and the European institutions for their interests and rights.

== Chairmen ==
- Georges Antoine Dubois, OFMCap, Apostolic Vicar of Istanbul (1979–1989)
- Giuseppe Germano Bernardini, OFMCap, Archbishop of Izmir (1989–1992)
- Hovhannes Tcholakian, Archbishop of Istanbul (1992–1994)
- Louis Pelâtre, AA, Apostolic Vicar of Istanbul (1994–2002)
- Ruggero Franceschini, OFMCap, Archbishop of Izmir (2002–2007)
- Luigi Padovese, OFMCap, Apostolic Vicar of Anatolia (2007–2010)
- Ruggero Franceschini, OFMCap, Archbishop of Izmir (since 2010)

== See also ==
- Christianity in Turkey
- Freedom of religion in Turkey

== Sources ==
- "The Eastern Catholic Churches 2016. Source: Annuario Pontificio" (PDF). CNEWA. 2016. pp. 3–4. Archived from the original (PDF) on 2016-10-20.
