= Antuan Ilgit =

Antuan Ilgit S.J.
- Auxiliary Bishop of the Apostolic Vicariate of Anatolia
- Church: Catholic Church
- Appointed: 28 August 2023

Orders
- Ordination: 26 June 2010 by Giovanni Lajolo
- Consecration: 25 November 2023 by Paolo Bizzeti

Personal details
- Born: 22 June 1972 (age 54) Hersbruck, Germany
- Education: Gazi University; Pontifical Gregorian University; Pontifical Oriental Institute; Pontifical Lateran University; St. Joseph's University; Boston College
- Motto: Senin Himayen Altında; Under Your Protection
- Coat of arms

Antuan Ilgit, S.J. (born 22 June 1972) is a Turkish-Italian prelate of the Catholic Church who has served as an auxiliary bishop for the Vicariate of Anatolia since 2023 and as apostolic administrator since 2024. A member of the Jesuits, he has been vicar general and chancellor of that vicariate since 2022. He completed his priestly formation and education in Italy and the United States. His research focuses on bioethics and examines disability, sexual morality and interreligious dialogue with Islam.

== Biography ==
Antuan Ilgit was born on 22 June 1972 in Hersbruck, Germany, to a family of Turkish immigrants and raised a Muslim. His father was a fisherman and his mother a homemaker. He moved with his family to Turkey as a child and was raised in Mersin. Though fluent in several languages, he does not know German. He entered university planning on a career in government administration or teaching. In 1994 he received a four-year degree in Public Administration from the Faculty of Economics and Administrative Sciences at Gazi University in Ankara.

After completing his degree he performed his military service in Ankara and there in 1995 began to explore the Christian faith. He converted to Catholicism from Islam in 1997. Speaking of his Muslim heritage in 2010, he said:

My conversion was a refinement of my faith. The Islamic part of my path is very important for me because the Lord revealed himself to me in the Islamic faith, in faith in the One God. This is how he drew close to me. I will not give up on this part of my life, Christianity is the next step, it is the culmination of the previous path which as a whole I consider to be a real gift.

After exploring his vocation with the Order of Friars Minor Capuchin in Emilia-Romagna for several years, on 1 November 2005 he entered the Jesuit novitiate in Genoa, Italy. He made his first vows in Padua in 2007 and was ordained a deacon on 18 April 2009 in Venice. He was ordained a priest on 26 June 2010 at the Church of the Gesù in Rome by Cardinal Giovanni Lajolo. (Note: His ordination followed closely upon the assassination of the Apostolic Vicar of Anatolia, Bishop Luigi Padovese, in Iskenderun on 3 June 2010.) He celebrated his first Mass a week later at the Church of Saint Teresa of Lisieux in Ankara. He is the first Jesuit to hold Turkish citizenship. Since 2013 he has dual citizenship, Turkish and Italian.

He earned a bachelor's degree in theology at the Pontifical Gregorian University in 2008. He did a year of studies at the Pontifical Oriental Institute and obtained a licentiate in moral theology with a focus on bioethics at the Alphonsian Academy of the Pontifical Lateran University in 2011. His thesis "A Comparison between Issues Related to the Beginning of Life in Turkish Bioethics and the Teaching of the Catholic Church" considered issues regarding abortion, contraception, IVF, and the use of embryonic stem cells based on research analyzing Turkish laws regulating biomedical research, statements of the Union of Turkish Medical Association, and the decisions and studies of the Presidency of Religious Affairs of Turkey.

He received a master's degree in healthcare ethics from Saint Joseph's University in Philadelphia in 2013.

He earned his doctoral degree in moral theology at Boston College School of Theology and Ministry in 2017 with a dissertation entitled "Muslim and Catholic Perspectives on Disability in the Contemporary Context of Turkey: A Proposal for Muslim-Christian Dialogue". While studying there, he participated in the Fellowships at Auschwitz for the Study of Professional Ethics (FASPE) program, an interdisciplinary engagement in contemporary ethics. He also assisted at St. Leonard's Parish in Boston's traditionally Italian North End neighborhood.

His assignments have included stints as assistant to the parish priest of the Turkish-speaking Catholic community of Meryemana (Ankara) while serving as bursar of the Jesuit community in 2010-2011; animator, formator and spiritual father at the Pontifical Interregional Seminary of the Campania Region in Naples from 2017 to 2020; and lecturer in moral theology and bioethics at the Pontifical Theological Faculty of Southern Italy from 2017 to 2023. From September 2020 to April 2021, he did his final year of Jesuit formation in Salamanca, Spain. He spent the next year in Iskenderun, the headquarters of the vicariate of Anatolia, and in 2022 he became vicar general and chancellor of the vicariate of Anatolia, as well as the national coordinator for youth and vocational pastoral care of the Turkish Episcopal Conference. Following the earthquake in Turkey and Syria of 6 February 2023 that destroyed the cathedral and much of İskenderun, he organized relief services in cooperation with the other local Christian communities.

On 19 November 2022, he made his final vows as a Jesuit in Ankara. In July 2023, he led a group of Turkish students to participate in World Youth Day in Lisbon, where they met with Pope Francis. He has met Pope Francis on several other occasions, once serving as translator when the pope met with Turkish President Recep Tayyip Erdoğan.

Pope Francis named him titular bishop of Tubernuca and auxiliary bishop of the Vicariate of Anatolia on 28 August 2023. He is the first Turk named a bishop since the papal nuncio Julio Murat in 2012.

He received his episcopal consecration on 25 November in the Basilica of St. Anthony of Istanbul. He was named apostolic administrator of the vicariate in 2024.

== Publications ==
- Muslim and Catholic Perspectives on Disability: A Proposal for Muslim-Christian Dialogue. Libra Kitap. 2017. ISBN 978-605-2380-07-9.
