= Yusuf Sağ =

Retired chorbishop

Yusuf Sağ (born 1934 in İdil, Şırnak, Turkey) is the Syriac Catholic chorbishop, who served as the Patriarchal Exarch of the Syriac Catholic Patriarchal Exarchate of Turkey since 1991 until his retirement on 2 July 2017.

== Life ==
After primary studies, Yusuf Sağ studied philosophy and theology in Beirut and received his ordination to the priesthood on 14 February 1964. He was pastor from 1964 to 1970 in Mardin and Diyarbakir, a NATO base.

In 1985 he was appointed patriarchal vicar and in 1987 he was appointed chorbishop, a priest with episcopal dignity.

In 1991 Sağ was appointed patriarchal exarch in Turkey.

=== Titles as clergyman ===
Yusuf Sağ was Syriac Catholic Patriarchal Exarchate of Turkey, based in Istanbul, previously Mardin. He was a member of the Turkish Catholic Bishops' Conference as a representative of the unified Syriac Catholic Church and president of the Commission for Interreligious Dialogue. Yusuf Sağ to time was the only Turkish cleric of the Catholic Church in Turkey.
