= Stenia gens =

Ancient Roman family

The gens Stenia or Stennia, occasionally spelled Sthenia, was a minor plebeian family at ancient Rome. Hardly any members of this gens are mentioned in ancient writers, but a large number are known from inscriptions.

== Origin ==
The nomen Stenius is simply a gentilicial form of the Oscan praenomen Sthenius, and is thus a patronymic surname. In a few inscriptions it occurs as Sthenius, but in most examples the 'h' is omitted. Many of the Stenii found in epigraphy came from Samnium and adjacent, Oscan-speaking regions of central and southern Italy.

== Praenomina ==
The Stenii used a variety of common praenomina, chiefly Lucius, Gaius, Publius, and Gnaeus. At least two of them bore the more distinctive praenomen Numerius, which was common in gentes of Oscan origin, but relatively scarce at Rome.

== Members ==
This list includes abbreviated praenomina. For an explanation of this practice, see filiation.

- Stenia, the wife of Aulus and mother of Marcia, named in an inscription from Clusium in Etruria.
- Sthenius, a noble citizen of Thermae Himeraeae in Sicilia, who espoused the side of the Marians during the war with Sulla. When Sulla's general, Pompeius, proposed to punish the city, Sthenius saved his fellow citizens by taking full responsibility, and was pardoned. Later, when Thermae was plundered by Verres, Sthenius intervened; Verres then charged him with various crimes, for which the punishment was death; but he was protected, and served as a witness at Verres' trial.
- Gaius Stenius, named in a sepulchral inscription from Aufinum in Sabinum, dating to the late first century.
- Numerius Stenius M. f., one of the magistri of Mercury, Apollo, and Neptune at Ortygia in Achaia, who made an offering to Hercules in 113 BC.
- Lucius Stennius Anneius Africanus, a child buried at Beneventum in Samnium, aged eleven years, eight months, and eleven days, with a monument from his parents, dating from the second century, or the first half of the third.
- Quintus Stenius Augurinus, an eques at Patavium in Venetia and Histria.
- Stenius Callicras Gaudentius, buried at Clusium, aged seventy-two years, eight months, and ten days, along with his wife, Lucia Fonteia Concordia, aged seventy, in a tomb dedicated by their children, grandchildren, and freedmen.
- Publius Stennius Candidus, an infant buried at Carthage in Africa Proconsularis, aged eight months, eight days.
- Stenius Castelanius Aureolus, buried in a fourth-century tomb at Rome, along with his wife, Florentia.
- Lucius Stennius Clementius, one of the patrons of a guild at Ostia in Latium, in AD 262. Also named among the patrons was a Lucius Stennius Secundus.
- Titus Stennius T. f. Co[...]mo, buried in a third-century tomb at Telesia in Samnium, aged twenty-one, with a monument from his father, Titus Stennius Severus.
- Lucius Sthenius Creticus, dedicated a sepulchre for himself and his family at Salona in Dalmatia, dating to the first century, or the first half of the second.
- Gaius Stennius Crispus, a priest in the service of Jupiter Optimus Maximus at Neapolis in Campania, during the middle portion of the second century.
- Lucius Stenius Cytisus, the freedman of Silvinus, was one of the Seviri Augustales at Casinum in Latium, named in an inscription dating to the first or second century, along with Rubria Arura, perhaps his wife.
- Gnaeus Stennius Cn. f. Egnatius Primus, the son of Gnaeus Stennius Egnatius Rufus, was one of the quattuorvirs at Acerrae in Campania, whose donation of one hundred sestertii was recorded in an inscription dating to the early or middle part of the third century.
- Gnaeus Stennius Egnatius Rufus, the father of Gnaeus Stennius Egnatius Primus, the quattuorvir at Acerrae.
- Stennia Faustina, dedicated a monument at Asseria in Dalmatia to her brother, Titus Publicius Saturninus, dating to the early or middle part of the second century.
- Stenius Felix, named among the wealthy inhabitants of Ligures Baebiani in Samnium, whose estate was valued at two hundred thousand sestertii in AD 101.
- Stenius Flavianus, a member of a veterans' association at Lambaesis in Numidia.
- Stenius Fortis, a freedman who dedicated a tomb at Salona for the freedwoman Lupula, dating to the third century, or the late second.
- Stenia Fortunata, buried at Rome, with a monument from her husband, Gaius Valerius Polybius.
- Publius Stennius Gemellus, a soldier in the fifth cohort of the Praetorian Guard, dedicated a second-century tomb at Rome for his fellow soldier, the eques Lucius Antonius Satinus, aged twenty-four years, having served for eight years.
- Stenius Hermes, buried at Salona, in a tomb dedicated by his wife, Charite, dating from the third century, or the latter half of the second.
- Publius Stenius P. l. Hylas, a freedman buried in a first-century tomb at Obulco in Hispania Baetica.
- Gaius Stenius Jan[...], a maker's mark found on a piece of pottery from Lugdunum in Gallia Lugdunensis.
- Stenius Lupulus, dedicated a tomb at Salona to his wife, Julia Fabrica, dating to the third century, or the latter half of the second.
- Marcus Stennius Marcellinus, a member of the senate of Cumae in Campania in AD 251.
- Stennia Potita, buried at Cirta in Numidia, along with Lepidius Nampulus, in the sepulchre of the Lepidii, dating to the middle of the third century.
- Stenia C. f. Prima, buried in a family sepulchre at Minturnae in Latium, along with Gaius Stenius Primus, probably her father.
- Stenia C. f. Primula, named in a sepulchral inscription from Aquinum in Latium.
- Gaius Stenius Primus, buried in a family sepulchre at Minturnae, along with Stenia Prima, probably his daughter.
- Stennia Pyramis, the wife of Lucius Stennius Silvester, with whom she dedicated a second-century tomb at Telesia for their son, Lucius Stenius Rufinus.
- Stenius Quartio, named in an inscription from Tubernuca in Africa Proconsularis.
- Lucius Stenius L. f. Rufinus, a young man of equestrian rank, buried at Telesia, aged sixteen years, six months, and nine days, in a second-century tomb dedicated by his parents, Lucius Stennius Silvester and Stennia Pyramis.
- Publius Stenius Rufus, a decurion named in a first-century inscription from Rome, along with the freedwoman Plosurnia Salvilla.
- Publius Stenius P. l. Salvius, a freedman named in an inscription from Luceria in Apulia, dating from the first half of the first century.
- Numerius Stenius Saturninus, named along with his wife, Petronia Philsia, in an inscription from Beneventum, dating from the early or middle part of the first century.
- Stenia Secunda, buried in a third century tomb at Puteoli in Campania, aged forty-four years, ten months, and ten days, with a monument from her husband, whose name has not been preserved.
- Lucius Stennius Secundus, one of the patrons of a guild at Ostia in AD 262. Also among the patrons was a Lucius Stennius Clementius.
- Stenia Secura, buried at Salona, in a tomb built by her husband, Lucius Publicius Trophimus, dating to the third century, or the latter half of the second.
- Gnaeus Stenius Securus, buried at Tragurium in Dalmatia, with a monument from Stenia, perhaps his daughter, dating from the third century, or the latter half of the second.
- Stenia Severa, buried in a third-century tomb at Ammaedara in Africa Proconsularis, aged forty, with a monument from her husband, Allius Fortunatus.
- Titus Stennius Severus, dedicated a third-century tomb at Telesia for his son, Titus Stennius Co[...]mo.
- Lucius Stenius Silvanus, named in a testamentary inscription from Casinum, dating to AD 65 or 66.
- Lucius Stennius Silvester, one of the Seviri Augustales at Telesia, together with his wife, Stennia Pyramis, dedicated a second-century tomb for their son, Lucius Stennius Rufinus.
- Sextus Stenius Stratus, one of the Seviri Augustales at Narona in Dalmatia, honoured in an inscription dating to the first or second century.
- Stenius Tacitus, buried at Salona, in a tomb built by his wife, Byrria Lupula, dating to the third century, or the latter half of the second.
- Lucius Stenius L. l. Thelgo, a freedman buried in a first-century tomb at Casinum.
- Stenia Tyche, buried at Salona, along with her husband, Lucius Aselius Halemus, in a tomb dedicated by their daughter, Aselia Lucida, dating to the third century, or the latter half of the second.
- Sthenia Veneria, buried at Clusium, aged twenty-seven, with a monument from her husband, Gaius Sentius Aulax, to whom she had been married for five years, six months, and four days.

== See also ==
- List of Roman gentes

== Bibliography ==
- Marcus Tullius Cicero, In Verrem.
- Lucius Mestrius Plutarchus (Plutarch), Lives of the Noble Greeks and Romans.
- Dictionary of Greek and Roman Biography and Mythology, William Smith, ed., Little, Brown and Company, Boston (1849).
- Theodor Mommsen et alii, Corpus Inscriptionum Latinarum (The Body of Latin Inscriptions, abbreviated CIL), Berlin-Brandenburgische Akademie der Wissenschaften (1853–present).
- Giovanni Battista de Rossi, Inscriptiones Christianae Urbis Romanae Septimo Saeculo Antiquiores (Christian Inscriptions from Rome of the First Seven Centuries, abbreviated ICUR), Vatican Library, Rome (1857–1861, 1888).
- Bullettino della Commissione Archeologica Comunale in Roma (Bulletin of the Municipal Archaeological Commission of Rome, abbreviated BCAR), (1872–present).
- Gustav Wilmanns, Inscriptiones Africae Latinae (Latin Inscriptions from Africa, abbreviated ILAfr), Georg Reimer, Berlin (1881).
- René Cagnat et alii, L'Année épigraphique (The Year in Epigraphy, abbreviated AE), Presses Universitaires de France (1888–present).
- August Pauly, Georg Wissowa, et alii, Realencyclopädie der Classischen Altertumswissenschaft (Scientific Encyclopedia of the Knowledge of Classical Antiquities, abbreviated RE or PW), J. B. Metzler, Stuttgart (1894–1980).
- Rendiconti della Classe si scienze morali, storiche e filologiche dell'Academia dei Lincei (Reports of the Class of Moral, Historical and Philological Sciences of the Accademia dei Lincei, abbreviated RAL), G. Bardi, Rome (1922–1940).
- La Carte Archéologique de la Gaule (Archaeological Map of Gaul, abbreviated CAG), Académie des Inscriptions et Belles-Lettres (1931–present).
- Anna and Jaroslav Šašel, Inscriptiones Latinae quae in Iugoslavia inter annos MCMXL et MCMLX repertae et editae sunt (Inscriptions from Yugoslavia Found and Published between 1940 and 1960, abbreviated ILJug), Ljubljana (1963–1986).
