= Daniel Duranti =

Italian Catholic priest

Daniel Duranti (1633 – 1712 or 1713) was an Italian Catholic priest, mostly known for serving as Archbishop of the Roman Catholic Diocese of Skopje and Apostolic Vicar of Roman Catholic Archdiocese of İzmir.

Duranti was born in Arezzo, on 17 September 1633, and ordained priest on 8 March 1664. On 11 December 1690 he was appointed Archbishop of the Diocese of Skopje (ordained Bishop in 1691), position which had remained empty since the death of Pjetër Bogdani. He served in that position until 29 July 1702, when he resigned. Simultaneously, during 7 June 1696 – 1706 and 1708–1713, he served as Vicar Apostolic of the Roman Catholic Archdiocese of İzmir. He died from a plague epidemic together with circa 10,000 people in İzmir, most probably in 1712.

== See also ==
- Catholic Church in Turkey
