= Apostolic Prefecture of Mardin =

Former Latin Catholic jurisdiction in the Ottoman Empire

The Apostolic Prefecture of Mardin was a short-lived Latin Church missionary pre-diocesan jurisdiction of the Catholic Church centered in Mardin, in southern Asian Turkey.

== History ==
It was established on 1842.08.30 as Apostolic Prefecture of Mardin alias of Mesopotamia, on territory split off from the then Apostolic Prefecture of Syria and Cicilia, and run by Capuchins. Circa 1909, it was suppressed without former successor jurisdiction.

== Ordinaries ==
(all Latin Church)

Apostolic Prefects of Mardin

- Father Giuseppe da Burgos, OFMCap (1842–1845)
- Nicola da Barcellona, OFMCap (1845–1873)
- Donato da Guardiagrele, OFMCap (1873–1879)
- Giovanni Antonio Zucchetti, OFMCap (1879 – 1909.12.22), later Metropolitan Archbishop of İzmir (Smyrna, Asian Turkey) (1909.12.22 – 1920.03.08), emeritate as Titular Archbishop of Trapezus (1920.03.08 – death 1931.06.01)

== See also ==
- Catholic Church in Turkey

== Source and External links ==
- GCatholic with incumbent bio links
