= Ruggero Franceschini =

Italian Catholic archbishop (1939–2024)

His Excellency Ruggero Franceschini
- Archbishop Emeritus of Izmir
- Archdiocese: Izmir
- Appointed: 11 October 2004
- Term ended: 7 November 2015
- Predecessor: Giuseppe Germano Bernardini
- Successor: Lorenzo Piretto
- Previous posts: Apostolic Vicar of Anatolia and Titular Bishop of Sicilibba (1993–2004)

Orders
- Ordination: 11 August 1963 by Beniamino Socche
- Consecration: 3 October 1993 by Achille Silvestrini

Personal details
- Born: 1 September 1939 Prignano sulla Secchia, Italy
- Died: 30 December 2024 (aged 85) Reggio Emilia, Italy

Ruggero Franceschini, OFMCap (1 September 1939 – 30 December 2024) was an Italian archbishop of the Roman Catholic Church.

== Biography ==
Ruggero Franceshini was born in Prignano sulla Secchia, Italy, on 1 September 1939. He entered the Order of Friars Minor Capuchin and made his vows in 1960. He was ordained a priest of that order on 11 August 1963.

On 2 July 1993, he was appointed apostolic vicar of Anatolia and titular bishop of Sicilibba, North Africa. He received his episcopal consecration on 3 October 1993 from Cardinal Achille Silvestrini, Prefect of the Congregation for the Oriental Churches.

On 11 October 2004, he was named Archbishop of İzmir. Shortly after arriving in İzmir, a police car that a deranged man had stolen struck him crossing the road. He spent months in the hospital and was left with a limp. He hired a Turkish lawyer and waited years for a resolution. He later connected it to other attacks he viewed as part of an anti-Christian campaign.

On 12 June 2010, he was given the additional responsibility of apostolic administrator of the Apostolic Vicariate of Anatolia following the murder of Bishop Luigi Padovese. He did not accept the official explanation that Padovese had been the victim of a single mentally disturbed man. He connected it to other attacks and called it the work of "ultranationalists and religious fanatics".

During his tenure, he worked to make St. John's Cathedral accessible to all. On 29 September 2013, it was reopened after major restoration work.

On 7 November 2015, Pope Francis accepted his resignation as archbishop and named Lorenzo Piretto to succeed him.

Franceschini died on 30 December 2024, at the age of 85.

After the funeral, celebrated on 2 January 2025 in the parish church of Sant'Antonino in Casalgrande, he was buried in the local cemetery.

Catholic Church titles
Preceded by Giuseppe Germano Bernardini	Archbishop of Izmir; 2004–2015	Succeeded by Lorenzo Piretto
Preceded by Juozas Matulaitis	Titular Bishop of Sicilibba; 1993–2004	Succeeded by Joseph Thomas Konnath
Preceded by Giuseppe Germano Bernardini	Apostolic Vicar of Anatolia; 1993–2004	Succeeded by Luigi Padovese
