= Nusratiye Mosque =

Mosque in Mersin, Turkey

Coordinates: 36°48′02″N 34°37′59″E

- Turkish: Nusratiye Camii
- Location within Turkey

Religion
- Affiliation: Islam
- Ecclesiastical or organizational status: Church (1870s-1985); Mosque (1985-present)
- Status: Active

Location
- Location: Mersin
- Country: Turkey
- Interactive map of Nusratiye Mosque

Architecture
- Type: Church architecture Mosque architecture
- Style: Maronite; Ottoman
- Founder: Maronites from Lebanon and Syria

Nusratiye Mosque (Turkish: Nusratiye Camii), formerly Mersin Maronite Church Turkish: (Mersin Maruni Kilisesi), is a historic Maronite Catholic church from the 1870s that has been converted into a mosque in the southern Turkish city of Mersin.

The church was built in 1876 by Maronite Christians from Lebanon and Syria, who were fleeing the 1860 civil conflict in Mount Lebanon and Damascus. However, in the 1950s, the priest was killed by a lightning strike, forcing the Maronite community to travel to Lebanon for a new leader. According to Şinasi Develi, the priests in Lebanon said that that the Maronite community of 300 people was too small to support a priest, and therefore they returned without one. The church was donated to the state on the condition that the building be used for religious purposes, and the church bell was installed in the Roman Catholic Church of St. Anthony, where the Maronites in the city then held their services. By 1971, only 150 Maronites remained in the city.

The Maronite church was originally a long-nave parish church with two entrances. Its floor plan was rectangular. In 1985, the building was converted into a mosque, and in 1986 an apartment for the imam was added to the upper floor. A vestibule and toilets were added to the north facade, and one doorway was converted into a mihrab.
