= Apostolic Vicariate of Istanbul =

Roman Catholic missionary jurisdiction in Turkey

Coordinates: 41°02′41″N 28°59′07″E

Apostolic Vicariate of Istanbul Vicariatus Apostolicus Istanbulensis İstanbul Havarisel Vekilliği

Location
- Country: Turkey
- Metropolitan: Holy See

Statistics
- Population: (as of 2020); 17,000
- Parishes: 12

Information
- Rite: Latin Rite
- Cathedral: Cathedral of the Holy Spirit

Current leadership
- Pope: Pope Leo XIV
- Apostolic vicar: Massimiliano Palinuro

Map

The Apostolic Vicariate of Istanbul (Latin: Vicariatus Apostolicus Istanbulensis) is a Roman Catholic apostolic vicariate with its see in Istanbul, Turkey. Its territory encompasses the northwestern region of the country, and is immediately subject to the Holy See. The current Vicar Apostolic is Msgr Massimiliano Palinuro.

== History ==
- April 15, 1742: Established as Apostolic Vicariate of Constantinople
- November 30, 1990: Renamed as Apostolic Vicariate of Istanbul

Prior to the construction of the Cathedral of the Holy Spirit in 1846, the Vicariate had its seat at different locations in Pera. Notably, between 1802 and 1854, the Church of the Holy Trinity (which was then a Latin church under Austrian protection) served as the cathedral for the Latin Catholic community and the residence of the Apostolic Vicars.

== Ecumenical relations ==
Despite the small number of Christians currently living in Turkey, the region's rich Christian heritage, and the fact that it is still the seat of the primus inter pares of the Orthodox Church, makes it an important staging ground for ecumenical relations and dialogue.

In an interview with pontifical foundation Aid to the Church in Need, before Pope Leo XIV's visit to Turkey, the Apostolic Vicar Massimiliano Palinuro described these relations as follows: "The Catholic community in Turkey, particularly in Istanbul, inspired by the rich history of these lands, possesses immense potential to help build bridges of fraternity in a country that has long stood as a crossroads between East and West. Here, especially in daily life and everyday interactions, we are called to dismantle the walls built by centuries-old prejudices and ideological hostilities. This is a true preparatio evangelica—a preparation for the Gospel—that unfolds through both the beauty and the challenges of human relationships."

In the same interview he went on to say that: "Here in Istanbul, ecumenical relations are definitely much stronger than anywhere else in the world."

== Special churches ==
=== Cathedral ===
Cathedral of the Holy Spirit

=== Minor basilicas ===
- Basilique Saint Antoine de Padoue (Basilica of Saint Anthony of Padua)

=== Other churches ===
- Church of St. Mary Draperis, Istanbul
- Church of SS Peter and Paul, Istanbul
- Church of Saint Benoit, Istanbul
- Our Lady of Lourdes Church, Istanbul
- St. Teresa's Catholic Church, Ankara

== Leadership ==
Apostolic Vicariate of Constantinople

Erected: 15 April 1742, Latin Name: Constantinopolitanus

- Gaspar Gasparini, O.F.M. Conv. (31 May 1677 – 22 August 1705, died)

...

- Antonio Balsarini (26 August 1730 – 2 January 1731, died)
- Francesco Girolamo Bona (18 June 1731 – 16 February 1750, died)
- Blaise Paoli (18 March 1750, Appointed – )

...

- Giuseppe Roverani (10 March 1767 – 2 July 1772, died)
- Giovanni Battista Bavestrelli (31 August 1772 – 20 April 1777, died)
- Francesco Antonio Fracchia (26 September 1778 – 21 October 1795, died)
- Julio Maria Pecori, O.F.M. Ref. (21 October 1795 – 28 February 1796, died)
- Nicolao Lorenzo Timoni (3 June 1796, appointed, did not take effect)
- Giovanni Battista Fonton, O.F.M. Conv. (16 March 1799 – 26 August 1816, died)
- Binkentios Coressi (26 August 1816 – 7 March 1835, died)
- Julien-Marie-François-Xavier Hillereau (7 March 1835 – 1 March 1855, died)

...

- Leopoldo Angelo Santanchè, O.F.M. (13 November 1874 – 3 April 1876, appointed Archbishop (Personal Title) of Fabriano e Matelica)
- Vincenzo Vannutelli (23 January 1880 – 22 December 1882, appointed Apostolic Internuncio to Brazil)
- Luigi Rotelli (26 January 1883 – 23 May 1887, appointed Apostolic Nuncio to France)

...

- Vincenzo Sardi di Rivisondoli (10 April 1908 – 10 June 1914, resigned)

...

- Gauthier Pierre Georges Antoine Dubois, O.F.M. Cap. (15 November 1974 – 29 May 1989, died)
- Antuvan Marovitch (29 May 1989 – 15 December 1991, died)

Apostolic Vicariate of Istanbul

Name Changed: 30 November 1990

- Louis Pelâtre, A.A. (9 July 1992 – 16 April 2016, retired)
- Rubén Tierrablanca Gonzalez, O.F.M. (16 April 2016 – 22 December 2020, died)
  - Lorenzo Piretto, O.P., Archbishop, Apostolic Administrator (24 December 2020 – 13 September 2021)
- Massimiliano Palinuro (14 September 2021 – present)

== See also ==
- Catholic Church in Turkey
- Bulgarian Catholic Apostolic Vicariate of Constantinople
- Roman Catholic Apostolic Vicariate of Anatolia
- Roman Catholic Archdiocese of İzmir
