= Rubén Tierrablanca González =

Mexican-born Turkish Catholic bishop (1952–2020)

Rubén Tierrablanca González OFM
- Vicar Apostolic of Istanbul
- Church: Catholic Church
- See: Apostolic Vicariate of Istanbul
- In office: 16 April 2016 – 22 December 2020
- Predecessor: Louis Pelâtre
- Successor: Massimiliano Palinuro
- Other posts: Titular Bishop of Tubernuca (2016-2020); Apostolic Administrator of Istanbul (2016-2020)

Orders
- Ordination: 29 June 1978
- Consecration: 11 June 2016 by Leonardo Sandri

Personal details
- Born: 24 August 1952 Cortazar, Guanajuato, Mexico
- Died: 22 December 2020 (aged 68) Istanbul, Turkey

Rubén Tierrablanca González (24 August 1952 – 22 December 2020) was a Mexican-born Turkish Catholic bishop.

Tierrablanca González was born in Mexico. He was ordained to the priesthood in 1978. He served as titular bishop of Tubernuca and as vicar apostolic of the Apostolic Vicariate of Istanbul and apostolic administrator of the Greek Catholic Apostolic Exarchate of Istanbul from 2016 until his death in office in 2020.

He died in Istanbul, at age 68, from COVID-19 during the COVID-19 pandemic in Turkey after being hospitalized for three weeks in intensive care.
