= Giuseppe Germano Bernardini =

Italian Roman Catholic archbishop (1928–2023)

His Excellency Giuseppe Germano Bernardini
- Archbishop Emeritus of İzmir
- Installed: 22 January 1983
- Term ended: 11 October 2004
- Predecessor: Domenico Caloyera
- Successor: Ruggero Franceschini
- Other post: Apostolic Administrator of Asia Minor (1983–1990)
- Previous post: Superior of Trabzon (1966–1983)

Orders
- Ordination: 21 March 1953
- Consecration: 9 April 1983 by Bruno Foresti

Personal details
- Born: 27 September 1928 Pavullo nel Frignano, Italy
- Died: 3 December 2023 (aged 95) Reggio Emilia, Italy

Giuseppe Germano Bernardini, OFMCap (27 September 1928 – 3 December 2023) was an Italian prelate of the Catholic Church who worked as a missionary in Muslim-majority countries from 1957 to 2004 and served as Archbishop of İzmir, Turkey, from 1983 to 2004.

== Biography ==
Giuseppe Germano Bernardini was born in Verica, a village in Pavullo nel Frignano, Italy, on 27 September 1928, the son of Sergio and Domenica Bernardini, both declared "Venerable" by Pope Francis in 2015. He was ordained a priest of the Order of Friars Minor Capuchin on 21 March 1953.

His career as a missionary in Muslim countries began in 1957. On 19 December 1966 he was named Ecclesiastical Administrator of Trabzon. On 22 January 1983, Pope John Paul II appointed him Archbishop of İzmir. He received his episcopal consecration on 9 April from Archbishop Bruno Foresti.

When the Vicariate of Anatolia was erected from the jurisdiction he once led as the Trabzon Mission on 30 November 1990, he was named Apostolic Administrator.

Bernardini chaired the Episcopal Conference of Turkey from 1989 to 1992. On 13 October 1999, addressing a meeting of the Synod of Bishops, the 2nd Special Assembly for Europe, he warned that Islam was intent on dominating Christian Europe. He said: "The 'domination' has already started with petrodollars, used not to create jobs in poor countries in North Africa and the Middle East, but to build mosques and cultural centers in Christian countries ... including Rome, center of Christianity". He advised especially against allowing Muslims to use Christian churches for their services. He called interfaith meetings with Muslims "a dialogue of the deaf". He retired on 11 October 2004 upon the appointment of his successor, Ruggero Franceschini.

Bernardini died in Reggio Emilia on 3 December 2023, aged 95.

Catholic Church titles
Preceded by Domenico Caloyera	Archbishop of İzmir; 1983–2004	Succeeded by Ruggero Franceschini
Preceded by —	Apostolic Administrator of Asia Minor; 1983–1990	Succeeded by —
Preceded by Giovanni Giannetti da Fivizzano	Superior of Trabzon; 1966–1983	Succeeded by Position abolished
