= Giovanni Battista Federico Vallega =

Giovanni Battista Federico Vallega, sometimes Giambattista Federico Vallega (12 April 1876 – 4 December 1944) was an Italian prelate of the Catholic Church. He was Archbishop of İzmir, Turkey, from 1921 to 1929 and served in the Roman Curia.

== Biography ==
Giovanni Battista Federico Vallega was born in Genoa on 12 April 1876.

In 1915, he was chargé d'affaires in the Nunciature to the Netherlands. In 1918, he held the post of auditor in the Apostolic Nunciature to Belgium.

On 26 January 1921, Pope Benedict XV appointed him Archbishop of İzmir, Turkey.

He received his episcopal consecration on 17 April 1921 from Cardinal Willem van Rossum.

He resigned on 1 March 1929 and became titular archbishop of Nicopolis in Epiro. On 19 January 1936 he was honored with the title "Assistant to the Papal Throne".

On 9 December 1939 he became auditor general of the Apostolic Camera.

He died on 4 December 1944 at the age of 68.
