= Mersin Üçocak Elementary school =

Üçocak İlköğretim Okulu
- Camii Şerif Mahallesi, 118. Cadde, No:11 - 33060 Mersin

Information
- Type: Primary School
- Established: 1944

Mersin Üçocak İlköğretim Okulu (Mersin Üçocak Elementary School) is a public school in Mersin, Turkey.

The school was founded as a Catholic school by the Capucine friers in the 19th century. (see Mersin Catholic Church). In 1923 it was transferred to public authorities to be used as a school. In addition to office quarters, there are two main buildings (and a new building)

- 1.Building: Up to 1928 this building was used as a 5 years-primary school and up to 1945 it was used as a 3 years-secondary school. Between 1945 and 1966 the building was a technical secondary school for boys. After 1966, the building was again used as a secondary school and was named Mersin school.
- 2.Building :Up to 1934 it was a girls’ primary school. Between 1934 and 1941 it was the French consulate. 1944 it was opened as a primary school. The school used three names, up to 1945 Yuva, Up to 1974 Beşocak (5 January) and after 1974 Üçocak (3.of January) where the two dates refer to the end of French occupation at the end of the First World War (5.of January refers to liberation of most of Çukurova; 3.of January refers to liberation of Mersin) . In 1968 a new building was constructed on the yard of the former school and the classrooms were transferred to the new building. The original building is now under renewal.

In 1998 the Turkish government decided to merge the primary and secondary schools to form 8 years elementary schools. So the two schools were merged. The name of the secondary school and the primary school were also merged; so the school was named as Mersin Üçocak.
