= Cathedral of the Sacred Heart of Jesus (Skopje) =

Roman Catholic cathedral in Skopje, North Macedonia

Coordinates: 41°59′41″N 21°25′04″E

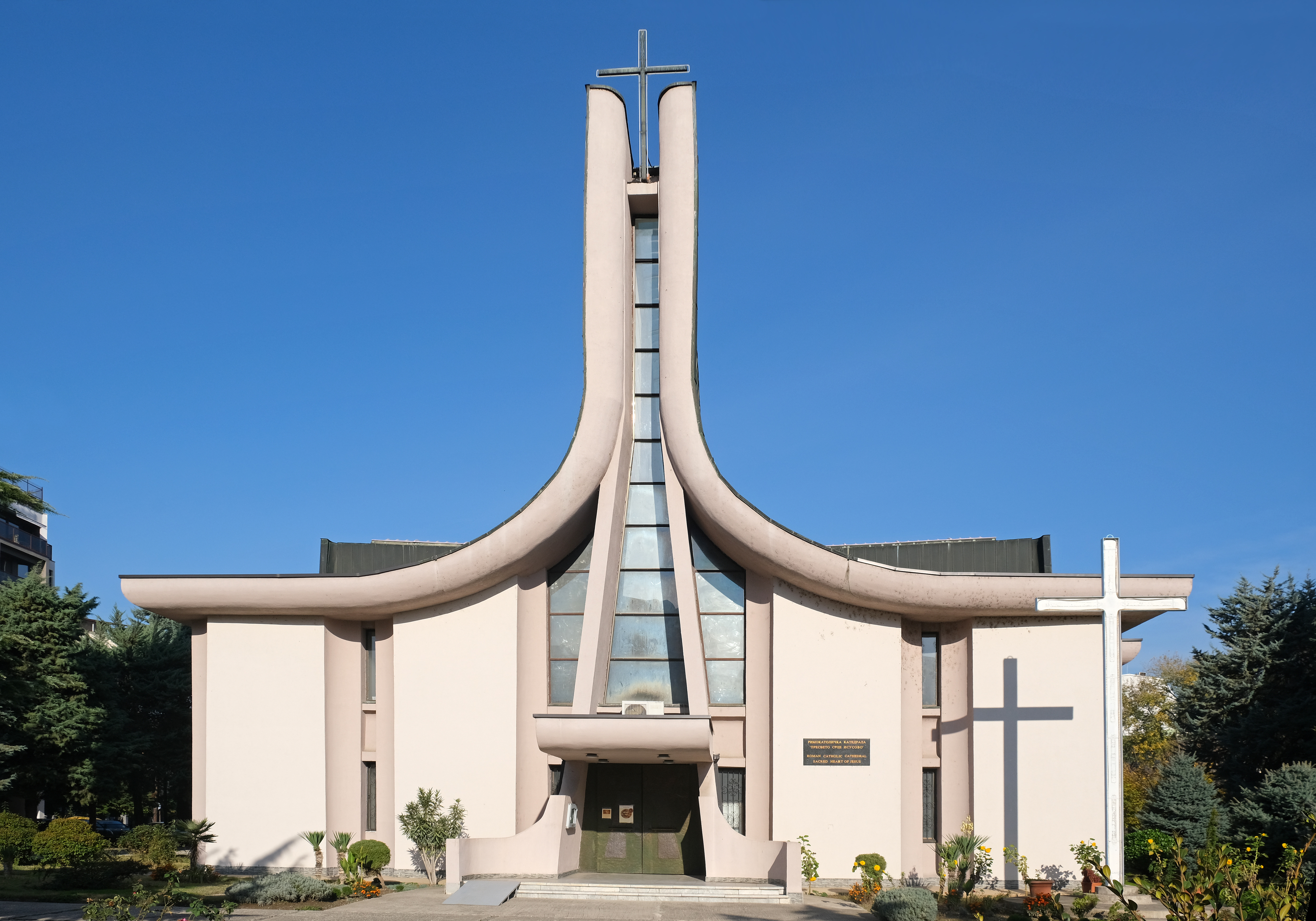
Sacred Heart Cathedral

The Cathedral of the Sacred Heart of Jesus in Skopje (Macedonian: Катедрала "Пресвето срце Исусово" во Скопје, Katedrala "Presveto srtse Isusovo" vo Skopje) is the Roman Catholic cathedral of the Diocese of Skopje, located in Skopje, the capital of North Macedonia. It was designed by the Macedonian architect Blagoja Mickovski-Bajo and completed in 1977. It replaced the old cathedral of the same name, destroyed by the 1963 Skopje earthquake. In its place is now a museum to Blessed Mother Teresa of Calcutta, who was born in the city.
