= Sergio and Domenica Bernardini =

Italian couple

Venerable Sergio Bernardini
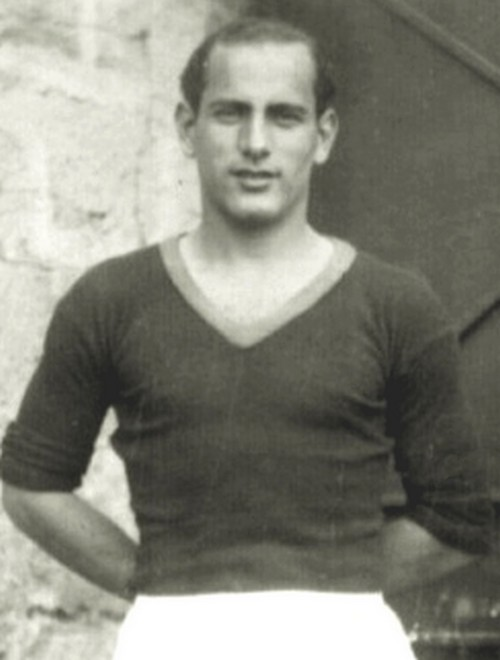
- Born: 20 May 1882; Sassoguidano, Modena, Kingdom of Italy
- Died: 12 October 1966 (aged 84); Verica, Modena, Italy

Venerable Domenica Bernardini
- Born: 12 April 1889; Verica, Modena, Kingdom of Italy
- Died: 27 February 1971 (aged 81); Verica, Modena, Italy

Sergio and Domenica Bernardini (12 April 1889 – 27 February 1971) were married Italian laypersons who hailed from Modena. The couple were members of the Secular Franciscan Order. They had ten children; eight of them joined the consecrated life.

== Lives ==
=== Sergio ===
Sergio Bernardini was born in Modena in 1882 to Giulio Bernardini and Cunegonda Barbuti as the elder of two sons. He married Emilia Romani and his three children from that marriage were: Mario, Medardo and Igina

From 1908 to 1912 he lost his parents and his brother as well as his first wife and their three children.

He immigrated to the United States of America in 1912 and found work as a miner. He returned to his hometown in 1913 due to the fact that he was afraid that life in a mine would make him lose his faith in Jesus Christ. He met Domenica Bedonni and the two married on 20 May 1914. The pair had ten children and became farmers.

After he retired he and his wife "adopted" a Nigerian seminarian to help him with his education for the priesthood. That seminarian became Archbishop Felix Alaba Job of Ibadan and served as a co-consecrator at their son's episcopal consecration in 1983. He died in 1966.

=== Domenica ===
Domenica Bedonni was born in 1889 to Enrico Bedonni and Matilde Caselli. At the age of eighteen she wanted to enter a convent but decided against it. She was engaged for a brief period of time but the man she was supposed to wed died before the wedding.

She married Sergio Bernardini in 1914. The pair went on to have ten children in Modena.

She stated in her spiritual testimony that all things led her to God and even by "kissing a rose, I kiss the beauty of God". She also said that her children were "my crown and my treasure" and wished to express what a gift it was not only to have ten children, but to have many vocations in her family. She prayed that her children would become saints and to "be a force for good in the world". She died in 1971.

=== Children ===
The couple had ten children: Igina, Agata, Amalia, Raffaella, Augusta, Maria, Paola, Teresa, Sebastiano, Giuseppe Six of their eight daughters became nuns and two sons became Capuchins. One of their descendants became Archbishop Giuseppe Germano Bernardini of Izmir.

== Beatification cause ==
The cause for the beatification of the Bernardini couple commenced on 30 September 2005 in Modena and a process to assemble documentation was held from 2006 to 2008. It was validated in 2010 before it was forwarded to the Congregation for the Causes of Saints. Pope Francis approved their lives of heroic virtue and proclaimed the pair to be venerable.
