= Martin Kmetec =

The Most Reverend Martin Kmetec Order of Friars Minor Conventual
- Archbishop of İzmir
- Church: Roman Catholic Church
- Archdiocese: İzmir
- See: İzmir
- Elected: 8 December 2020
- Installed: 2 February 2021
- Predecessor: Lorenzo Piretto, O.P.
- Previous post: priest

Orders
- Ordination: 29 June 1983 by Jožef Smej
- Consecration: 2 February 2021 by Paul Fitzpatrick Russell

Personal details
- Born: Martin Kmetec; 10 November 1956 (age 69) Ptuj, Slovenia
- Denomination: Catholic (Roman Rite)
- Coat of arms

Martin Kmetec, O.F.M. Conv. (born 10 November 1956) is the Archbishop of İzmir and a Conventual Franciscan friar. He was appointed to the episcopate as Archbishop of İzmir on 8 December 2020.

== Biography ==
Martin Kmetec was born in Ptuj in Slovenia, and was ordained as a Franciscan priest in 1983 by bishop Jožef Smej.

After his studies at the University of Ljubljana, he obtained his doctorate with a thesis on interreligious dialogue and carried out his ministry in Lebanon. From 2014 to 2018 he was vicar of the Conventual Friars Minor at the Custody of the Holy Land. Since 2011 he has been ministering in the convent of Istanbul, of which he became superior in 2018. He speaks Slovenian, Turkish, French, Arabic, and Italian.

On 8 December 2020 Pope Francis appointed him Archbishop of İzmir. He was consecrated on 2 February 2021 by archbishop Paul Fitzpatrick Russell, apostolic Nuncio to Turkey, Turkmenistan, and Azerbaijan.

== Ministry in İzmir ==
In the Archdiocese of İzmir, Martin Kmetec cares for a community of about 5,000 people, possibly more if migrants and refugees are included. Asked in an interview about freedom to evangelise, he said: "As a Franciscan, I consider the witness of life to be the core value, the fraternal life. St. Francis said that one should preach the Word whenever an opportunity to do so presents itself. We try to do that, for example on the social networks and on the archdiocese’s new website. We try to be actively involved and a living Church. Our mission is a mission of a Church with open doors. For this reason, all of our churches are open to the public at certain times. Sometimes devotions are held, and someone is always there at the church to greet visitors and to answer any questions they may have. This is the way of evangelisation we have chosen in light of the present situation."

In 2024, the Archbishop described Turkey as "the forgotten Holy Land", adding that "the Church of İzmir is the only one of the Seven Churches of Revelation to survive to this day".

Catholic Church titles
Preceded by Lorenzo Piretto O.P.	Archbishop of İzmir; 2020–	Succeeded by -
