= List of Roman Catholic dioceses in the Balkans =

This is a list of Roman Catholic dioceses in the Balkans i.e. dioceses of the Latin Church. In Balkanic Europe, the Roman Catholic Church comprises 8 episcopal conferences, 14 ecclesiastical provinces, 31 suffragan dioceses and 1 apostolic administration. There are 5 archdioceses, 3 dioceses, and 1 apostolic vicariate that are immediately subject to the Holy See.

== List of dioceses ==
=== Episcopal Conference of Albania ===
==== Ecclesiastical Province of Shkodër-Pult ====
- Archdiocese of Shkodër-Pult
  - Diocese of Lezhë
  - Diocese of Sapë

==== Ecclesiastical Province of Tirana-Durrës ====
- Archdiocese of Tiranë-Durrës
  - Diocese of Rrëshen
  - Apostolic Administration of Southern Albania

=== Episcopal Conference of Bosnia ===
==== Ecclesiastical Province of Sarajevo ====
- Archdiocese of Vrhbosna
  - Diocese of Banja Luka
  - Diocese of Mostar-Duvno
  - Diocese of Skopje
  - Diocese of Trebinje-Mrkan

=== Episcopal Conference of Croatia ===
==== Ecclesiastical Province of Rijeka ====
- Archdiocese of Rijeka
  - Diocese of Gospić–Senj
  - Diocese of Krk
  - Diocese of Poreč and Pula

==== Ecclesiastical Province of Sirmio ====
- Archdiocese of Djakovo-Osijek
  - Diocese of Požega
  - Diocese of Srijem

==== Ecclesiastical Province of Split-Makarska ====
- Archdiocese of Split-Makarska
  - Diocese of Dubrovnik
  - Diocese of Hvar
  - Diocese of Kotor
  - Diocese of Šibenik

==== Ecclesiastical Province of Zagreb ====
- Archdiocese of Zagreb
  - Eparchy of Križevci
  - Diocese of Varaždin

=== Episcopal Conference of Greece ===
==== Ecclesiastical Province of Corfu, Zakynthos and Cephalonia ====
- Archdiocese of Corfu, Zakynthos, and Cephalonia

==== Ecclesiastical Province of Naxos, Andros, Tinos and Mykonos ====
- Archdiocese of Naxos, Andros, Tinos and Mykonos
  - Diocese of Chios
  - Diocese of Crete
  - Diocese of Santorini
  - Diocese of Syros e Milos

=== Episcopal Conference of Romania ===
==== Ecclesiastical Province of Bucharest ====
- Archdiocese of Bucharest
  - Diocese of Iaşi
  - Diocese of Oradea Mare
  - Diocese of Satu Mare
  - Diocese of Timişoara

=== Episcopal Conference of Serbia ===
==== Ecclesiastical Province of Belgrade ====
- Archdiocese of Belgrade
  - Diocese of Subotica
  - Diocese of Zrenjanin

=== Episcopal Conference of Slovenia ===
==== Ecclesiastical Province of Ljubljana ====
- Archdiocese of Ljubljana
  - Diocese of Koper
  - Diocese of Novo Mesto

==== Ecclesiastical Province of Maribor ====
- Archdiocese of Maribor
  - Diocese of Celje
  - Diocese of Murska Sobota

=== Immediately subject to the Holy See ===
- Archdiocese of Alba Iulia
- Archdiocese of Athenai
- Archdiocese of Bar
- Diocese of Nicopoli
- Apostolic Administration of Prizren
- Archdiocese of Rhodos
- Diocese of Sofia and Plovdiv
- Apostolic Vicariate of Thessaloniki
- Archdiocese of Zadar
