= Archdiocese of İzmir =

Catholic archdiocese in Turkey

Coordinates: 38.4285°N 27.1396°E

Archdiocese of İzmir Archidioecesis Smyrnensis İzmir Başpiskoposluğu
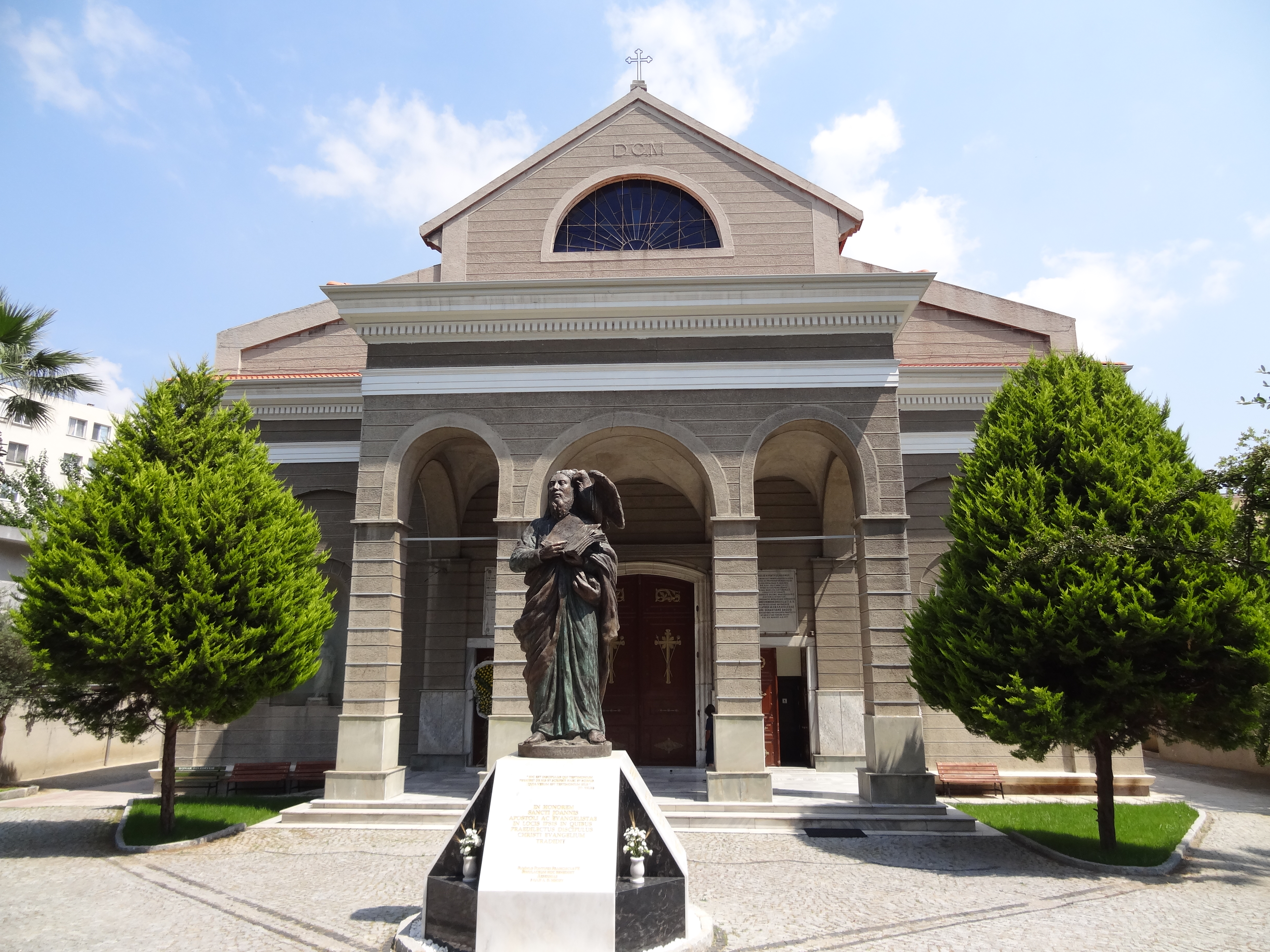
- St. John's Cathedral

Location
- Country: Turkey
- Ecclesiastical province: İzmir

Statistics
- Population: (as of 2022); 5,000
- Parishes: 10

Information
- Denomination: Roman Catholic
- Sui iuris church: Latin Church
- Rite: Roman Rite
- Established: 18 March 1818
- Cathedral: St. John's Cathedral
- Patron saint: Polycarp

Current leadership
- Pope: Leo XIV
- Archbishop: Martin Kmetec
- Bishops emeritus: Lorenzo Piretto

Map

The Roman Catholic Metropolitan Archdiocese of İzmir (Latin: Archidioecesis Smyrnensis) is a Latin archdiocese of the Roman Catholic Church in Asian Turkey (Anatolia).

The archdiocese's cathedral motherchurch and thus see of its archbishop is St. John's Cathedral. It also includes a World Heritage Site: Meryem Ana Evi Meryem Ana Evi, Bülbüldağı.

Martin Kmetec OFMConv, was appointed Archbishop of İzmir by Pope Francis on 8 December 2020.

== History ==
In 1346 was established a Latin Archdiocese of Smyrna (Smirne). In 1575 it was suppressed as residential see but immediately transformed into a Latin titular archbishopric. The title was held by:

- Eugenio di Pesaro, OESA (1575.11.16 – ?)
- Agostino Buzio di Varese, OFM (1580.07.04 – ?)
- Carlo Gaudenzio Madruzzo (1595.10.23 – 1600.04.02) (later Cardinal)

In 1625 the residential see was restored, but demoted to missionary pre-diocesan jurisdiction, as the Apostolic Vicariate of Smyrna.

It was promoted to the Metropolitan Archdiocese of İzmir by Pope Pius VII on 18 March 1818, though it lacked the suffragan sees that normally constitute the ecclesiastical province under a metropolitan archdiocese.

On 12 September 1896 it gained territory from the suppressed Apostolic Prefecture of Trabzon, on 20 July 1931 it lost territory to the Diocese of Chios (insular Greece).

It has been visited by Pope Paul VI in July 1967, Pope John Paul II in November 1979, and Pope Benedict XVI in November 2006.

According to the current bishop, around 5,000 Catholics live in the diocese, though the number could be higher if one factors in refugees and migrants. "They mainly live in the inner-city areas of İzmir and other large cities. We have communities also in Konya, Antalya and other cities along the coast. In terms of geographical area, our archdiocese is very large, comprising about 100,000 square kilometres. The last parish that belongs to us is Konya, which is located about 550 kilometres from İzmir; its southern counterpart is Antalya, which is about 450 kilometres away. That shows you how great the distances are."

== Ordinaries ==
(all Roman Rite)

=== Crusader age ===
Archbishops of Smyrna (Smirne)

- Guillaume Adam, OP (1318 – 1322.10.06), later Archbishop of Soltania (1322.10.06 – 1324.10.26), Metropolitan Archbishop of Bar (Montenegro) (1324.10.26 – death 1341)
- Benedetto (1343 – ?)
- Paolo di Tebe (1345.07.10 – 1357.05.15), later Metropolitan Archbishop of Thebae (Thebes, Greece) (1357.05.15 – 1366.04.17), Latin Titular Patriarch of Constantinople (1366.04.17 – death 1370), Apostolic Administrator of Patrasso (1367.10.20 – 1370)
- Pietro da Piacenza, OFM (1358.01.31 – 1362.03.04), later Archbishop-Bishop of Olena (1362.03.04 – ?)
- Tommaso di Savignon, OFM (1362.06.10 – ?)
- Raimondo di San Michele, OCarm (1373.02.14 – ?)
- Giorgio Dalmato, OCarm (1379.09.06 – ?)
- Giovanni di Berriaco, OESA (1386.10.10 – ?)
- Giovanni di Leicester, OCarm (1398 – ?)
- Paolo (1410 – ?)
- Francesco di Monte Granelli, OFM (1412.06.04 – ?)

=== Modern age ===
==== Apostolic Vicars of Smyrna (Smirne) ====
- Pietro de Marchi, OP (1625.02.19 – death 1648.07.13), previously Bishop of Santorini (insular Greece) (1611.04.18 – 1625.02.19)
- Giacinto Subiani, OP (1648.07.13 – 1652.03.05), Titular Archbishop of Edessa (1644.11.14 – 1648.07.13), succeeding as former Coadjutor Vicar Apostolic of Smyrna (1644.11.14 – 1648.07.13), later Apostolic Vicar of Constantinopole (Turkey) (1652.03.05 – 1656.10.15)
- Leone Macripodari (1659.04.05 – 1689)
- Antonio Giustiniani (1690.01.13 – 1694.02.08), later Bishop of Syros (Greece) (1694.02.08 – 1701.01.24), Apostolic Administrator of Diocese of Andros (insular Greece) (1698.05.02 – ?), Metropolitan Archbishop of Naxos (insular Greece) (1701.01.24 – death 1730.03)
- Apostolic Administrator Daniel Duranti, OFM. (1696.06.07 – 1706?; see below), while Metropolitan Archbishop of Skopje (Macedonia) (1690.12.11 – 1702.07.29)
- Fr. Nicolaus de Camillis (1706.05.12 – 1710.05.07), later Bishop of Syros (Greece) (1710.05.07 – 1710 not possessed)
- Apostolic Administrator Daniel Duranti, OFM. (see above 1708.06.23 – 1713.08.17), retired Metropolitan Archbishop of Skopje (Macedonia)
- Davide di San Carlo, OCD (1713.11.23 – death 1715.04.18)
- Filippo Bavestrelli (1715.08.09 – 1720.09.30), later Bishop of Chios (insular Greece) (1720.09.30 – death 1754.04.06)
- Pietro Battista di Garbagnate, OFMRef (1718.04.09 – 1720.06.15), emeritate as Titular Archbishop of Cartagine (1720.06.15 – death 1730.04.11)
- Pietro Francesco Lombardi, OFMRef (1720.08.30 – 1721.07.05), emeritate as Titular Bishop of Talia (1721.07.05 – death 1722)
- Bishop-elect Antonio Maturi, OFM (1722.04.15 – 1731.05.21), later Bishop of Syros (Greece) (1731.05.21 – 1733.04.13), Metropolitan Archbishop of Naxos (Greece) (1733.04.13 – 1749.07.21), Archbishop-Bishop of above Syros (1749.07.21 – death 1750.10)
- Dario de Longhis, OFM (1730.09.02 – 1735.05.25), later Bishop of Syros (Greece) (1735.05.25 – retired 1748.07.27)
- Gerolamo di Peraino, OFMRef (1735.02.05 – 1747)
- Joannes Baptista Bavestrelli (1747.05.12 – 1754.09.16), later Bishop of Chios (insular Greece) (1754.09.16 – 1772.08.31), emeritate as Titular Archbishop of Heraclea (1772.08.31 – death 1777.04.20)
- Eusebio Franzosini, OP (1754.12.20 – 1763)
- Domenico di Valdagno, OFMRef (1763.08.26 – 1779)
- Pietro Graveri di Moretta, OFMObs (1779.12.23 – 1781.08.17)
- Giulio Maria Pecori d’Ameno, OFM (1781.08.18 – 1788.09.23), later Titular Bishop of Aradus (1788.09.23 – death 1796.02.28) and Apostolic Vicar of Constantinopole (Turkey) (1788.09.23 – 1796.02.28)
- Pasquale Orlandini da Bergamo, OFMRef (1790.04.16 – 1817.06.26)
- Bishop-elect Luigi Maria Cardelli, OFMRef (1817.06.26 – 1818.03.18 see below), succeeding as former Coadjutor Vicar Apostolic of Smyrna (? – 1817.06.26)

==== Metropolitan Archbishops of İzmir (Smyrna) ====
- Luigi Maria Cardelli, OFMRef (see above 1818.03.18 – 1832.08.29), emeritate as Titular Archbishop of Acrida (1832.09.11 – 1868.06.11)
- Pierre-Dominique-Marcellin Bonamie, Picpus Fathers (SS.CC.) (1835.02.13 – 1837.11.24), previously Latin Bishop of Baghdad (Iraq) (1832.05.04 – 1835.02.13); later Superior General of Congregation of the Sacred Hearts of Jesus and Mary (Picpus Fathers) (1837.05.04 – 1853.07.26), emeritate as Titular Archbishop of Chalcedon (1837.11.24 – death 1874.07.08)
- Antonio Mussabini (1838.03.06 – death 1861.05.04)
- Giuseppe Maria Alberti (1862.01.07 – 1862.03.23 not possessed), previously Titular Bishop of Eumenia (1843.03.21 – 1851.10.30), Coadjutor Bishop of Syros (Greece) (1843.03.21 – 1851.10.30) succeeding as Bishop of Syros (1851.10.30 – death 1880.03.18)
- Vincent Spaccapietra (1862.04.08 – death 1878.11.24), Lazarists (C.M.), previously Titular Bishop of Arcadiopolis (1852.11.21 – 1855.04.18), Metropolitan Archbishop of Port of Spain (Trinidad and Tobago) (1855.04.18 – 1859.09.12), Titular Archbishop of Ancyra (1859.09.12 – 1862.04.08)
- Andrea Policarpo Timoni (1879.05.27 – 1904.08.01)
- Domenico Raffaele Francesco Marengo, OP (1904.08.01 – death 1909.06.12), succeeding as former Coadjutor Archbishop of İzmir (1904.03.08 – 1904.08.01) and Titular Archbishop of Titopolis (1904.03.08 – 1904.08.01)
- Giuseppe Antonio Zucchetti, OFMCap (1909.12.22 – death 1920.03.08), former Apostolic Prefect of Mardin (Turkey) (1879 – 1909.12.22); emeritate as Titular Archbishop of Trapezus (1920.03.08 – death 1931.06.01)
- Giovanni Battista Federico Vallega (1921.01.24 – 1929.03.01); later Titular Archbishop of Nicopolis in Epiro (1929.03.01 – death 1944.12.04), Apostolic Nuncio (papal ambassador) to Lithuania (1939.08.13 – retired 1939.12.09)
- Apostolic Administrator Giovanni Battista Dellepiane (1929.02.27 – 1930.01.18), Titular Archbishop of Stauropolis (1929.07.18 – 1961.08.13), later papal diplomat: Apostolic Delegate to Belgian Congo and Ruanda-Urundi (1930.01.18 – 1949.01.12), Apostolic Nuncio to Austria (1949.01.12 – 1951.12.21), Apostolic Nuncio to Austria (1951.12.21 – death 1961.08.13)
- Eduardo Tonna (1929.11.26 – 1937.12.02), emeritate as Titular Archbishop of Garella (1937.12.02 – 1939.04.15) and finally Titular Archbishop of Miletus (1939.04.15 – 1963.11.07)
- Joseph Emmanuel Descuffi, C.M. (1937.12.03 – 1965.11.04), later Titular Archbishop of Antinoë (1965.11.04 – 1971?, died 1972)
- Alfred Cuthbert Gumbinger, OFM Cap (1965.11.04 – death 1966.08.31)
- Apostolic Administrator Saverio Zupi (1966 – 1967.09.09), Titular Archbishop of Serra (1961.10.28 – 1983.03.01), papal diplomat
- Giovanni Enrico Boccella, TOR (1967.09.09 – 1978.12.07), emeritate as Titular Archbishop of Ephesus (1978.12.07 – death 1992.05.22)
- Domenico Caloyera, OP (1978.12.07 – 1983.01.22), previously Apostolic Administrator sede plena of Istanbul of the Greeks (Turkey) (1955.05.27 – 1957.01.28), Apostolic Administrator of Istanbul of the Greeks (Turkey) (1957.01.28 – 1973)
- Giuseppe Germano Bernardini, OFMCap (1983.01.22 – retired 2004.10.11)
- Ruggero Franceschini, OFMCap (2004.10.11 – 7 November 2015)
- Lorenzo Piretto, OP (7 November 2015 - 8 December 2020)
- Martin Kmetec, OFMConv (8 December 2020 - )

== See also ==
- Catholicism in Turkey
- Metropolis of Smyrna (Greek Orthodox)
- Apostolic Vicariate of Istanbul
