= Paskal Trokshi =

19th and 20th-century Catholic bishop

His Excellency Paskal Trokshi
- Archbishop of Diocese of Skopje
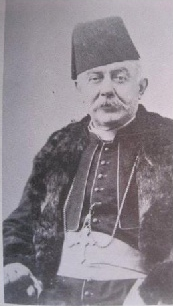
- Bishop Paskal Trokshi
- See: Skopje
- Installed: 10 Jan 1893
- Term ended: 22 Mar 1908
- Predecessor: Andrea Logorezzi
- Successor: Lazër Mjeda
- Other post: Archbishop of Diocese of Nakoleia

Orders
- Ordination: 5 May 1893

Personal details
- Born: January 2, 1850 Mallkuç, Scutari Vilayet, Ottoman Empire
- Died: July 28, 1917 (aged 67) Rome
- Denomination: Roman Catholic Church

Paskal Trokshi (January 2, 1850 – July 28, 1917), Italian: Pasquale Trocsci, was a Catholic religious figure who served as Archbishop of the Catholic Archdiocese of Skopje from 1893 to 1908.

== Life ==
Trokshi (first name varies as Pashk, Pashkal) was of Albanian ethnicity. According to Elsie he was born in Delbnisht village of Kurbin region in central Albania, back then Ottoman Empire. According to Albanian sources, he was born in Mallkuç village near Durrës in present-day Bubq municipality, son of Jak Trokshi and Diella Vathi, a Catholic woman from Kurbin. He remained orphan at a young age, and together with his brother Hilë moved to his mother's family.

His intelligence was noted by Raffaele D'Ambrosio, archbishop of the Archdiocese of Durrës, back then stationed in Delbnisht. With his intervention, Trokshi pursued his elementary education in his village, later in Albanian Pontifical Seminary in Shkodër. There he started his philosophy and theology studies, which he finished in Rome. He was ordained priest in 1873. After his return to Albania, he led the parish in Gurëz, Kurbin, and served as a secretary for D'Ambrosio. Trokshi was regarded as intelligent, but corrupt and much given to alcohol.

Regardless, on 29 December 1892, Pope Leo XIII nominates him as Archbishop of the Archdiocese of Skopje, which he officially took over on 10 January 1893. His ordination was performed by Bishop Pasquale Guerini (Pashk Guerini), Raffaele D'Ambrosio, and Abbot of Mirdita Preng Doçi. As requested by Trokshi, the ceremony took place in the Chapel of the Pontifical Seminary in Shkodër, on 5 May 1893.

Trokshi encountered increasing Slavic tendencies in the Albanian speaking parishes which he opposed, and started a series of reforms. This led to accusations from Slavic speaking parishes, which led to a drop in popularity, and opposition from Austro-Hungarian officials. One of his achievements was the reopening of the Albanian School of Stublla, dating from 1584 but closed during Ottoman oppression. This was followed by schools in the Albanian communities of Kosovo, İpek, Yakova, Ferizoviç, Zlakućan, etc. Trokshi resigned on 22 March 1908.
On 29 April 1908 he was elected Archbishop of Titular Diocese of Nakoleia (see: List of Catholic titular sees), and died in Rome, on 28 July 1917.
