= Louis Pelâtre =

French-born Roman Catholic bishop (1940–2026)

The Most Reverend Louis-Armel Pelâtre A.A.
- Vicar Apostolic of Istanbul
- Church: Catholic Church
- Appointed: 9 July 1992
- Installed: 13 September 1992
- Term ended: 16 April 2016
- Predecessor: Antuvan Marovitch
- Successor: Rubén Tierrablanca González
- Other post: Titular Bishop of Sasima (1992–2026)

Orders
- Ordination: 24 May 1969
- Consecration: 13 September 1992 by Sergio Sebastiani, Hovhannes Tcholakian and Antónios Varthalítis

Personal details
- Born: 12 May 1940 Pancé, France
- Died: 20 August 2026 (aged 86) Istanbul, Turkey
- Motto: Gloria Crucis

Louis-Armel Pelâtre, A.A. (12 May 1940 – 20 August 2026) was a French-born Turkish Roman Catholic prelate who served as Vicar Apostolic of Istanbul from 1992 until his retirement in 2016 and was titular bishop of Sasima.

== Early life and priesthood ==
Pelâtre was born in Pancé, Ille-et-Vilaine, France, on 12 May 1940. He joined the Augustinians of the Assumption and made his religious profession on 15 September 1962. He was ordained a priest on 24 May 1969 as a member of the order. Pelâtre subsequently served as an Assumptionist missionary in Turkey, where he became involved in the pastoral ministry of the Catholic community.

== Episcopate ==
On 9 July 1992, Pope John Paul II appointed Pelâtre Vicar Apostolic of Istanbul and titular bishop of Sasima.

The appointment was recorded in the Acta Apostolicae Sedis, where Pelâtre is listed as titular Bishop of Sasima and Vicar Apostolic of Istanbul. He was consecrated a bishop on 13 September 1992 at the Cathedral of the Holy Spirit in Istanbul. The principal consecrator was Archbishop Sergio Sebastiani, with Archbishop Hovhannes Tcholakian and Archbishop Antónios Varthalítis, A.A., serving as co-consecrators.

Pelâtre served as Vicar Apostolic of Istanbul for almost 24 years. In 1999, he was also appointed as apostolic administrator of the Greek Catholic Apostolic Exarchate of Istanbul. During his episcopate, Pelâtre was an important Catholic representative in Turkey and participated in relations between the Catholic Church and other Christian communities.

== Retirement ==
On 16 April 2016, Pope Francis accepted Pelâtre's resignation from the pastoral government of the Apostolic Vicariate of Istanbul, in accordance with canon 401 §1 of the 1983 Code of Canon Law. He was succeeded as vicar apostolic by the Franciscan priest Rubén Tierrablanca González, who was also appointed apostolic administrator of the exarchate for Byzantine-rite Catholics in Turkey. After his retirement, Pelâtre retained the title of Vicar Apostolic Emeritus of Istanbul and titular Bishop of Sasima.

== Death ==
Pelâtre died in Istanbul on 20 August 2026 at the age of 86.

== See also ==
- Catholic Church in Turkey
- Apostolic Vicariate of Istanbul

Catholic Church titles
Preceded by Antuvan Marovitch	Vicar Apostolic of Istanbul; 1992–2016	Succeeded by Rubén Tierrablanca González
Preceded by Wilhelm Cleven	Titular Bishop of Sasima; 1992–2026	Succeeded by Vacant
