= Paolo Bizzeti =

Italian prelate

Paolo Bizzeti S.J.
- Vicar Apostolic Emeritus of Anatolia
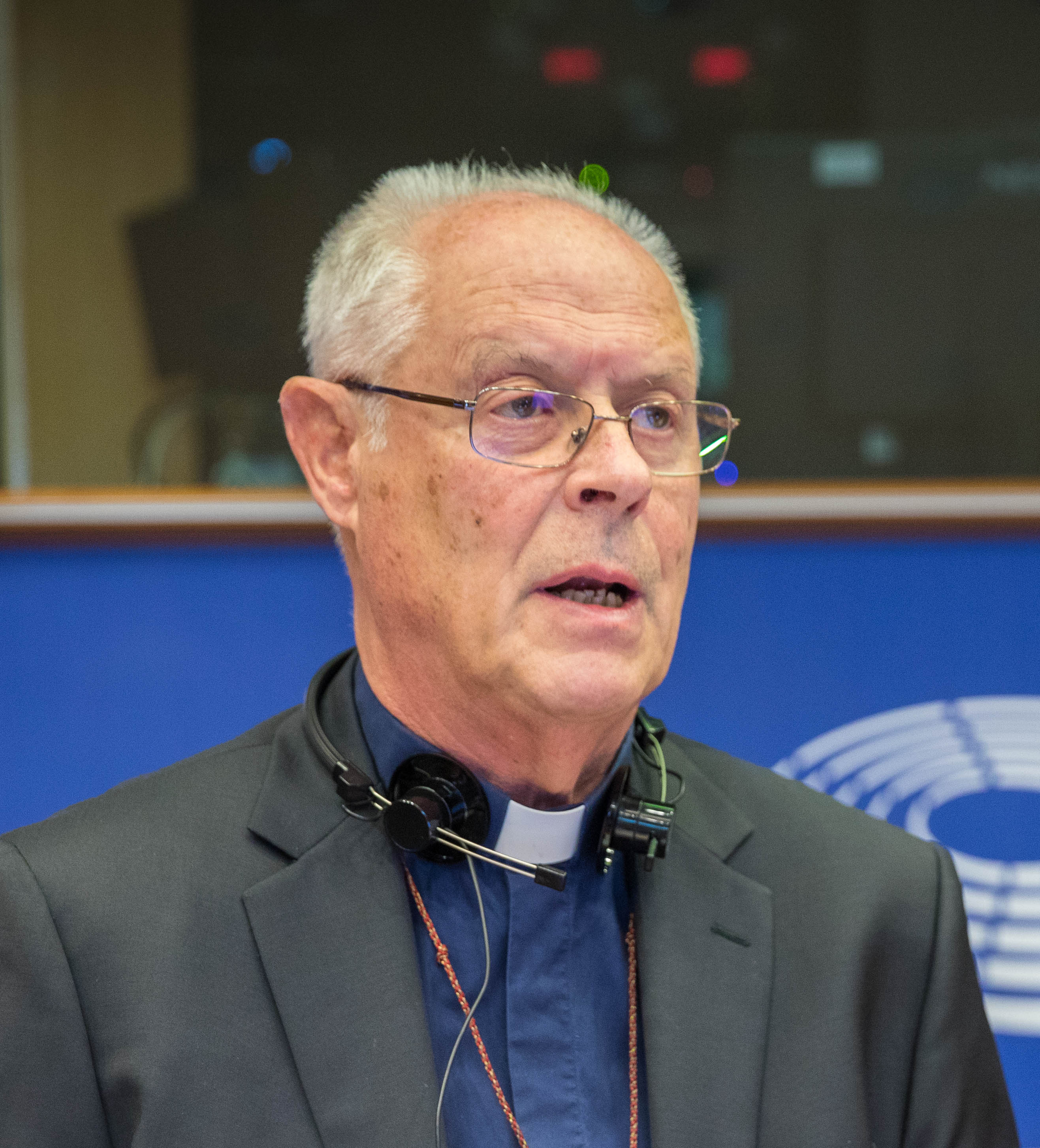
- Paolo Bizzeti in February 2020
- Church: Catholic Church
- See: Apostolic Vicariate of Anatolia
- In office: 14 August 2015 – 25 November 2024
- Predecessor: Luigi Padovese
- Other post: Titular Bishop of Tabae (since 2015)

Orders
- Ordination: 21 June 1975
- Consecration: 1 November 2015 by Cyril Vasiľ

Personal details
- Born: 22 September 1947 (age 78) Florence, Province of Florence, Italy
- Coat of arms

Paolo Bizzeti S.J. (born 22 September 1947) is an Italian prelate of the Catholic Church who has been a bishop and was Apostolic Vicar of Anatolia from 2015 to 2024.

== Biography ==
Paolo Bizzeti was born in Florence on 22 September 1947. He obtained his licentiate in philosophy at the Pontifical Faculty of Philosophy Aloisianum of Gallarate, his bachelor's degree in theology at the Pontifical Theological Faculty of Southern Italy, and a degree in philosophy at the Alma Mater Studiorum in Bologna.

He joined the Society of Jesus (Jesuits) on 22 November 1966, was ordained a priest on 21 June 1975, and made his final vows on 12 June 1982.

From 1981 to 1983 and again from 1988 to 2007, he was the Jesuit Provincial's delegate for vocational ministry; from 1988 to 1995, Superior of the Residence Baldinucci in Florence; and from 1995 to 2007, Director of the Villa San Giuseppe Spirituality Center in Bologna. In 2007 he led the spiritual exercises for the bishops of Emilia-Romagna. From 2003 to 2007 he was a consultant to the Jesuit Province of Italy and the Provincial's delegate for youth ministry for Italy; from 2007 to 2013, Rector of the Philosophical Scholasticate of the Aloisianum of Padua; and from 2007 to 2015 Rector of the Patavina Residence Antonianum and Director of the Centro Antonianum in Padua for the formation of the laity.

He also taught at institutions in the Veneto and Emilia Romagna as a specialist in Middle Eastern issues and founded organizations with specific interests in the Middle East. Beginning in 1990 he organized and guided pilgrimages to Ignatian sites in Spain, Paris, Rome.

On 14 August 2015, Pope Francis named him titular bishop of Tabae and Apostolic Vicar of Anatolia. Pope Francis chose him for this position on the recommendation of Father Adolfo Nicolás, Director General of the Jesuits. Bizzeti received his episcopal consecration on 2 November 2015 in the Basilica of Santa Giustina in Padua from Archbishop Cyril Vasiľ, secretary of the Congregation for the Oriental Churches. He was installed as Vicar in the cathedral in Iskenderun on 29 November. After two years, he described the Church in Turkey as "a Church of foreigners" that has operated on a Western model and had yet to undertake the work of inculturation with an eye to the creation of a diocesan church.

On 8 July 2019, Pope Francis made him a member of the Congregation for Institutes of Consecrated Life and Societies of Apostolic Life.

== Selected writings ==
- Il libro della Sapienza: struttura e genere letterario (in Italian). Brescia: Paideia. 1982.
- La Turchia: guida per i cristiani (in Italian). Bologna: Edizioni Dehoniane. 1990; with Marco Pratesi.
- Il favo stillante: lectio divina sugli Atti degli Apostoli (in Italian). Rome: Lipa. 1998.
- Fino ai confini estremi: meditazioni sugli Atti degli Apostoli (in Italian). Bologna: Edizioni Dehoniane. 2008.
- Meditazioni sugli Atti degli apostoli (in Italian). Bologna: Edizioni Dehoniane. 2009.
- Turchia. Guida biblica, patristica, archeologica e turistica (in Italian). Bologna: Edizioni Dehoniane. 2014. ISBN 9788810820995.
