= Roman Catholic Diocese of Skopje =

Roman Catholic diocese in North Macedonia

Diocese of Skopje Dioecesis Scopiensis Скопска бискупија

Catholic
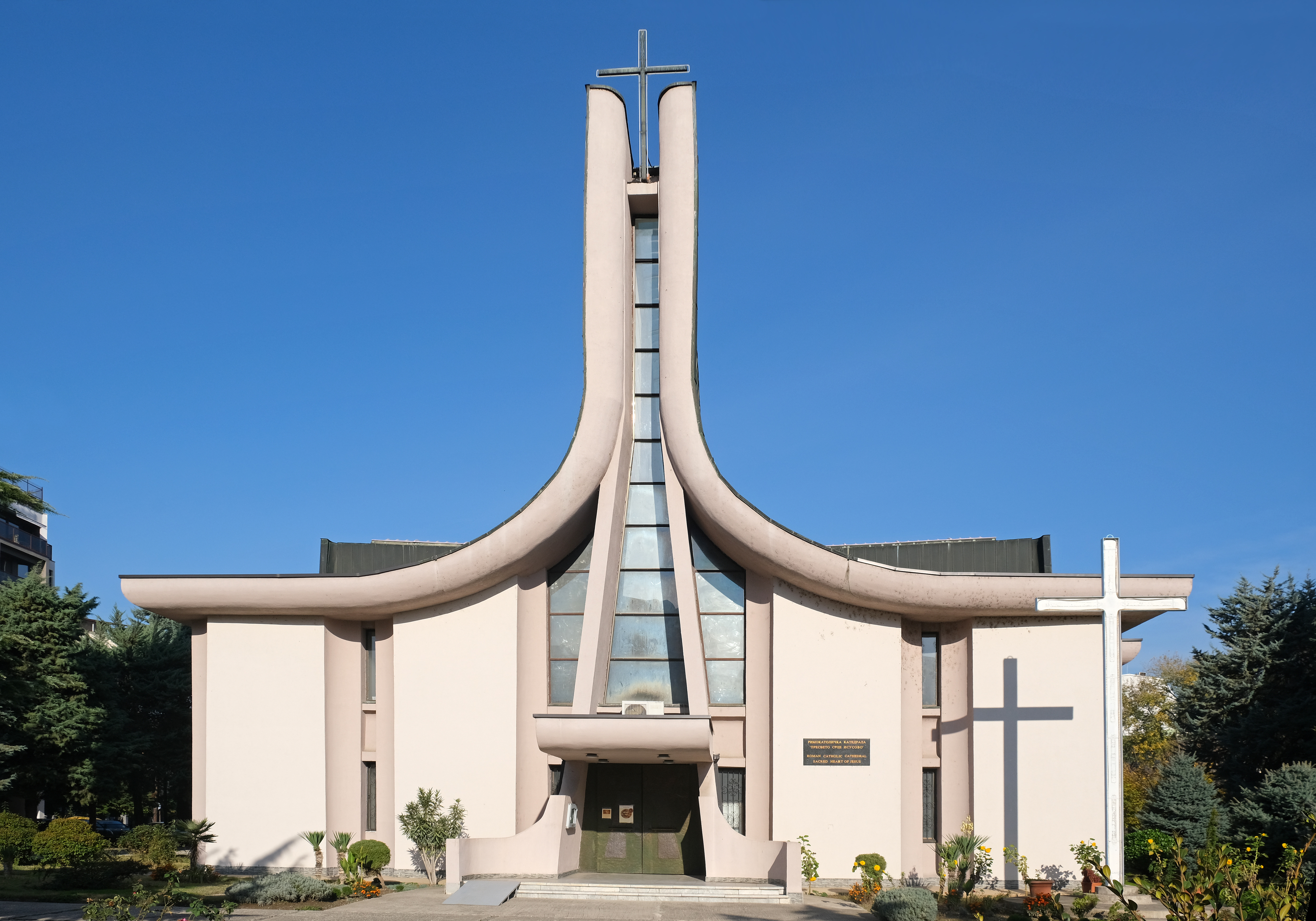
- Cathedral of the Sacred Heart of Jesus (Skopje)

Location
- Country: North Macedonia
- Ecclesiastical province: Archdiocese of Vrhbosna

Statistics
- Area: 25,713 km^{2} (9,928 sq mi)
- Population: Total; Catholics: (as of 2022); 2,311,180; 3,590 (0.2%)
- Parishes: 2

Information
- Denomination: Roman Catholic
- Sui iuris church: Latin Church
- Rite: Roman Rite
- Cathedral: Cathedral of the Sacred Heart of Jesus (Skopje)
- Co-cathedral: Co-Cathedral of the Sacred Heart (Bitola)
- Secular priests: 6

Current leadership
- Pope: Leo XIV
- Bishop: Kiro Stojanov
- Metropolitan Archbishop: Tomo Vukšić

The Diocese of Skopje (Macedonian: Скопска бискупија, romanized: Skopska biskupija), is a Latin Church diocese of the Catholic church in North Macedonia. From the 4th century to 1656, when it was renamed to Archdiocese of Skopje, it was known as the Archdiocese of Dardania. In 1969 along with the Roman Catholic Diocese of Prizren, it formed the Diocese of Skopje-Prizren. In 2000 it became a suffragan diocese of the Archdiocese of Vrhbosna, and the bishop is Kiro Stojanov, appointed in 2005.

== History ==
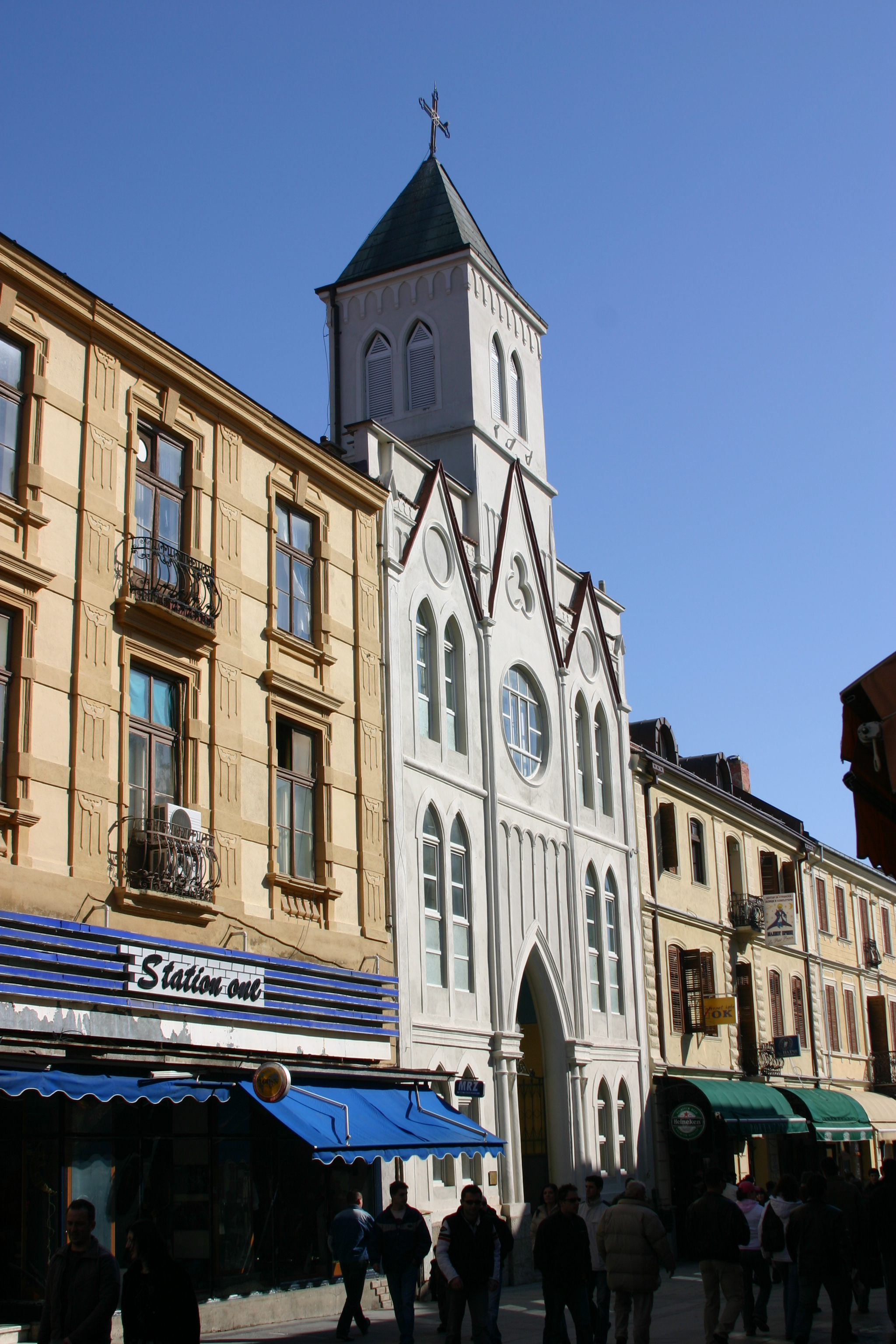
Co-Cathedral of the Sacred Heart in Bitola

There were Catholic bishops in the thirteenth and fourteenth centuries but Skopje remained Byzantine until 1282 when it was conquered by Serbia. After the arrival of the Ottomans and the defeat of the Serbs in the battle of Kosovo (1389), Skopje was conquered by Ottomans in 1392. It would be three centuries before Catholic see would be revived again: it was a titular see from 1346 to 1656. In 1689, after the defeat of the Turks in the battle of Vienna, the city was raided and taken by the Austrians, and the archdiocese was finally restored and renamed the Archdiocese of Skopje (Scopia). This marked a brief interlude, as the Turks pressed them back and the see was suppressed once again under the Turks. The archbishops had to reside in the Albanian mountains.

The modern history of the diocese begins 1816 with the appointment of Matej Krasniqi (Matthaes Crasnich) as the first resident archbishop of Skopje in over 500 years of Ottoman rule. Since then, there has been an unbroken string of bishops, who resided in Uskup from 1860.

Ottoman rule ended in 1912, when Skopje came under the rule of Kingdom of Serbia. In order to regulate status of Catholic Church, government of Serbia concluded official Concordat with Holy See on 24 June 1914. By the Second Article of Concordat, it was decided that "Diocese of Skopje" shall be created as a regular bishopric, and placed under jurisdiction of Roman Catholic Archdiocese of Belgrade that was about to be created. Because of the breakout of First World War, those provisions could not be implemented, and only after 1918 new arrangements were made.

In 1924, after the devastation of the First World War, the archdiocese was downgraded to a diocese. In 1969, the diocese was merged with the Roman Catholic Diocese of Prizren, and became the Diocese of Skopje-Prizren. In 2000, they were split once again, as the portion that was formerly the diocese of Prizren became the Apostolic Administration of Prizren, and the Diocese of Skopje returned to its former name.

== Ordinaries ==
=== Established in the 13th century ===
- Marino † (1204)
- Giovanni † (1298 – 17 October 1321, died)
- Giovanni, O.P. † (5 February 1327 – ?, died)
- Federico de Retersberck, O.F.M. † (8 July 1351 – ?, resigned)
- Giovanni Kaiode, O.E.S.A. † (14 March 1352 – ?, died)
- Giovanni di Siberg, O.Cist. † (23 October 1354 – 30 September 1384, died)
- Ermanno †
- Antonio di Teramo, O.F.M. † (5 July 1400 – ?)
- Roberto Towta, O.Cist. † (12 August 1402 – ?)
- Alberto †
- Giovanni Heldin, O.P. † (? – 1466, died)
- Benedetto Warsalunus † (10 November 1518 – ?)
- Stefano Zacalnizi † (3 August 1554 – ?, died)
- Francesco de Andreis † (20 July 1571 – ?, died)
- Giacinto Macripodari (29 July 1645 – 1649)

=== Archdiocese of Skopje ===
- Andrea Bogdani (1656–1677), first Roman Catholic Archbishop of Skopje
- Pjetër Bogdani (1677–1689)
- Daniel Duranti (1690 – resigned 29 July 1702)
- Peter Karagić (1702–1728)
- Mihael Summa (1728–1743)
- Giovanni Battista Nicolovich Casasi (1743–1752)
- Thomas Tomicich (1753–1758)
- Matija Mazarek (1758–1808)
- Matej Krasniqi (spelled as: Matthaeus Crasnich) † (8 March 1816 Appointed – 1829 Died)
- Pietro Sciali † (30 July 1833 Appointed – resigned 1839, d. 20 Aug 1854)
- Gaspar Crasnich (24 Jun 1839 Appointed – ?)
- Dario Bucciarelli, O.F.M. † (6 June 1864 Appointed – 1878 Died)
- Fulgencije Carev (spelled as: Fulgenzio Czarev), O.F.M. † (28 March 1879 Appointed – 1 June 1888 Appointed, Archbishop (Personal Title) of Hvar (-Brač and Vis))
- Andrea Logorezzi † (1888 Appointed – 1891 Died)
- Pashkal Trokshi (spelled as: Pasquale Trosksi) † (10 January 1893 Appointed – 22 March 1908 Resigned)
- Lazër Mjeda † (14 April 1909 Appointed – 19 October 1921 Appointed, Archbishop of Shkodra)

=== Diocese of Skopje ===
- Janez Frančišek Gnidovec (spelled as: Giovanni Francesco Gnidovec), C.M. † (29 October 1924 Appointed – 1939 Died)
- Smiljan Franjo Čekada † (18 August 1940 Appointed – 12 June 1967 Appointed, Coadjutor Archbishop of Vrhbosna {Sarajevo})

=== Diocese of Skopje-Prizren ===
- Joakim Herbut † (2 October 1969 Appointed – 24 May 2000)
- Marko Sopi † (Apostolic Administrator, 2 November 1995 Appointed – 24 May 2000 Appointed Apostolic Administrator of Prizren)

=== Diocese of Skopje ===
- Joakim Herbut † (24 May 2000 Appointed – 15 April 2005 Died)
- Kiro Stojanov (20 July 2005 Appointed – )

== See also ==
- List of Roman Catholic dioceses in Balkanic Europe
