= Catholic Church in Turkey =

The Catholic Church in Turkey is part of the worldwide Catholic Church, under the spiritual leadership of the Pope and the canonical leadership of the curia in Rome that is submitted to the Pope.

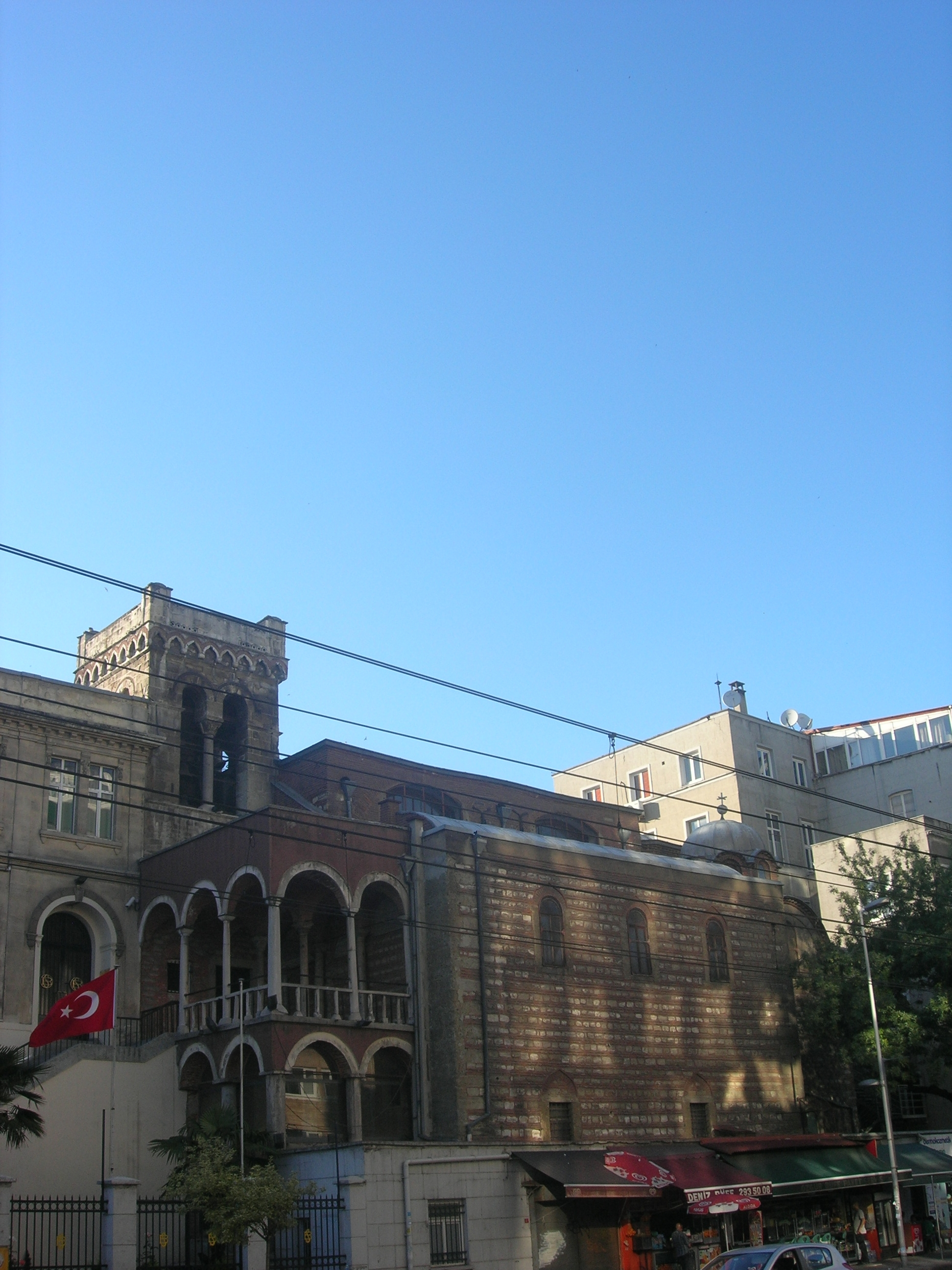
Catholic medieval Church of St Benoit, Istanbul

== Demographics ==
In the 2000s, there are around 25,000 Roman Catholics, constituting 0.05% of the population. The faithful follow the Latin, Byzantine, Armenian and Chaldean Rites. Most Latin Church Catholics are Levantines of mainly Italian or French background, with a few are ethnic Turks, who are usually either converts via marriage to Levantines or other non-Turkish Catholics, or are returnees from Europe who converted there, and who may often be still registered as Muslim by the government. Byzantine, Armenian, and Chaldean rite Catholics are generally members of the Greek, Armenian, and Assyrian minority groups respectively. Turkey's Catholics are concentrated in Istanbul.

By 2020, there were approximately 70 priests and 50 nuns serving in 52 parishes; the church also ran 6 hospitals and homes for the old and infirm.

== Persecution ==
The Catholic Christian community was shocked when Father Andrea Santoro, an Italian missionary working in Turkey for 10 years, was shot twice in February 2006 at his church near the Black Sea. He had written a letter to the Pope asking him to visit Turkey. Pope Benedict XVI visited Turkey in November 2006. Relations had been rocky since Pope Benedict XVI had stated his opposition to Turkey joining the European Union. Turkey's Council of Catholic Bishops met with the Turkish prime minister in 2004 to discuss restrictions and difficulties such as property issues. On June 6, 2010, Bishop Luigi Padovese, the Vicar Apostolic of Anatolia, was killed.

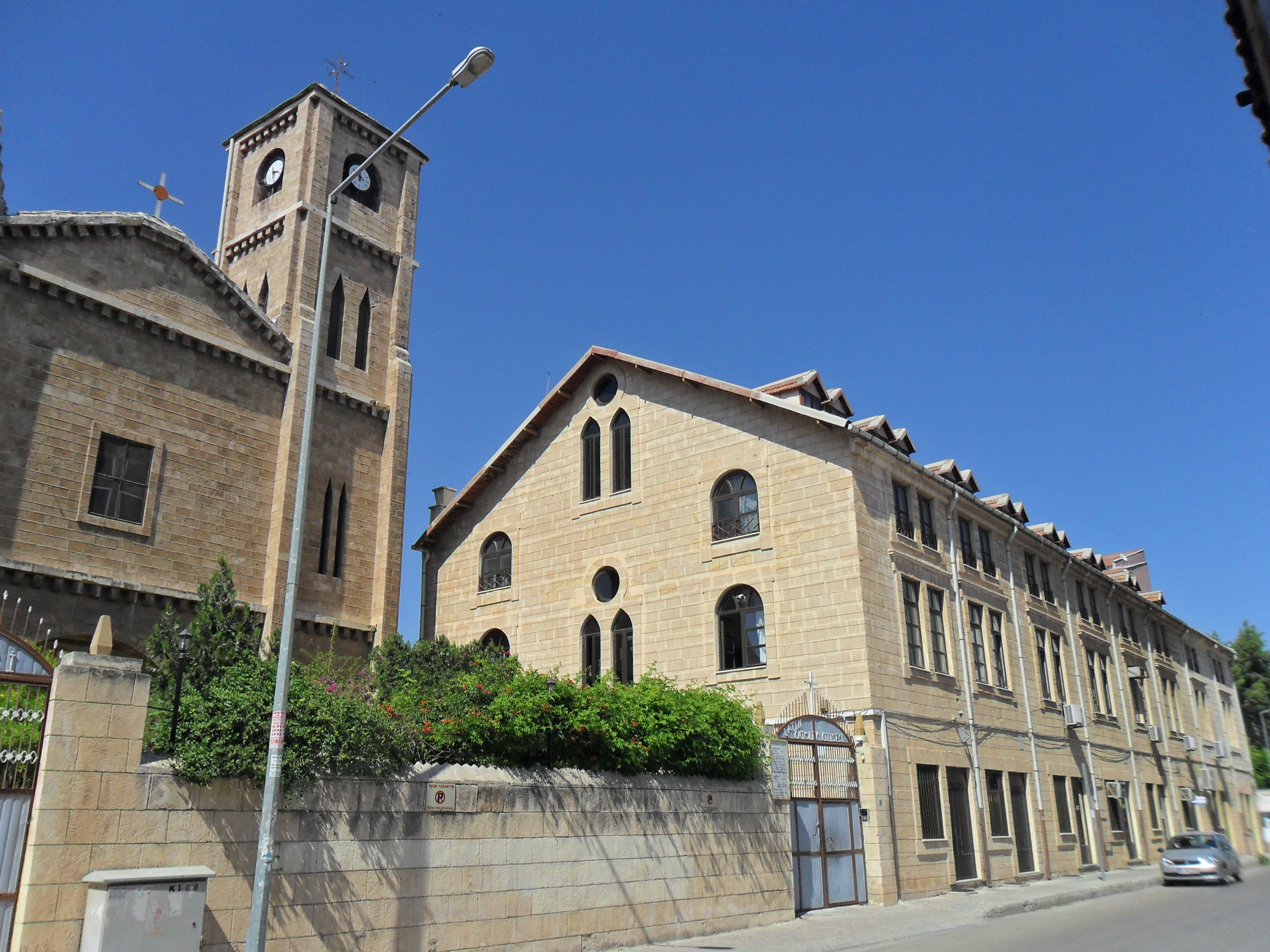
Cathedral of St. Anthony of Padua, Mersin

== Organization ==
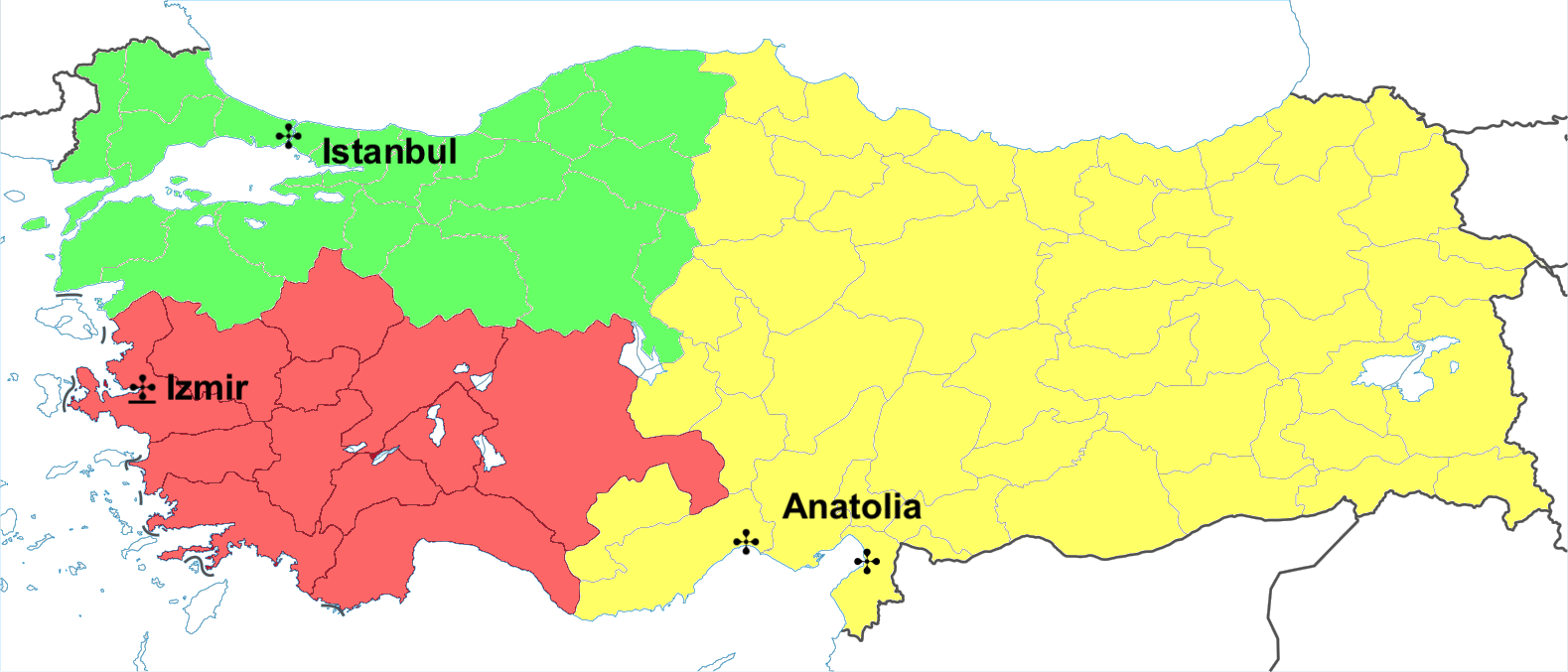
Latin Church jurisdictions in Turkey

- Latin Church:
  - Archdiocese of İzmir
    - seat in İzmir
    - Cathedral: St. John's Cathedral (İzmir)
    - Jurisdiction: archdiocese without suffragan dioceses
  - Apostolic Vicariate of Anatolia
    - seat in Iskenderun
    - Cathedral: Cathedral of the Annunciation, Iskenderun
    - Co-Cathedral: St. Anthony of Padua Co-Cathedral, Mersin
    - Jurisdiction: Immediately Subject to the Holy See
  - Apostolic Vicariate of Istanbul
    - seat in Istanbul
    - Cathedral: Cathedral of the Holy Spirit, Istanbul, Basilica minor
    - Basilica minor: St. Anthony of Padua Basilica, Istanbul
    - Jurisdiction: Immediately subject to the Holy See
- Armenian Catholic Church:
  - Archeparchy of Istanbul
    - seat in Istanbul
    - Cathedral: Holy Mother of God Armenian Cathedral Church, Istanbul
    - Jurisdiction: Immediately subject to the Armenian Catholic Patriarchate of Cilicia
- Chaldean Catholic Church:
  - Archdiocese of Diyarbakır
    - seat in Beyoğlu, Istanbul
    - Cathedral: St. Mary's Cathedral, Diyarbakır
    - Jurisdiction: Immediately subject to the Chaldean Catholic Patriarchate of Babylon
- Greek Byzantine Catholic Church:
  - Apostolic Exarchate of Istanbul
    - seat in Istanbul
    - Cathedral: Holy Trinity Greek Catholic Cathedral, Istanbul (Ayatriada Rum Katoliki Kilise)
    - Jurisdiction: Immediately subject to the Holy See
- Melkite Greek Catholic Church
  - Patriarchal Exarchate of Istanbul
    - seat in Istanbul
    - Church: Melkite Catholic Church Saint Pantaleon (historical)
    - Jurisdiction: Immediately subject to Melkite Patriarch
- Syriac Catholic Church:
  - Exarchate of Turkey
    - seat in Istanbul
    - Cathedral:
    - Jurisdiction: Immediately subject to the Syriac Catholic Church

== See also ==
- Christianity in Turkey
- Religion in Turkey
- Freedom of religion in Turkey
- Episcopal Conference of Turkey
- List of Saints from Asia
- Religious minorities in Turkey
