= Lorenzo Piretto =

His Excellency Lorenzo Piretto O.P.
- Archbishop Emeritus of İzmir
- Church: Roman Catholic Church
- Archdiocese: İzmir
- In office: 7 November 2015 – 8 December 2020
- Predecessor: Ruggero Franceschini
- Successor: Martin Kmetec O.F.M.Conv.
- Previous posts: Parish priest, Istanbul; Professor at University of Marmara

Orders
- Ordination: 4 August 1969
- Consecration: 20 December 2015 by Boghos Lévon Zékiyan

Personal details
- Born: 15 December 1942 (age 83) Mazzè, Kingdom of Italy
- Education: University of Bologna; University of Turin
- Motto: Misericordia
- Coat of arms

Styles of Lorenzo Piretto
- Reference style: The Most Reverend
- Spoken style: Your Excellency
- Religious style: Monsignor
- Posthumous style: none

Lorenzo Piretto, O.P. (born 15 December 1942) is an Italian-born Roman Catholic prelate, who served as an Archbishop of İzmir and a Dominican friar. He was ordained to the episcopate and installed as Archbishop of İzmir on 20 December 2015, five days after his 73rd birthday.

== Biography ==
Lorenzo Piretto was born in Mazzè in the frazione of Tonengo in 1942, and was ordained as a Dominican priest in 1966. He continued his theological studies in Bologna, where he was licensed in 1967, and in Turin where he became a doctor in 1972. From 1967 to 1974 he taught philosophy at the Dominican seminary of Chieri.

From 1983 to 2005 he taught Italian at Marmara University and, during the same period, was a journalist for the Christian review publication Presence.

From 2004 to 2015, he was a parson in St Peter and Paul church in Istanbul.

On 7 November 2015 Pope Francis appointed him Archbishop of İzmir. He was consecrated on 20 December 2015, by Armenian Catholic Archeparch of Istanbul Boghos Lévon Zékiyan.

He resigned on 8 December 2020.

Catholic Church titles
Preceded by Ruggero Franceschini	Archbishop of İzmir; 2015–2020	Succeeded by Martin Kmetec O.F.M. Conv.
