= Syriac Catholic Patriarchal Exarchate of Turkey =

Eastern Catholic ecclesiastical jurisdiction in Turkey

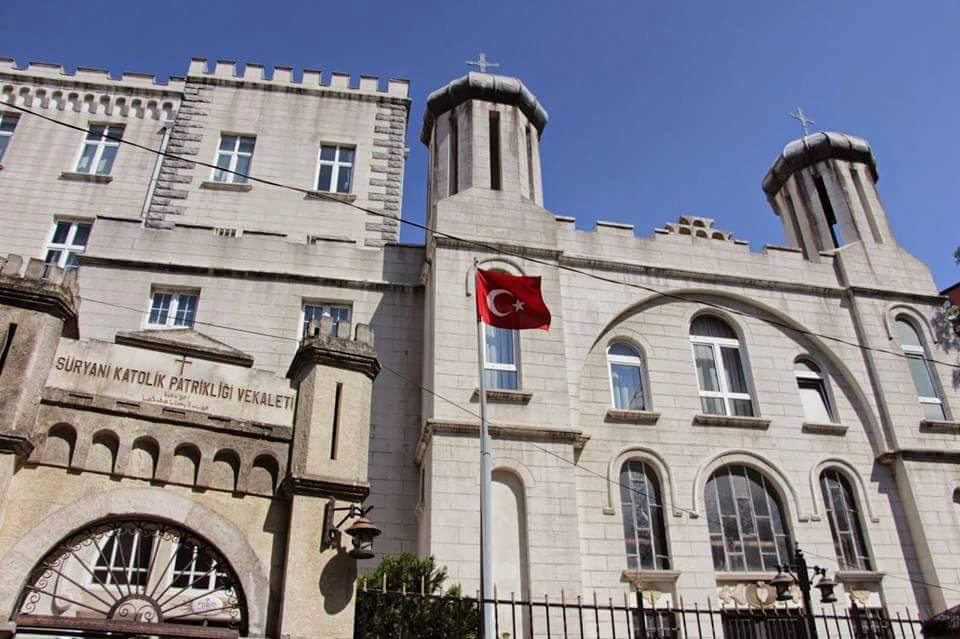
Syriac Catholic Church in Beyoğlu, Istanbul.

The Syriac Catholic Patriarchal Exarchate of Turkey (informally Turkey of the Syriacs) is the presence of the Syriac Catholic Church in Turkey.

It is part of the Syriac Catholic Church, an Eastern Catholic particular church that conducts its liturgy in the Syriac language and uses the West Syrian Rite.

It is under the jurisdiction of the Syriac Catholic Patriarch of Antioch.

== History ==
It was established in 1991 as Patriarchal Exarchate of Turkey on territory that previously had no proper ordinary for the particular church, which previously administered it as a patriarchal vicariate, whose first vicar was promoted to be the first exarch.

In 2018, the Syriac Catholic community in Istanbul was leased Sacre Coeur Church, in the Beşiktaş district of the city, by the government to use free of charge for the following 49 years. The church was originally built by the Jesuits in 1910, but was soon taken into possession by the Turkish state and fell into ruin. In the 1970s the Syriac Catholic community settled in Istanbul and, finding no other church available, used the church. In 1997, the community was originally granted the church for 99 years by the Directorate General of Foundations, but this was disputed by the Ministry of Treasury and Finance, before being finally approved on 23 July 2018.

== Exarchs of Turkey ==
- Monsignor Yusuf Sağ (1991 – 2 July 2017), previously last Patriarchal Vicar of Turkey of the Syriacs (1985 – 1991)
- Monsignor Orhan Abdulahad Çanli (2 July 2017 - ...)

== See also ==
- Catholic Church in Turkey

== Bibliography ==
- Patriarchal Exarchate of Turkey from GCatholic.org.
