= Aïn Tebernoc =

Africa Proconsularis (125 AD).

Aïn Tebernoc is a former Catholic diocese and archaeological site in Tunisia.

== History ==
Aïn Tebernoc has numerous Roman era ruins and is tentatively identified as the site of the ancient city of Tubernuca, a municipium of the Roman Province of Africa Proconsolare Numerous inscriptions in situ confirm the name and status of the Roman city.

Following the Reconquista of Spain, a group of Andalusian Moors settled in its ruins at the end of the 15th century.

Ancient Tubernuca was also the seat of an ancient Catholic Bishopric. It was a suffragan of Carthage, which survives today as a titular Bishopric of the Roman Catholic Church. Only one bishop from antiquity is known to us, Repositus, a correspondent with Cyprian. The current bishop of the Bishopric is Antuan Ilgit, auxiliary bishop of Apostolic Vicariate of Anatolia since 2023.
