= Apostolic Vicariate of Anatolia =

Roman Catholic missionary jurisdiction in Turkey

Apostolic Vicariate of Anatolia Vicariatus Apostolicus Anatoliensis Anadolu Havarisel Vekilliği

Location
- Country: Turkey
- Metropolitan: None (immediately subject to the Holy See)
- Coordinates: 39.09°N 39.70°E
- Population: Catholics: (as of 2014); 2,800

Information
- Rite: Latin Rite
- Cathedral: Cathedral of the Annunciation, İskenderun
- Co-cathedral: Co-Cathedral of St. Anthony of Padua, Mersin

Current leadership
- Pope: Francis
- Apostolic Vicar: Sede vacante
- Apostolic Administrator: Antuan Ilgit
- Bishops emeritus: Paolo Bizzeti

Map

Website
- Website of the Vicariate

The Apostolic Vicariate of Anatolia (Latin: Vicariatus Apostolicus Anatoliensis, Turkish: Anadolu Havarisel Vekilliği) is a Roman Catholic Latin apostolic vicariate in the eastern half of Anatolia (Asian Turkey).

The missionary pre-diocesan jurisdiction is not part of any ecclesiastical province. It is under the direction of the Congregation for the Oriental Churches, an unusual structure for a Latin see, and directly dependent on the Holy See.

Its cathedral seat is the Marian Cathedral of the Annunciation in İskenderun (Alexandria). It has the Co-Cathedral of St. Anthony of Padua in Mersin as well.

== History ==
- Established originally on 13 March 1845 as the Apostolic Prefecture of Trabzon, named for its location on the Black Sea, not for any preceding jurisdiction.
- Suppressed on 12 September 1896, with its territory merged into the Roman Catholic Archdiocese of İzmir in western Anatolia.
- Restored on 20 June 1931 as the Mission sui iuris of Trabzon, its territory taken from the Apostolic Vicariate of Constantinople.
- Promoted on 30 November 1990 as the Apostolic Vicariate of Anatolia, led by a titular bishop.

As of 2020, the vicariate, which covers 450k square kilometers, had six parishes and two missions to serve a thousand Turkish Christians as well as Christian refugees from Syria, Iraq, Iran, Afghanistan, and Pakistan.

== Ordinaries ==
Apostolic Prefects of Trabzon (Independent Mission)

- Damiano da Viareggio, OFMCap (1845 – 1852)
- Filippo Maria da Bologna, OFMCap (1852 – 1881)
- Eugenio da Modica, OFMCap. (1881 – 12 September 1896)

Ecclesiastical Superiors of Trabzon

- Michele da Capodistria, OFMCap (20 June 1931 – 9 March 1933)
- Giovanni Giannetti da Fivizzano, OFMCap (9 March 1933 – 1955)
- Prospero Germini da Ospitaletto, OFMCap (1955 – 1961)
- Michele Salardi da Novellara, OFMCap (1961 – 1966)
- Giuseppe Germano Bernardini, OFMCap (19 December 1966 – 30 November 1990)
  - When Bernardini became archbishop of İzmir in 1983, he continued here as apostolic administrator.

Apostolic Vicars of Anatolia

  - Bernardini continued as apostolic administrator when the vicariate was erected on 30 November 1990
- Ruggero Franceschini, OFMCap (2 July 1993 – 11 October 2004)
- Luigi Padovese, OFMCap (11 October 2004 – 3 June 2010)
  - Franceschini returned as apostolic administrator (12 June 2010 – 14 August 2015)
- Paolo Bizzeti, SJ (14 August 2015 – 25 November 2024)
  - Antuan Ilgit SJ, apostolic administrator (25 November 2024-present)

== See also ==
- Catholic Church in Turkey

== Sources and external links ==
- GCatholic.org with incumbent bio links
- Catholic Hierarchy
