= Co-Cathedral of St. Anthony of Padua (Mersin) =

Church in Mersin, Turkey

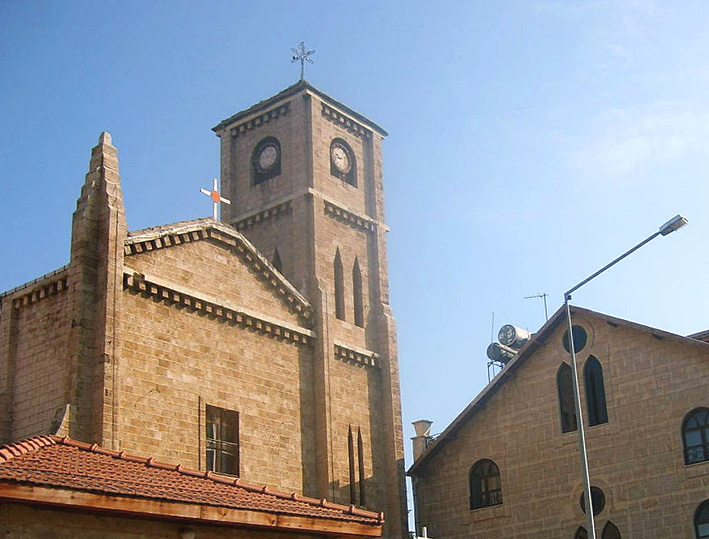
The church from southwest

The Co-Cathedral of St. Anthony of Padua also St. Anthony Latin Catholic Church of Mersin (Turkish: Aziz Antuan Latin Katolik Kilisesi) is a church in Mersin, Turkey. It is a co-cathedral of the Vicariate Apostolic of Anatolia.

It is in the business quarters of the city at 36°48′04″N 34°38′02″E. At the beginning of the 19th century, Mersin was a small village and the Christian population of the region was concentrated in nearby Tarsus (birthplace of St Paul) . But towards the mid-19th century, Mersin flourished as a port of Çukurova (Cilicia). Meanwhile because of Druze-Christian disturbances in Lebanon, many Christians migrated to Mersin. Also at this time the French consulate moved from Tarsus to Mersin and with it went most of the Catholic population of Tarsus. With every passing day, Mersin became more important and in 1853 it was decided that a church should be built in Mersin. In May 1854 Peder Antonio moved from Tarsus to Mersin.

On 18 September 1855, the Ottoman sultan Abdulmejid I gave the firman (decree) to build a church. The church and an accompanying school under the direction of Capucine friars continued up to the World War I in which both Italy and France were opposers of Turkey. After a temporary halt during the war, the school reopened at the conclusion of the war. But it was closed in 1923 and the buildings were transferred to public authorities. (See Mersin Üçocak İlkokulu) The church is still active.
