= St. John's Cathedral (İzmir) =

Coordinates: 38°25′43″N 27°08′22″E

St. John's Cathedral of İzmir
- Aziz Yuhanna Katedrali
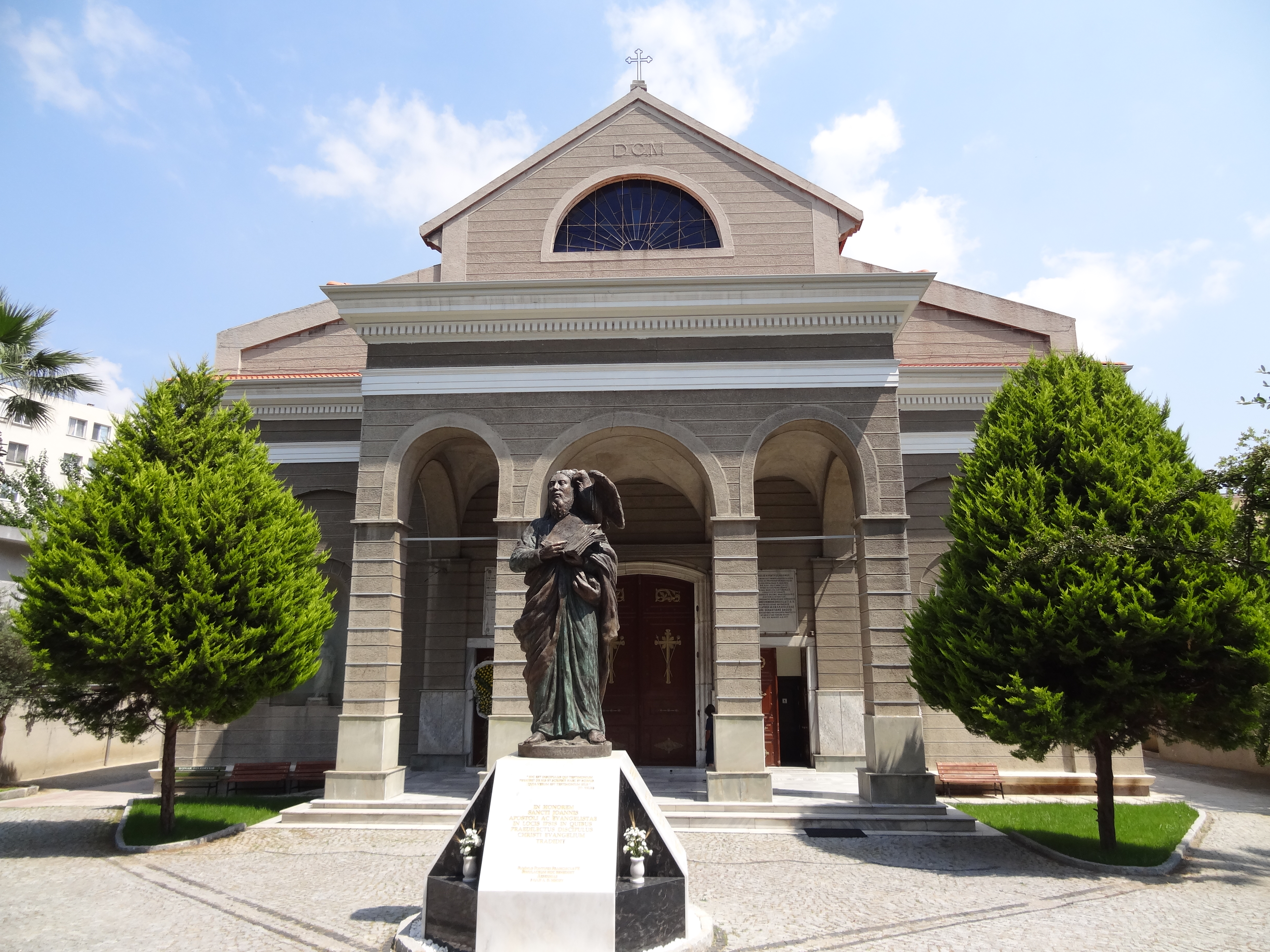
- St. John's Cathedral and the statue of John the Evangelist
- St. John's Cathedral of İzmir
- Location: İzmir
- Country: Turkey
- Denomination: Roman Catholic Church

History
- Dedication: John the Evangelist
- Dedicated: 1874

St. John's Cathedral (Turkish: Aziz Yuhanna Katedrali) is a cathedral in İzmir, Turkey. It is the seat of the Roman Catholic Archdiocese of İzmir. The cathedral is dedicated to John the Evangelist, who in the Book of Revelation sent greetings and instructions to the Seven churches of Asia, including Smyrna (İzmir).

== History ==
The cornerstone of the cathedral was laid in 1862. In 1863 the Ottoman Sultan, Abdülaziz, donated 11,000 gold Turkish lira for the construction and Christians from Lyon in France also contributed. The link with Lyon was due to missionaries from Smyrna introducing Christianity to Lyon in the second century.

The building was finished in 1874, and dedicated on May 25, 1874, by Archbishop Vincent Spaccapietra, Apostolic Delegate to Asia Minor. (Note: His monument is located at the north side of the cathedral garden.) Prior to this time, a church which is now the parish church of Sancta Maria served as the pro-Cathedral for the diocese.

In 1965 the then Archbishop of Smyrna, Joseph Emmanuel Descuffi, granted permission to NATO Military personnel, both Protestant and Catholic, and their dependents stationed in İzmir to use the cathedral for religious services.

== Interior ==
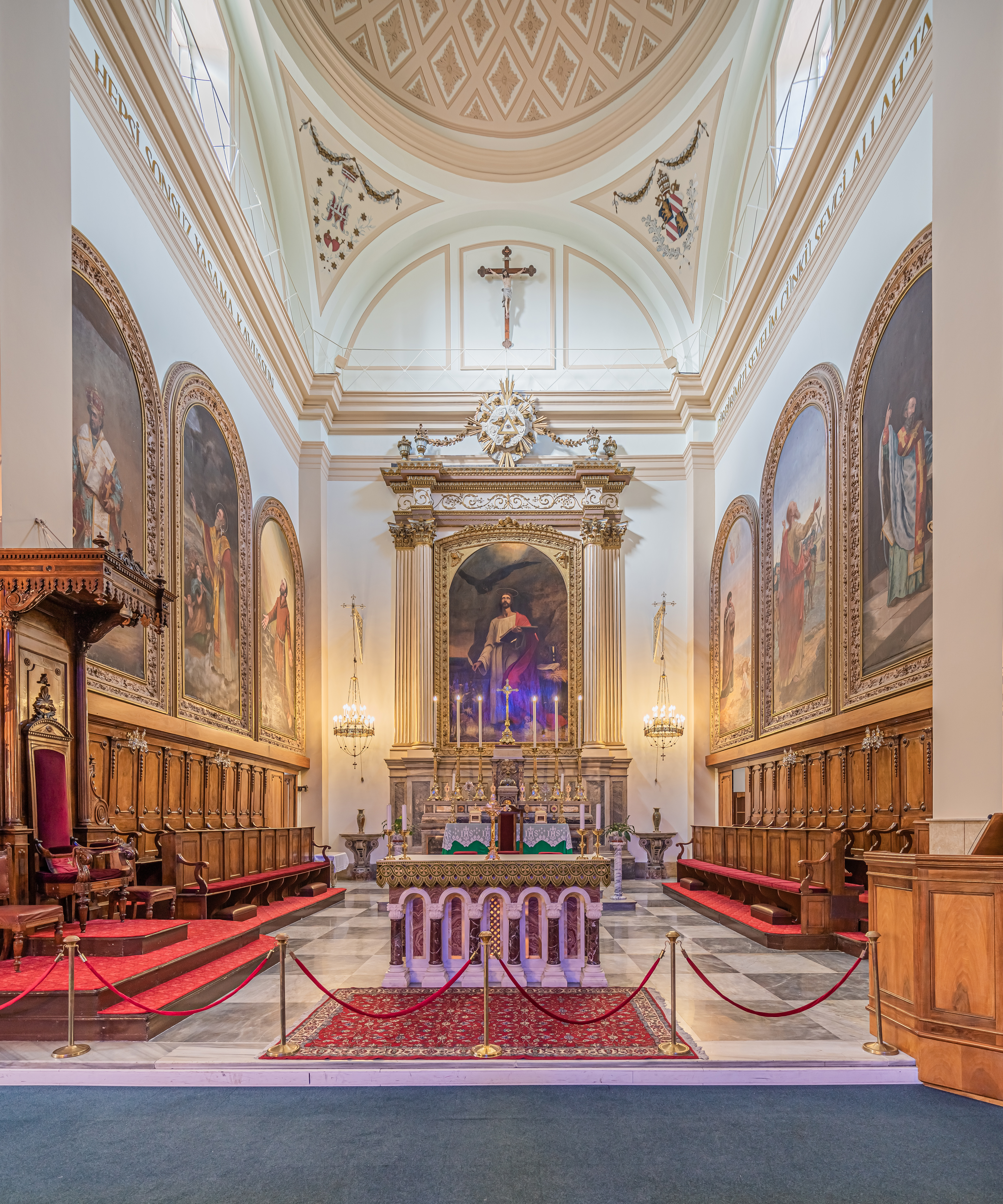
Interior of Saint John's cathedral

The painting over the high altar of the cathedral depicts St. John, with the eagle as his liturgical symbol. He is pictured with pen and scroll writing his Gospel. The painting is autographed by its artist, A. Von Kramer.

The other pictures in the sanctuary area are (on right) St. Augustine, St. Andrew, and St. Athanasius; (on left St. Polycarp, 2nd-century Bishop of Smyrna and martyr for Christ) and St. John Chrysostom. One panel is blank because the original painting was destroyed by fire early in this century.

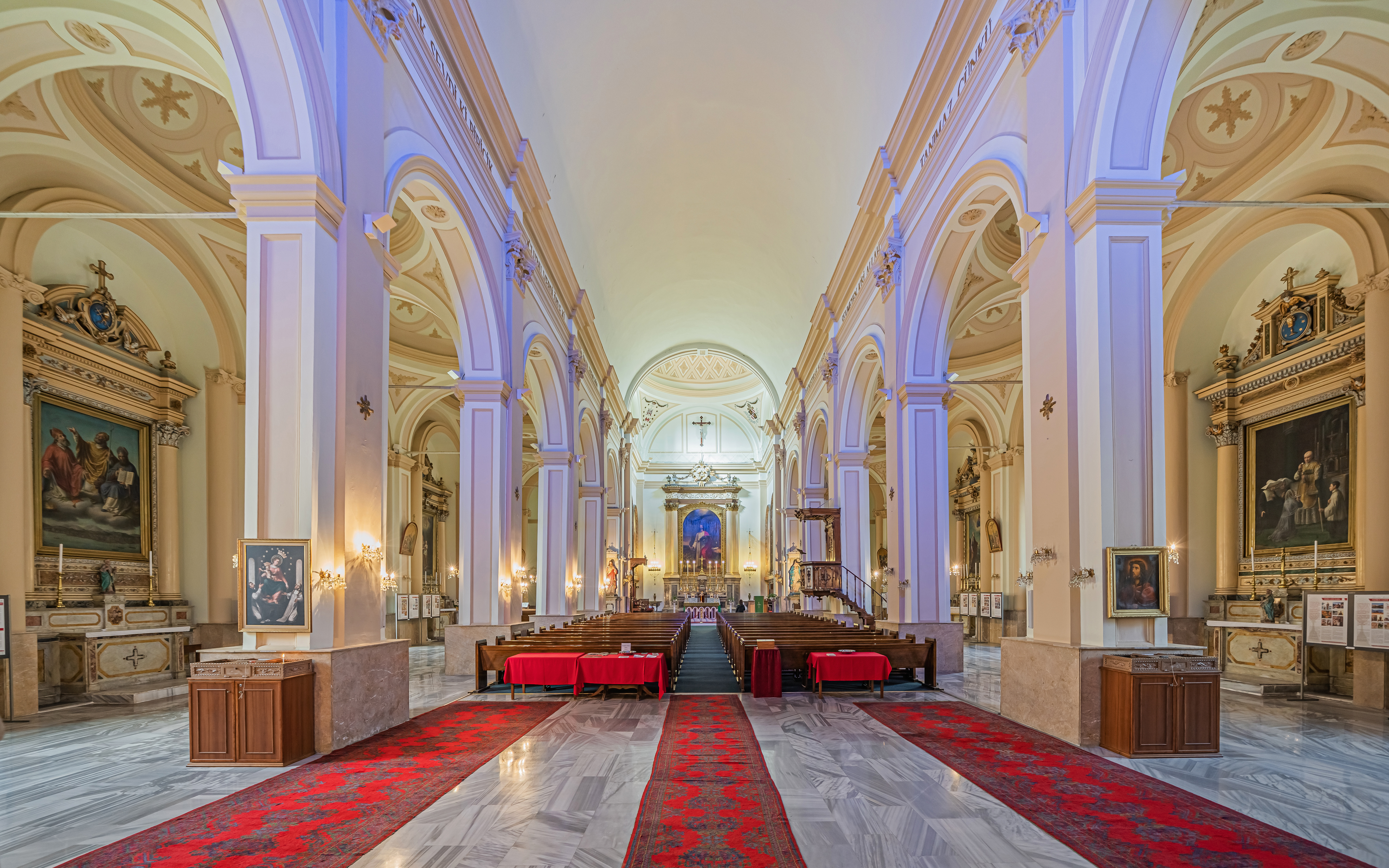
Wider Interior of St. John's Cathedral

Additional paintings in the cathedral are as follows: to the right of the main entrance - St. Vincent de Paul giving Holy Communion to children. The second painting on the right is St. Peter and St. Paul.

To the left of the main entrance, the first painting is of three early bishops of this area: Ignatius of Antioch (Antakya); Polycarp of Smyrna and Irenaeus, priest of Smyrna, who went to Lyon in France and became bishop there. The background for the picture of these bishops is the artist's conception of what ancient Smyrna looked like. (Note: Irenaeus was the Bishop of Lyon who wrote that Polycarp of Smyrna was martyred near the Agora about the year 150 and that he had received his instruction in Christianity from the Apostles.) The other picture is of St. Anne, mother of the Virgin Mary.

Mounted over the inside of the cathedral entrance is a painting which depicts seven bishops of the seven churches of the Apocalypse. This painting, originally done for the Sacrament Chapel at Cigli Air Base, was brought to the cathedral in May 1970.

About 30 feet from the floor on the left and right of the cathedral are small medallion portraits of three bishops and three popes who helped in the construction of the cathedral: (on right) Anthony Mussabini, bishop here 1838–1861, Vincent Spaccapietra 1862–1878; and Andrew Timoni 1879–1904. (on left) The papal portraits are of Gregory XVI 1831–1846; Pius IX 1846–1878; and Leo XIII 1878–1903.

Memorial tombs to Bishops Mussabini and Spaccapietra are located in the garden of the cathedral on the left and right respectively. They were carved by Carrara artists.

As worshipers enter the cathedral grounds from Sehit Nevres Bulvari, they notice the initials D.O.M. above the main entrance on the facade of the cathedral. They are abbreviations for the Latin Deo optimo maximo "To the honor of God, the best, the greatest."

On the left of the main entrance is the dedicatory plaque for the building. Somewhat freely translated it says: <quote>This temple, (built) to honor St. John, Apostle and writer, (had) its cornerstone laid on 26 November 1862. Thanks (are given) for the generous offerings by (local) citizens and contributions by foreigners. Pope Pius IX, in the 27th year of his long pontificate granted it the high honor (of being) a Minor Basilica, and enriched it with the same indulgences as that of St. John Lateran Basilica (in Rome). He (also) donated the high altar, with its precious stones and metals.

Vincent Spaccapietra, Vincentian priest, Archbishop of Smyrna and Victor Apostolic to Asia Minor and the Kingdom of Greece, dedicated it on 25 June 1874, the 27th anniversary of (his ordination to) the priesthood. (Present were) Lawrence Berceretti, Archbishop of Nazos: Fidelis Abate, Bishop of Santorino: John Marengo, Bishop of Tinos.

The Baptistry, on the right of the main entrance, was not outfitted until 1916; as the dedicatory plaque tells. A local resident named John Moriconi was its donor. A priest by the name of Peter Longinotti was rector of the cathedral at this time.

The side chapels of the cathedral are dedicated to St. Joseph (the present sacrament chapel) and to Our Lady of Sorrows.

High above the sanctuary area, near the ceiling of the building, is a triangle with an eye in the center. The triangle is the symbol of the Blessed Trinity, and the eye represents the "All-seeing, all knowing wisdom of God."

== See also ==
- Levantines (Latin Christians)
