= Murder of Luigi Padovese =

2010 murder in Turkey

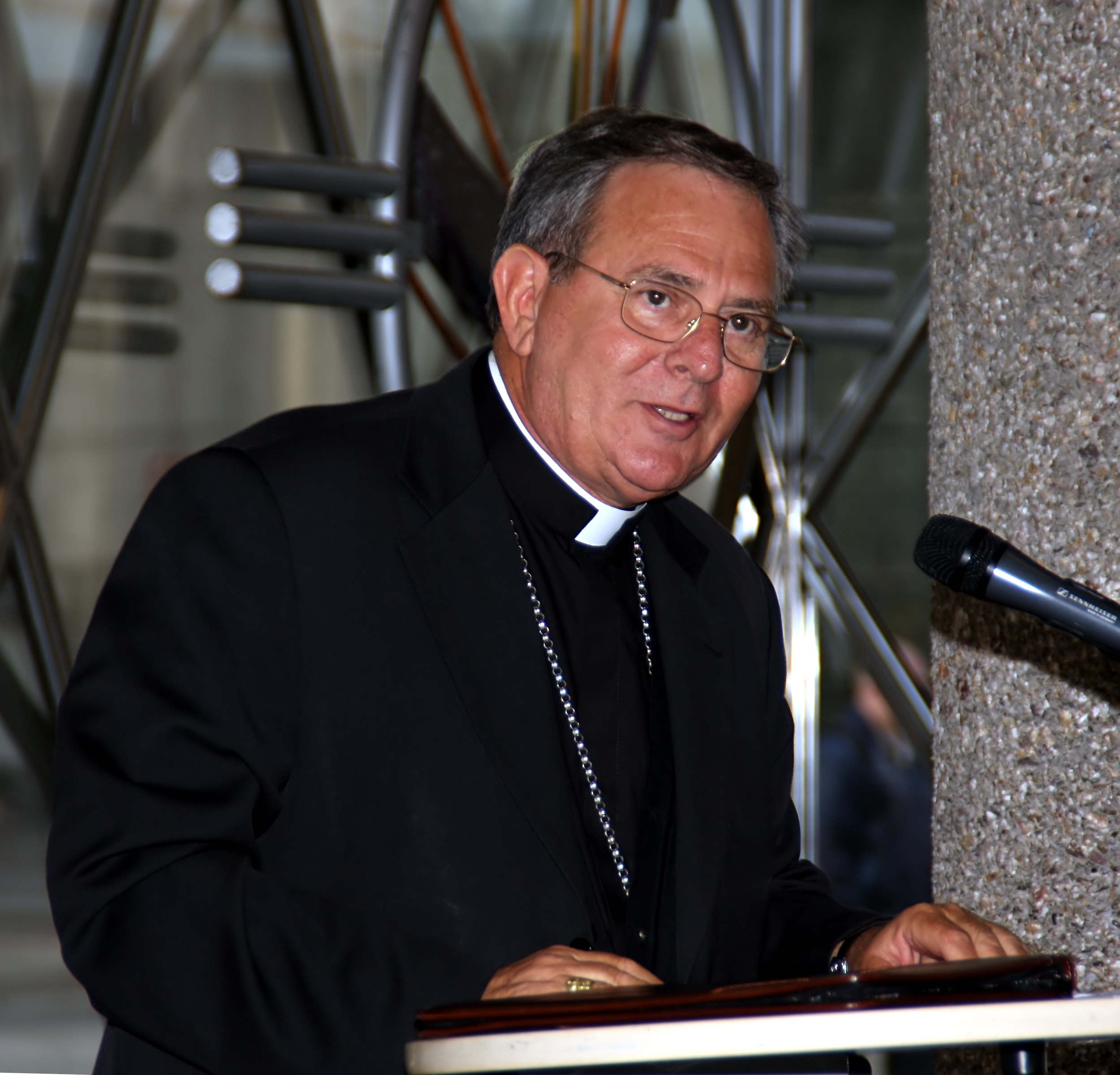
Luigi Padovese April 2009 at a talk in Cologne, Germany

Luigi Padovese (31 March 1947 – 3 June 2010) was an Italian prelate of the Catholic Church who became a bishop and served as the Apostolic Vicar of Anatolia in Turkey. He was a Franciscan and a scholar who devoted most of his career to teaching and guiding seminarians. He was murdered in Turkey by his driver on 3 June 2010.

== Biography ==
Padovese was born in Milan on 31 March 1947. He made his simple vows in the Order of Friars Minor Capuchin on 4 October 1965 and his solemn vows on 4 October 1968. He was ordained a priest on 16 June 1973. He studied at the Pontifical University Antonianum and Pontifical Gregorian University. He was taught patristics at the Pontifical University Antonianum, and for sixteen years he directed the Spirituality Institute at that university. He also held chairs at the Pontifical Gregorian University and Pontifical Alphonsian Academy and taught at various seminaries. He was appointed Apostolic Vicar of Anatolia on 11 October 2004 and consecrated a bishop on 7 November 2004. He was also the president of Caritas Turkey.

== Murder ==
Padovese was fatally stabbed in his summer residence in southern Turkey on 3 June 2010, and according to some reports he died en route to a hospital in the town of Iskenderun later that day. The attacker allegedly recited the takbir (Allahu Akbar) during the attack and then decapitated Padovese, the court heard. Catholic officials, including the Apostolic Nuncio to Turkey Antonio Lucibello and papal spokesman Father Federico Lombardi, expressed "shock and sorrow" over Padovese's death.

Turkish police identified Murat Altun, Padovese's driver for the previous four and half years, who had been receiving treatment for psychological disorders, as their principal suspect. Padovese had recently been warned by the government, which had originally connected Padovese and Altun, that Altun had embraced religious fundamentalism and on that basis Padovese had canceled plans to visit Cyprus during Pope Benedict's visit rather than put Altun near the Pope. Police detained Altun on 3 June. Altun said that he killed Padovese on a wahy (revelation) that identified Padovese as Dajjal or false Messiah and recited the adhan loudly during his initial trial. Turkish police believed the murder was not politically motivated.

=== Sentencing ===
On 22 January 2013, Altun was sentenced by an İskenderun court to 15 years imprisonment. Altun's lawyer later said that Altun can be kept in prison for 10 years and pointed out that Altun had already been in prison for 4 years. He said Altun would eventually be transferred to a low security prison where he will be allowed to leave for limited periods.

== See also ==
- Attempted assassination of Pope John Paul II
- Murder of Andrea Santoro
- Zirve Publishing House murders
- Christianity in Turkey
