= Caritas Hellas =

Catholic charity organization in Greece

- Κάριτας Ελλάς
- Established: May 1980; 45 years ago (founded) — 1994; 32 years ago (registered)
- Type: Nonprofit
- Purpose: social justice
- Location: Athens, Greece
- Coordinates: 37.9870°N 23.7272°E
- Origins: Catholic Social Teaching
- Services: social services, humanitarian relief, advocacy
- Official language: Greek, English
- President: Msgr. Antonios Voutsinos
- Affiliations: Caritas Europa, Caritas Internationalis
- Revenue: 3.611.278,90 EUR (2023)
- Expenses: 3.956.035,15 EUR (2023)
- Website: caritas.gr/en/

Caritas Hellas (Greek: Κάριτας Ελλάς) is a not-for-profit social welfare and humanitarian organisation in Greece. It is a service of the Catholic Church in Greece and a member of both Caritas Europa and Caritas Internationalis.

== History ==
Between 1941 and 1980, Theia Pronoia (Greek: Η Θεία Πρόνοια; "The Divine Providence"), a charitable organisation of the Greek Catholic Exarchate, was the only structured social arm of the Catholic Church in Greece. It was also the Greek member of the Caritas Internationalis confederation. Between 1976 and 1980, first steps were undertaken to coordinate and organise the Catholic charitable work at a national level. In May 1980, the Greek episcopal conference founded Caritas Hellas and recognised it as the official organisation responsible for the Church's ministry of charity on a parish, diocesan and national level.

Caritas Hellas has been existing in its current form since 1994, when it adopted its legal statutes and was registered as a non-profit NGO with the Greek State.

== Structure ==
Caritas Hellas follows the structure of the Catholic Church in Greece. The organisations consists of a national organisation (Caritas Hellas) and 11 local Caritas organisations. Every Caritas organisation is an autonomous organisation. The national office is based in Athens.

The local Caritas structures coordinate the activities of Caritas organisations in the territory that they are responsible for, mostly a specific dioceses. They also provide services, but at a smaller scale.

The 11 local structures of Caritas Hellas are:

- Caritas Athens (Archdiocese of Athens)
- Caritas for Armenian Catholics (Ordinariate for Catholics of Armenian Rite)
- Caritas Thessaloniki (Apostolic Vicariate of Thessaloniki)
- Caritas Theia Pronoia ("Divine Providence"; Greek Catholic Apostolic Exarchate)
- Caritas Corfu (Archdiocese of Corfu, Zakynthos, and Cephalonia
- Caritas Crete (Diocese of Crete)
- Caritas Naxos-Tinos (Archdiocese of Naxos, Tinos, Andros and Mykonos)
- Caritas Rhodes (Archdiocese of Rhodes)
- Caritas Santorini (Diocese of Santorini)
- Caritas Syros (Diocese of Syros)
- Caritas Chios (Diocese of Chios)

In addition, there are also some small Caritas organisations at parish level.

== Work ==
Between 2013 and 2021, Caritas Hellas supported more than half a million people through its various programmes.

Following the onset of the Greek government-debt crisis and the resulting economic turmoil, the organisation began addressing basic needs such as food, medicine, and monthly electricity bills for thousands of families. Since the 2015 European migrant crisis, Caritas Hellas has been heavily involved in providing humanitarian aid to people migrating to or through Greece. Its initial response included the distribution of food, shoes, and hygiene items, while its longer-term efforts focused on providing psychosocial and translation support in the Kara Tepe refugee camp on Lesvos Island.

The Adama Center, operated in collaboration with Catholic Relief Services and UNHCR, provides in-person and remote integration services. These include information about the Greek labour market, job counselling, assistance with job opportunities, and support in collecting the necessary documentation to apply for welfare allowances. These services are aimed at asylum seekers and beneficiaries of international and temporary protection living in Greece.

In addition to its direct aid to migrants, asylum seekers, and refugees, Caritas Hellas is active in advocacy, working to defend their rights.

Caritas Hellas also provides regular assistance to victims of local disasters, such as the 2007 Greek forest fires and the 2018 Attica wildfires.

The organisation's work is funded through grants from other Caritas organisations, including Caritas Germany, Caritas Italy, Caritas Spain, and Catholic Relief Services. Additional funding comes from European Union programmes such as Erasmus+, as well as grants from United Nations agencies, including UNHCR and IOM. Local foundations also contribute to supporting the work of Caritas Hellas.
