= Holy Synod of Catholic Bishops of Greece =

Assembly of Catholic bishops

The Holy Synod of Catholic Bishops of Greece (Greek: Ιερά Σύνοδος της Καθολικής Εκκλησίας της Ελλάδος, Iera synodos tis Katholikis Ekklisias tis Ellados) is the Episcopal Conference (association of Catholic bishops) in Greece. It is a member of the Council of European Bishops' Conferences and sends a representative to the Commission of the Bishops' Conferences of the European Community (COMECE).

== President ==
- Theodoros Kontidis, Archbishop of Athens and Apostolic Administrator for the Roman Catholic Archdiocese of Rhodes.

== Members ==
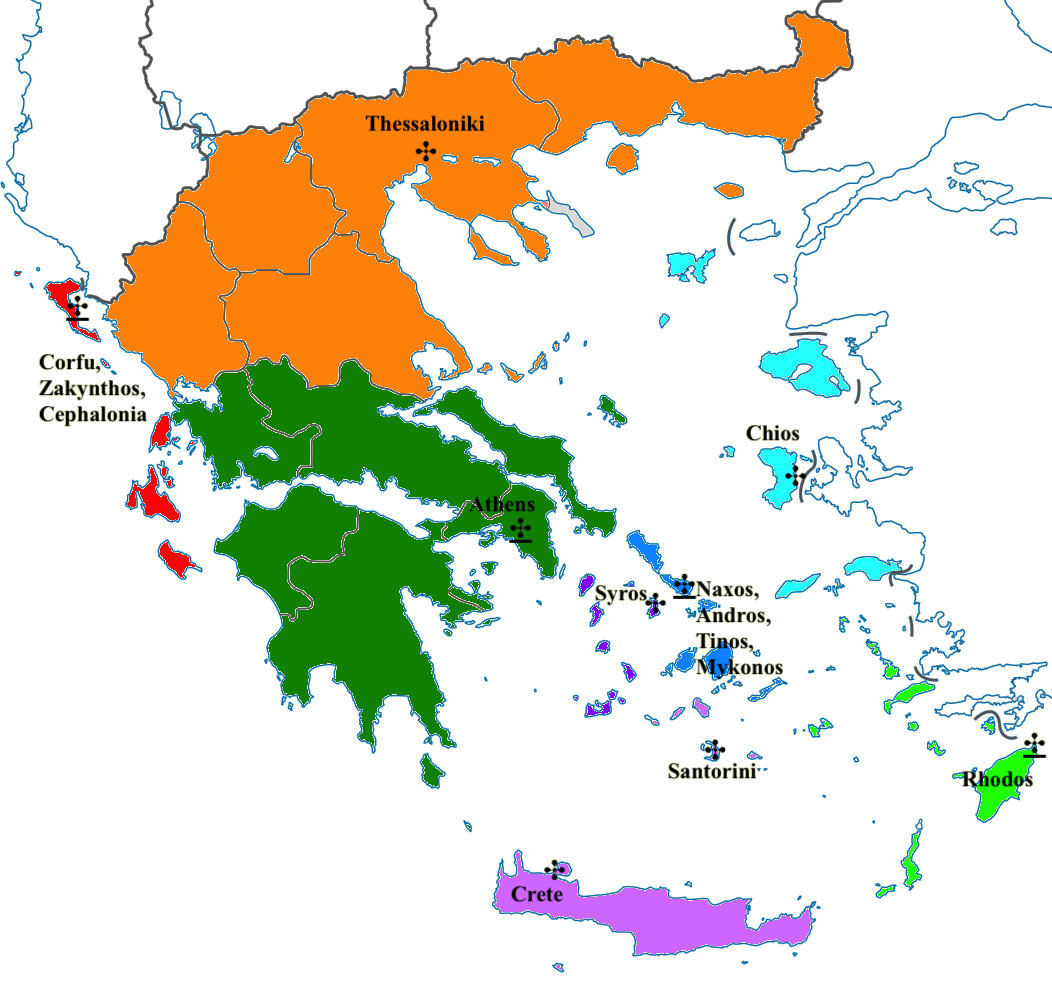
Catholic Dioceses in Greece

- Josif Printezis, Archbishop and Metropolitan of Naxos, Andros, Tinos and Mykonos and Apostolic Administrator of the Roman Catholic Diocese of Chios.
- Georgios Altouvas, Archbishop and Metropolitan of Corfu, Zante, Cephalonia and Apostolic Administrator for the Apostolic Vicariate of Thessaloniki.
- Manuel Nin, Titular Bishop of Carcabia and Apostolic Exarch of Greece (Byzantine Rite)
- Petros Stefanou, Bishop of Syros and Milos, Santorini, apostolic administrator for the Roman Catholic Diocese of Crete

== See also ==
- Catholic Church in Greece
