= Georgios Xenopoulos =

Greek Jesuit and Catholic prelate (1898–1980)

The Right Reverend Georgios Xenopoulos SJ
- Bishop of Syros; Bishop of Santorini; Apostolic Administrator of Crete
- Native name: Γεώργιος Ξενόπουλος
- Church: Roman Catholic Church
- Diocese: Syros; Santorini; Crete
- Appointed: 22 February 1947 (Syros & Santorini); 1952 (Crete)
- Term ended: 27 June 1974
- Predecessor: Timotheos Georgios Raymoundos, OFM Cap (Syros & Santorini); Arsenio da Corfù, OFM Cap (Crete)
- Successor: Frangiskos Papamanolis, OFM Cap

Orders
- Ordination: 31 July 1926
- Consecration: 20 July 1947 by Giovanni Francesco Filippucci

Personal details
- Born: Γεώργιος Ξενόπουλος; 23 August 1898 Syros, Greece
- Died: 28 January 1980 (aged 81) Greece

Ordination history of Georgios Xenopoulos
History
Episcopal consecration
- Principal consecrator: Giovanni Francesco Filippucci
- Co-consecrators: Antonio Gregorio Vuccino, AA; George Calavassy
Episcopal succession
Bishops consecrated by Georgios Xenopoulos as principal consecrator
- Marios Makrionitis, SJ: 11 March 1953
- Ioannis Perris: 12 January 1961
- Frangiskos Papamanolis, OFM Cap: 20 October 1974

Georgios Xenopoulos, SJ (Greek: Γεώργιος Ξενόπουλος; 23 August 1898 – 28 January 1980) was a Greek Jesuit and prelate of the Catholic Church. From 1947 until his retirement in 1974, he was the Bishop of Santorini and the Bishop of Syros. In addition, he was at various times the apostolic administrator of the Archdiocese of Athens, the Diocese of Crete, and the Apostolic Vicariate of Salonica. He died in 1980, aged 81.

== Biography ==
Xenopoulos was born on 23 August 1898 in Syros, Greece. He joined the Society of Jesus and was ordained to the priesthood on 31 July 1926.

On 22 February 1947, Xenopulos was appointed Bishop of Syros and Bishop of Santorini by Pope Pius XII. His episcopal consecration took place on 20 July 1947, with the Archbishop of Naxos, Tinos, Andros and Mykonos, Giovanni Francesco Filippucci, as principal consecrator, and Archbishop Antonios Grigorios Voutsinos, AA, and Bishop George Calavassy serving as co-consecrators. From 1950 to 1953, he was apostolic administrator of the Archdiocese of Athens and the Apostolic Vicariate of Salonica (now Thessaloniki). In 1952, he was additionally appointed apostolic administrator of the Diocese of Crete, a position he held until his death.

From 1963 to 1965, Xenopulos participated in all four sessions of the Second Vatican Council. He was noted for addressing the concept of opening Communion under both kinds (e.g. bread and wine; the wine had previously been restricted to priests). Regarding the reception of wine through a common chalice, he raised concerns about health and women's lipstick, saying:

"Today the faithful, especially men, can be seen not to come forward to kiss a sacred relic because, among other things, they fear their lips will be colored by the red marks left by women on the glass of the reliquary. What will happen now when so many hundreds and thousands of dyed lips of women or perhaps hundreds of lips of men which are not proper and pure and sometimes are infected with base sicknesses are applied to the rims of the chalice? The result will be that many of the faithful will abstain from Communion."

Yves Congar, the French Dominican theologian, took notice of Xenopulos at the Council, writing in his book My Journey of the Council about Xenopulos, "the name is Greek, but his pronunciation of Latin was typically and entirely Italian."

During his tenure as bishop, Xenopulos consecrated a number of bishops. He was principal consecrator of Archbishop of Athens Marios Makrionitis in 1953, of Archbishop of Naxos, Tinos, Andros and Mykonos Ioánnis Perrís in 1961, and Bishop of Syros and Santorini Frangiskos Papamanolis, OFM Cap, in 1974. He was co-consecrator of Archbishop Marcus Sigala in 1947, Bishop Hyakinthos Gad in 1958, Archbishop Venediktos Printesis in 1959, Archbishop Antonios Varthalitis, AA, in 1962, and Archbishop Nikolaos Foskolos in 1973.

Xenopulos died on 28 January 1980, aged 81.

== Episcopal lineage ==
- Cardinal Scipione Rebiba
- Cardinal Giulio Antonio Santorio (1566)
- Cardinal Girolamo Bernerio, OP (1586)
- Archbishop Galeazzo Sanvitale (1604)
- Cardinal Ludovico Ludovisi (1621)
- Cardinal Luigi Caetani (1622)
- Cardinal Ulderico Carpegna (1630)
- Cardinal Paluzzo Paluzzi Altieri degli Albertoni (1666)
- Pope Benedict XIII (1675)
- Pope Benedict XIV (1724)
- Pope Clement XIII (1743)
- Cardinal Marco Antonio Colonna (1762)
- Cardinal Hyacinthe Sigismond Gerdil, CRSP (1777)
- Cardinal Giulio Maria della Somaglia (1788)
- Cardinal Carlo Odescalchi, SJ (1823)
- Bishop Eugène de Mazenod, OMI (1832)
- Archbishop Joseph-Hippolyte Guibert, OMI (1842)
- Cardinal François-Marie-Benjamin Richard (1872)
- Cardinal Pietro Gasparri (1898)
- Archbishop Angelo Rotta (1922)
- Archbishop Giovanni Francesco Filippucci (1927)
- Bishop Georges Xenopulos, SJ (1947)
