= Apostolic Vicariate of Thessaloniki =

Latin Catholic missionary jurisdiction in Greece

Coordinates: 40.6374°N 22.9384°E

Apostolic Vicariate of Thessaloniki Apostolicus Vicariatus Thessalonicensis Αποστολικό Βικαριάτο Θεσσαλονίκης

Catholic
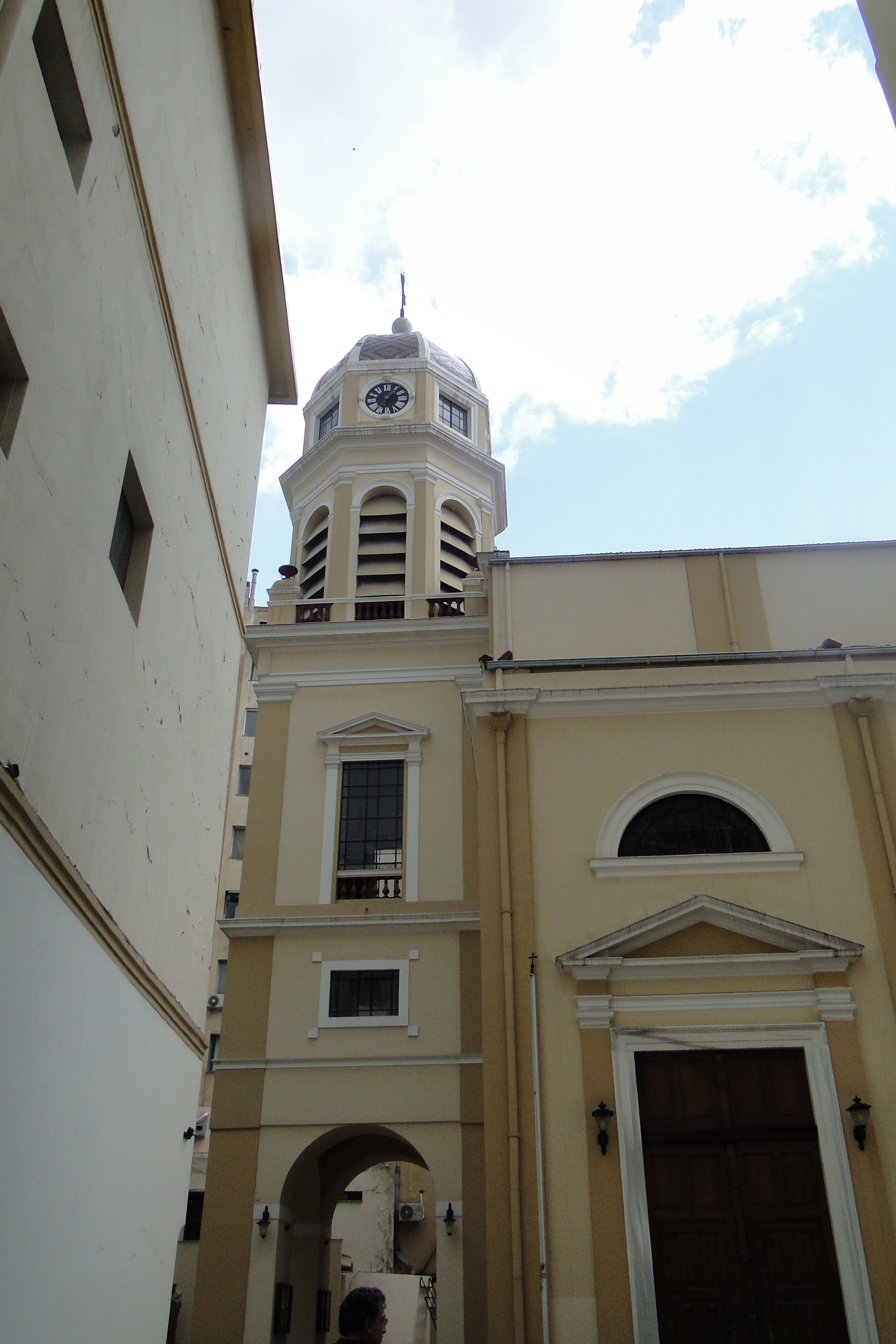
- Immaculate Conception Cathedral, Thessaloniki

- Coat of arms of Bishop Georgios Altouvas

Location
- Country: Greece
- Ecclesiastical province: Immediately exempt to the Holy See

Statistics
- Area: 57,550 km^{2} (22,220 sq mi)
- Population: Total; Catholics: (as of 2010); 3,574,000; 8,100 (0.2%)

Information
- Denomination: Catholic Church
- Sui iuris church: Latin Church
- Rite: Roman Rite
- Established: 18 March 1926
- Cathedral: Immaculate Conception Cathedral, Thessaloniki

Current leadership
- Pope: Leo XIV
- Bishop: Sede Vacante

Website
- https://cathecclesia.gr/apostolic-vicariate-of-thessalonica/

The Apostolic Vicariate of Thessaloniki (Latin: Vicariatus Apostolicus Thessalonicensis) is a Latin Church ecclesiastical territory or apostolic vicariate of the Catholic Church in northern continental Greece.

It is exempt to the Holy See and is not part of any ecclesiastical province, and remains vacant under apostolic administrators since its only proper apostolic vicar, Alessandro Guidati, was promoted Archbishop of Naxos, Andros, Tinos and Mykonos in 1929.

Its cathedra is within the Cathedral of the Immaculate Conception, in Thessaloniki.

== History ==
In the 13th century, during the Kingdom of Thessalonica, a Latin-rite archdiocese of Thessalonica (Archidioecesis Thessalonicensis) was founded which later became a titular see in the following century. It is formally extant, but vacant since 1967 (the last titular archbishop was Carlo Grano, later cardinal).

The vicariate was established in 1926 as Apostolic Vicariate of Thessalonica, by Pope Pius XI in the apostolic brief "In sublimi Principis", from canonical territory split off from the Roman Catholic Apostolic Vicariate of Constantinople, comprising the Greek prefectures of Thessaloniki, Kavala, Xanthi, Volos, Larisa and Giannitsa. Since then, the Vicariate covers the entire territory of northern Greece, including regions of Greek Macedonia, Greek Thrace and Thessaly.

Upon the renaming of the episcopal see of Thessaloniki, the territory was renamed in 1992 as Apostolic Vicariate of Thessaloniki (Greek: Θεσσαλονίκη).

== Presence ==
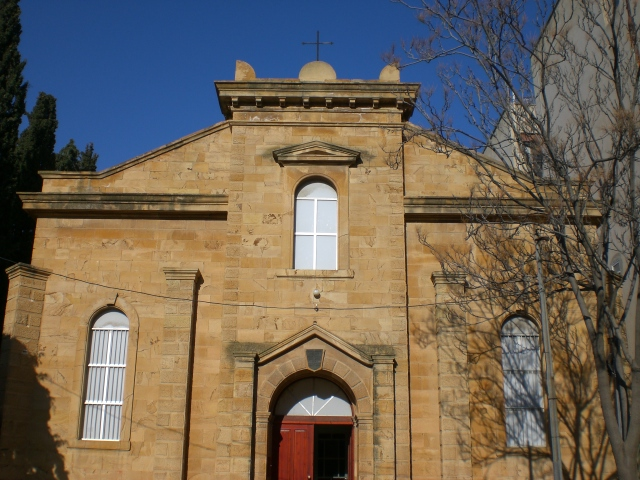
St Joseph's Church, Alexandroupoli

In 2014, it served 7,376 Catholics (0.2% of the local population) on 57,550 km^{2} in 4 parishes and 4 missions with 10 priests (3 diocesan, 7 religious) and 16 lay religious (9 brothers, 7 sisters).

Those churches include:

- Immaculate Conception Cathedral in Thessaloniki
- Sacred Heart of Jesus Church in Larissa
- Immaculate Conception Church in Volos
- St. Paul's Church in Kavala
- St. Joseph's Church in Xanthi
- St. Joseph's Church in Alexandroupoli

== Episcopal ordinaries ==
Apostolic Vicars of Salonica

1. Alessandro Guidati † (30 April 1927 – 15 July 1929), Titular Bishop of Adada (1927.04.30 – 1929.07.15); later Metropolitan Archbishop of the Archdiocese of Naxos, Andros, Tinos and Mykonos (insular Greece) (1929.07.15 – retired 1947.02.22), Apostolic Administrator of Chios (insular Greece) (1939 – 1947.02.22), emeritate as Titular Archbishop of Nicopolis in Epiro (1947.02.22 – death 1952.06.25)

"Temporary" Apostolic administrators during the long see vacancy since 1929

1. Giovanni Battista Filippucci (1929 – 1947), while Archbishop of Athens (peninsular Greece) (1927.02.24 – 1947.05.29); later Metropolitan Archbishop of Naxos–Andros–Tinos–Mykonos (insular Greece) (1947.05.29 – death 1959.11.06) and Apostolic Administrator of Chios (insular Greece) (1947.05.29 – 1959.11.06)
2. Marco Sigala (1947 – 1950), while Archbishop of Athens (peninsular Greece) (1947.05.29 – death 1950.03.10); previously Apostolic Administrator of Santorini (insular Greece) (1946 – 1947)
3. Georges Xenopulos, Jesuits (S.J.) (1950 – 1953), also Apostolic Administrator of Crete (insular Greece) (1952 – 1974.06.27); previously Bishop of Santorini (insular Greece) (1947.02.22 – 1974.06.27) and Bishop of Syros (insular Greece) (1947.02.22 – 1974.06.27)
4. Marius Macrionitis, S.J. (1952 – death 1959.04.08), also Archbishop of Athens (peninsular Greece) (1953.03.11 – death 1959.04.08)
5. Venedictos Printesis (1959.05.15 – 1962), while Archbishop of Athens (peninsular Greece) (1959.05.15 – retired 1972.11.17), died 2008
6. Father Dimítrios Roussos, S.J. 1969 – 1992), no other prelature
7. Antónios Varthalítis, Assumptionists (A.A.) (1992 – 2003.03.22), while Metropolitan Archbishop of Corfu–Zakynthos–Kefalonia (insular Greece) (1962.05.30 – retired 2003.03.22), died 2007
8. Yannis Spiteris, Capuchin Franciscans (O.F.M. Cap.) (2003.03.22 – 2020.09.14), while Metropolitan Archbishop of Corfu–Zakynthos–Kefalonia (insular Greece) (2003.03.22 – 2020.09.14).
9. Georgios Altouvas (2020.09.14 – ...), while Metropolitan Archbishop of Corfu–Zakynthos–Kefalonia (insular Greece) (2020.09.14 – ...)
