= Marangos =

Marangos (Greek: Μαραγκός) is a Greek surname. Notable people with the surname include:

- Christos Marangos (born 1983), Cypriot footballer
- Ioannis Marangos (1833–1891), Greek Roman Catholic archbishop
- Spiros Marangos (born 1967), Greek footballer
- Stelios Marangos (born 1989), Greek footballer
- Thodoros Marangos (born 1944), Greek film director
