= Sevastianos Rossolatos =

Greek Roman Catholic archbishop (born 1944)

The Most Reverend Sevastianos Rossolatos
- Archbishop of Athens
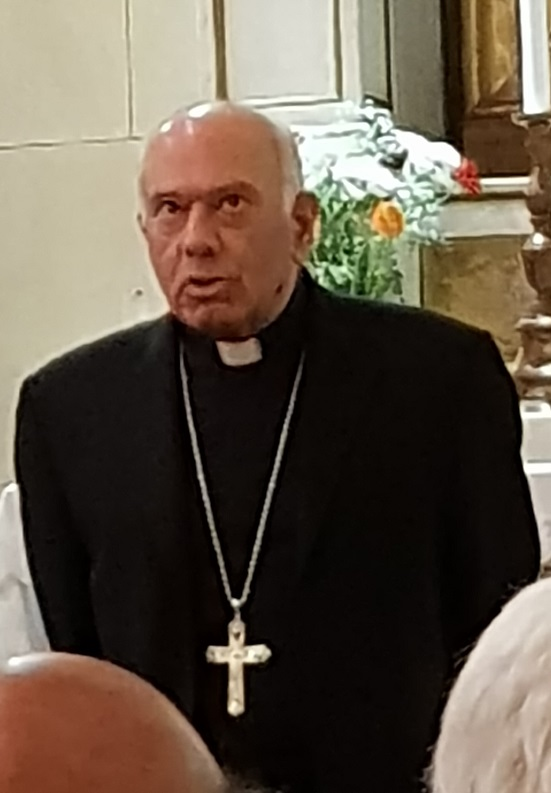
- Native name: Σεβαστιανός Ροσσολάτος
- Church: Roman Catholic Church
- Archdiocese: Athens
- See: Athens
- Appointed: 12 August 2014
- Installed: 25 October 2014
- Term ended: 14 July 2021
- Predecessor: Nikolaos Foskolos
- Successor: Theodoros Kontidis, S.J.
- Other posts: Apostolic Administrator of Rhodes (2014-2021); President of the Greek Episcopal Conference (2016-) Apostolic Administrator of Syros (12 April 2025 -)

Orders
- Ordination: 21 July 1968 by Georgios Xenopoulos
- Consecration: 25 October 2014 by Nikolaos Foskolos

Personal details
- Born: Sevastianos Rossolatos; 19 June 1944 (age 82) Ermoupoli, Greece
- Education: Pontifical Gregorian University

Sevastianos Rossolatos (Greek: Σεβαστιανός Ροσσολάτος; born 19 June 1944) is a Greek Roman Catholic prelate who was Archbishop of the Roman Catholic Archdiocese of Athens and Apostolic Administrator of the Roman Catholic Archdiocese of Rhodes from 2014 to 2021.

== Biography ==
Sevastianos Rossolatos was born on 19 June 1944 at Ermoupoli, on the island of Syros, Greece. Like him, his family was Catholic, part of the ca. 200,000-strong Catholic community of Greece. There Catholics have a rather close relationship with the Orthodox Church, confession more widespread in the country, since the two Christian realities coexist for many centuries, and especially after the Second Vatican Council. There is also the Greek Byzantine Catholic Church, in communion with the bishop of Rome from the nineteenth century, which has about 3,000 faithful in Greece.

== Education and priestly ministry ==
Rossolatos studied initially at the island of Syros, and then continued his education by attending the grammar school at the Greek-French Saint Paul School in Athens, managed the Society of Mary (Marists). He decided to follow his priestly vocation, so in 1962 he moved to Rome as a student at Sant'Atanasio College of the Greek Church and the Pontifical Gregorian University where he earned a BA in philosophy and theology. Then, at the end of six years of stay in Rome, he returned to his homeland, where on 21 July 1968 he was ordained a priest for the Roman Catholic Diocese of Syros and Milos. Rossolatos speaks Italian and French.

He was assigned to carry out the priestly ministry to the Virgin "Faneromeni" Sanctuary in Syros, also becoming the director of the diocesan magazine. Rossolatos has held various positions in the Commissions of the Holy Synod of Catholic Bishops of Greece, in particular liturgical, including: Chancellor of the Curia, a member of the Ecclesiastical Court, and religion teacher at many public schools, contributor to courses in diocesan marriage preparation and member of Committee on Divine Worship.

== Episcopal ministry ==
On 12 August 2014, Pope Francis accepted the resignation of Nikolaos Foskolos as archbishop of the Roman Catholic Archdiocese of Athens and the Roman Catholic Archdiocese of Rhodes and appointed Rossolatos to succeed him. He received his episcopal consecration from Foskolos on 25 October 2014, with co-conservators bishop emeritus of the Roman Catholic diocese of Syros and Mylos Frangiskos Papamanolis and Nikolaos Printesis, archbishop of the Roman Catholic Archdiocese of Naxos, Andros, Tinos and Mykonos.

On 14 July 2021, Pope Francis accepted the resignation of Archbishop Sevastianos Rossolatos from the pastoral governance of the Archdiocese of Athens and his office as Apostolic Administrator of Rhodes, Greece, and appointed Theodoros Kontidis, S.J., as his successor.

On 11 April 2025, Pope Francis accepted the resignation of Bishop Petros Stefanou from the pastoral governance of the Diocese of Syros, Milos and Santorini and from his office as Apostolic Administrator of the Diocese of Crete (Candia), Greece. Archbishop emeritus Sevastianos Rossolatos was appointed Apostolic Administrator sede vacante et ad nutum Sanctae Sedis of the same ecclesiastical jurisdictions until 31 October 2026.
