= Ioannis Perris =

20th century Roman catholic cleric in Greece

- Archbishop of Naxos, Andros, Tinos and Mykonos
- Church: Roman Catholic Church
- Archdiocese: Naxos, Andros, Tinos and Mykonos
- Appointed: 24 October 1960
- Installed: 24 October 1960
- Term ended: 29 April 1993
- Predecessor: Joannis Baptist Filippucci
- Successor: Nikolaos Printesis

Orders
- Ordination: 23 March 1940
- Consecration: 12 January 1961 by Georgios Xenopoulos

Personal details
- Born: Ioannis Perris; 10 October 1916 Syros, Greece
- Died: 20 August 2006 (aged 89)

Ioannis Perris (October 10, 1916 - August 20, 2006) was a Catholic Archbishop of Naxos, Andros, Tinos and Mykonos from October 24, 1960, to April 29, 1993.

== Biography ==
Ioannis Perris was born on October 10, 1916, in Greece. After receiving theological education he was ordained priest on March 23, 1940.

On October 24, 1960 Pope John XXIII appointed Ioannis Perris as Archbishop of Naxos, Andros, Tinos and Minos. On January 12, 1961, he was ordained bishop by the Bishop of Syros and Milos, Georgios Xenopoulos, in collaboration with the Athenian Archbishop Venediktos Printesis and the Bishop of the Apostolic Exarchat of Greece Hyakinthos Gad.

From 1961 to 1964, Perris participated in the I, II, III and IV sessions of the Second Vatican Council.

From 1961 to 1993 he was the apostolic administrator of the diocese of Chios.

He retired on April 29, 1993.

On August 20, 2006, Ioannis Perris passed away.
