= Cathedral Basilica of St. Dionysius the Areopagite =

Catholic cathedral in Athens, Greece

- Καθεδρικός Ναός Αγ. Διονυσίου Αρεοπαγίτου των Καθολικών
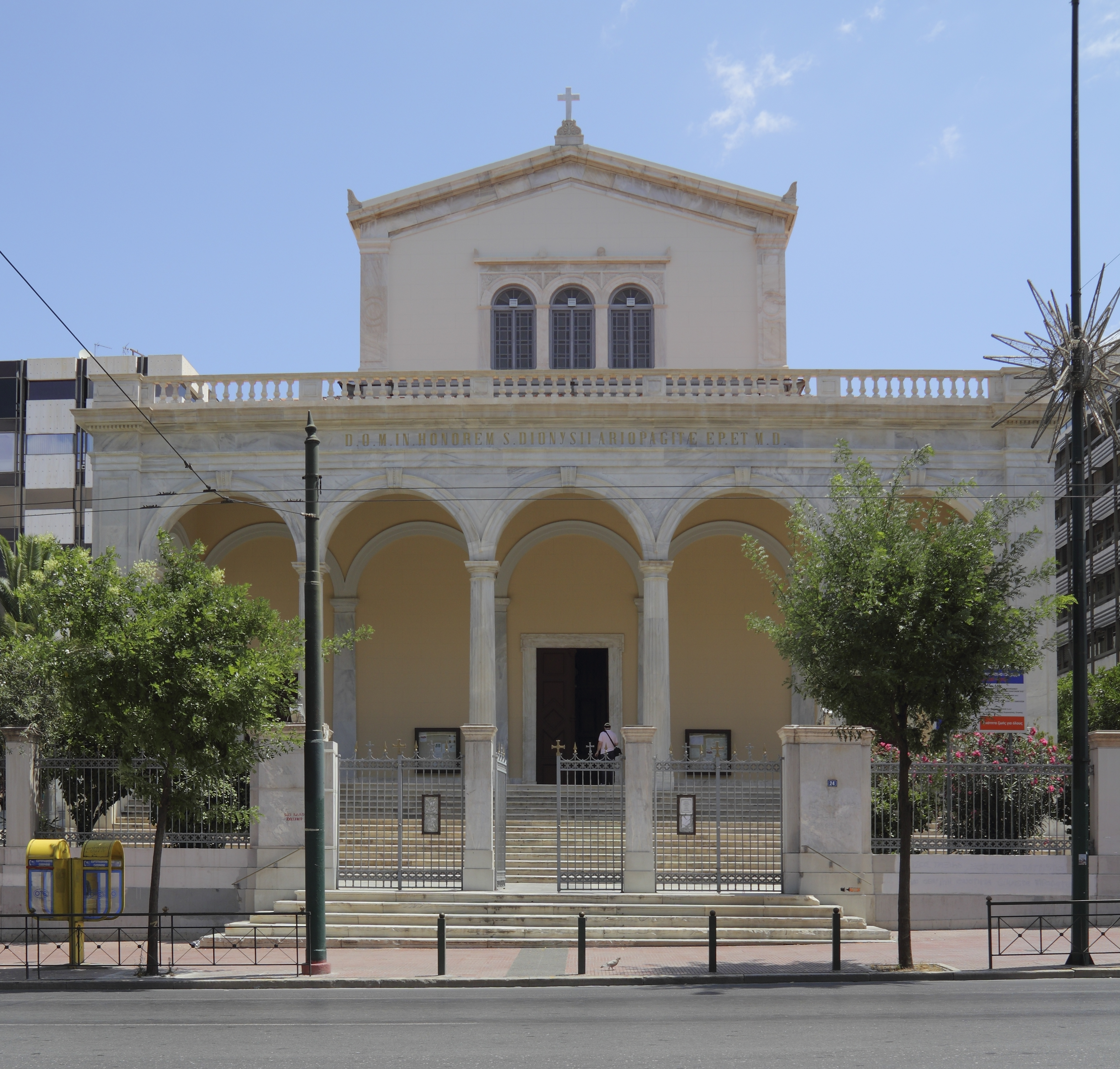
- view of the front entrance from Panepistimiou Ave
- Cathedral Basilica of St. Dionysius the Areopagite
- 37°58′45″N 23°44′04″E
- Location: Athens
- Address: Panepistimiou 24
- Country: Greece
- Denomination: Catholic
- Sui iuris church: Latin Church
- Tradition: Roman Rite
- Website: https://saintdenis.gr/en/

History
- Status: Minor Basilica; Cathedral
- Dedication: Saint Dionysius the Areopagite
- Events: 1869: Emperor Franz Joseph I of Austria visit; 1962: Wedding of Prince Juan Carlos and Princess Sophia; 2001: Pope John Paul II visit; 2021: Pope Francis visit

Architecture
- Heritage designation: Greek Ministry of Culture, ΥΠΠΕ/ΔΙΛΑΠ/Γ/2157/45535
- Designated: 20 August 1981
- Architects: Leo von Klenze; Lysandros Kaftanzoglou
- Architectural type: three-aisled basilica
- Style: Renaissance Revival
- Years built: 1847: Land purchased for the cathedral; 1853: Construction began and nave completed; 1860: Ceremonial groundbreaking; 1865: Ceremonial opening; 1875: Papal bull issued, formally
- Groundbreaking: 1860; 166 years ago
- Completed: August 4, 1865; 161 years ago

Specifications
- Length: 38 meters
- Width: 24 meters
- Height: 15 meters
- Materials: Pentelic marble; green marble from Tinos; brick

Administration
- Metropolis: Immediately exempt to the Holy See
- Archdiocese: Archdiocese of Athens

Clergy
- Archbishop: Theodoros Kontidis

The Cathedral Basilica of St. Dionysius the Areopagite is the main Catholic church of Athens, Greece, and the seat of the Catholic Archbishop of Athens. It is located in central Athens, at the junction of Panepistimiou Avenue with Omirou Street and is dedicated to Saint Dionysius the Areopagite, disciple of the Apostle Saint Paul and the first bishop of Athens.

== History ==
The Cathedral Basilica of St. Dionysius the Areopagite is the principal Roman Catholic church in Athens, and has been since the mid-19th century. Although historical records indicate that previous Catholic cathedrals existed in the city prior to the modern era, little is known about the architecture or exact administration of these ancient structures. The current cathedral, situated prominently on Panepistimiou Avenue, is a neo-Renaissance basilica that was constructed in the mid-19th century.

=== Brief history of previous cathedrals ===
The history of the Archdiocese of Athens traces its origins to the early Christian community established by Paul the Apostle around 51 AD, until the Great Schism of 1054 aligned the Christian community in Athens with the Eastern Orthodox Church. A distinct Latin rite Archdiocese was officially erected on 27 November 1205, following the Fourth Crusade, when Frankish crusaders conquered Athens and controversially converted the Orthodox Cathedral in the Parthenon into the Catholic Cathedral. This Catholic cathedral in the Parthenon and the medieval Latin diocese operated for over 250 years during the era of the Duchy of Athens but was suppressed and reduced to a titular see following the Ottoman conquest of Athens in 1458, plunging the local Catholic administrative presence into almost four centuries of dormancy.

=== Current cathedral ===
Following the Greek War of Independence and the subsequent influx of Catholics into Athens, Pope Pius IX officially restored the modern Archdiocese of Athens in the mid-1800s, designating the Cathedral Basilica of St. Dionysius the Areopagite as its seat.

The land for the construction of the church was purchased in 1847 with money collected among the Catholics of Greece, which was undeveloped countryside outside the old Ottoman-era town. Funds for the building were provided by fundraisers among Catholics both inside and outside Greece. The nave was built in 1853 and the ceremonial inauguration took place on 4 August 1865.

=== Notable historic events ===
On 14 May 1962, the marriage of Princess Sophia, the eldest daughter of King Paul of Greece and Queen Frederica of Greece, and Infante Juan Carlos of Spain, the exiled heir to the Spanish throne, took place in the basilica, which preceded the Orthodox wedding rites.

The basilica has been visited by two popes, Pope John Paul II in 2001 and Pope Francis in 2021.

== Architecture ==
The cathedral is a three-aisle basilica in the neo-Renaissance style. The German architect Leo von Klenze drafted the plans for the cathedral at the behest of King Otto of Greece. The architecture is influenced by St Boniface's Abbey in Munich. During the project, the plans were modified by the Greek architect Lysandros Kaftanzoglou, who offered to direct the work of the church, until completion, without any remuneration.

=== Restorations ===
Between 1992 and 1998, the Cathedral underwent exterior and interior restoration. The restoration project was guided by an architectural study conducted by Greek architect Giannis Kizis.

The 6.0 magnitude earthquake in September 1999 caused significant structural and cosmetic damage to both the interior and exterior, which necessitated structural reinforcement and its restoration.

== Interior ==
The church is 38 meters long, 15 meters high and 24 meters wide. The church's interior is decorated with frescoes. Of the most prominent is the fresco of semi-domes of triumphal arch, representing the Apotheosis of Saint Dionysius the Areopagite (1890) and is the work of Italian painter of Guglielmo Bilancioni. The pillars, which support the triumphal arch, represent in life-size the four Evangelists. In front of the triumphal arch is depicted Christ Pantocrator with the Gospel in hand. In the adjacent corner on the right is Moses holding a parchment, and on the left the Prophet David playing a harp. Below are Saint Gregory the Great and Saint Augustine. The church floor is paved with Pentelic marble.

The nave is supported by 12 columns of green marble from Tinos. The bases and capitals of these Tuscan-style columns are carved from Pentelic marble. Originally, sixteen columns were quarried in Tinos and intended for the construction of the royal palace; however, following a change in architectural plans, they were redirected to the Cathedral.

In November 1869, Emperor Franz Joseph I of Austria visited Athens and the basilica while en route to the opening of the Suez Canal. To commemorate his visit, the Emperor donated the two marble pulpits that currently stand to the right and left of the chancel.

=== Stained glass windows ===
The lower register of the church is illuminated by eight stained glass windows, four on each side of the nave. These were crafted by the renowned German stained-glass artist Karl de Bouché at his Munich studio. The windows were donated by the Prince Regent of Bavaria, with the first four installed in 1891 and the remainder in 1894.

The selection of figures for the windows reflect the Bavarian ties to the Greek monarchy. The windows on the right aisle feature depictions of Saint Amalia, Pope Sixtus II, Pope Telesphorus, and Athanasius of Alexandria. The left aisle is adorned with windows representing Otto of Bamberg, Pope Anterus, Pope Anacletus, and John Chrysostom, the Patriarch of Constantinople.

=== Choir loft and pipe organ ===
The wooden choir loft above the main entrance, which houses the cathedral's pipe organ, was constructed in 1888 by the architect Paul Chambaut (Greek: Παύλος Σαμπό) and decorated by F. Abadie. The current pipe organ was donated by the Franciscan monks of Rhodes and was manufactured by the renowned Italian organ-building firm Mascioni, based in Varese, Northern Italy. It replaced the cathedral's original organ, which had been built in 1888 by Zeno Fedeli as a gift from Pope Leo XIII. In 1951, Bishop Georgios Xenopoulos arranged for that original 1888 organ to be transferred to St. George's Cathedral, Ano Syros, where it remains today as Greece's oldest fully functional pipe organ.

Right and left of the choir loft and main entrance are two inscriptions, one in Latin, the other in Modern Greek, commemorating the Athenian visit of Pope John Paul II in 2001.

=== Doors ===
The main entrance to the basilica is secured by three massive exterior doors, which were drafted by Leo von Klenze. The doors were forged from solid iron in Lyon, France. The heavy iron doors were completed and transported to Athens in 1864.

== Feast day ==
The patronal feast day of the Cathedral Basilica of St. Dionysius the Areopagite is celebrated annually on 3 October, coinciding with the liturgical memorial of Saint Dionysius the Areopagite, who was the first Bishop of Athens. The observance holds special significance for the local Catholic community, as Saint Dionysius is venerated not only as the basilica's dedicatee but also as the patron saint and protector of the city of Athens.

== Gallery ==
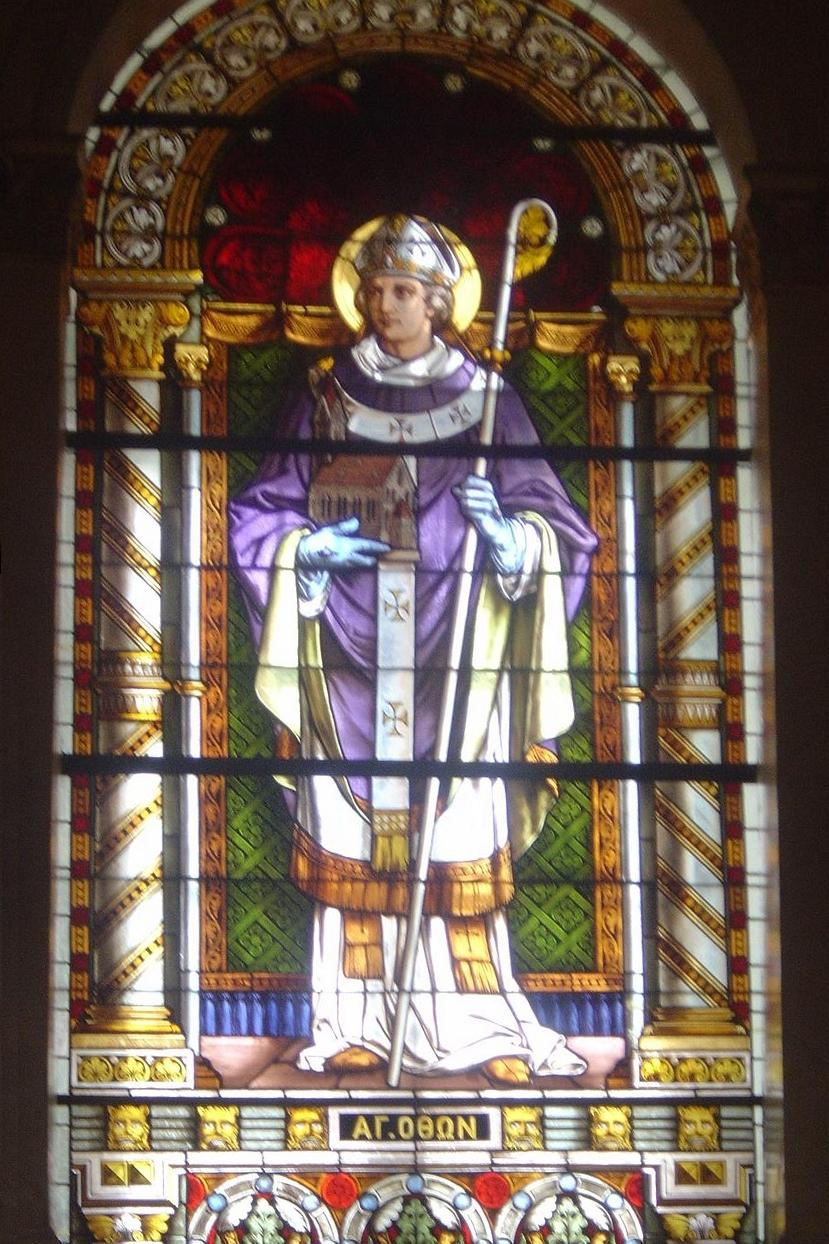
Stained glass depiction of Otto of Bamberg

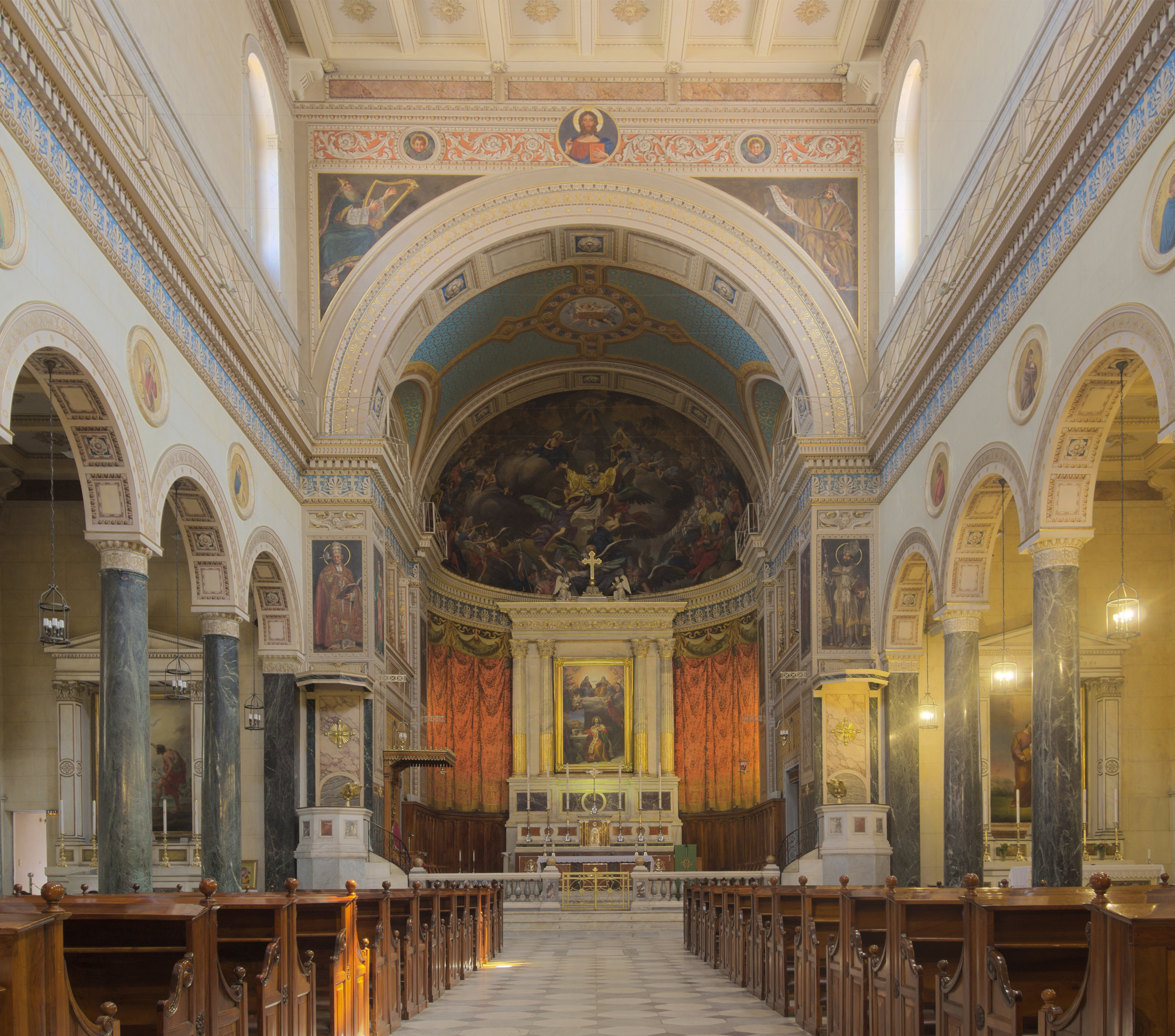
The interior of the church from the back of the nave

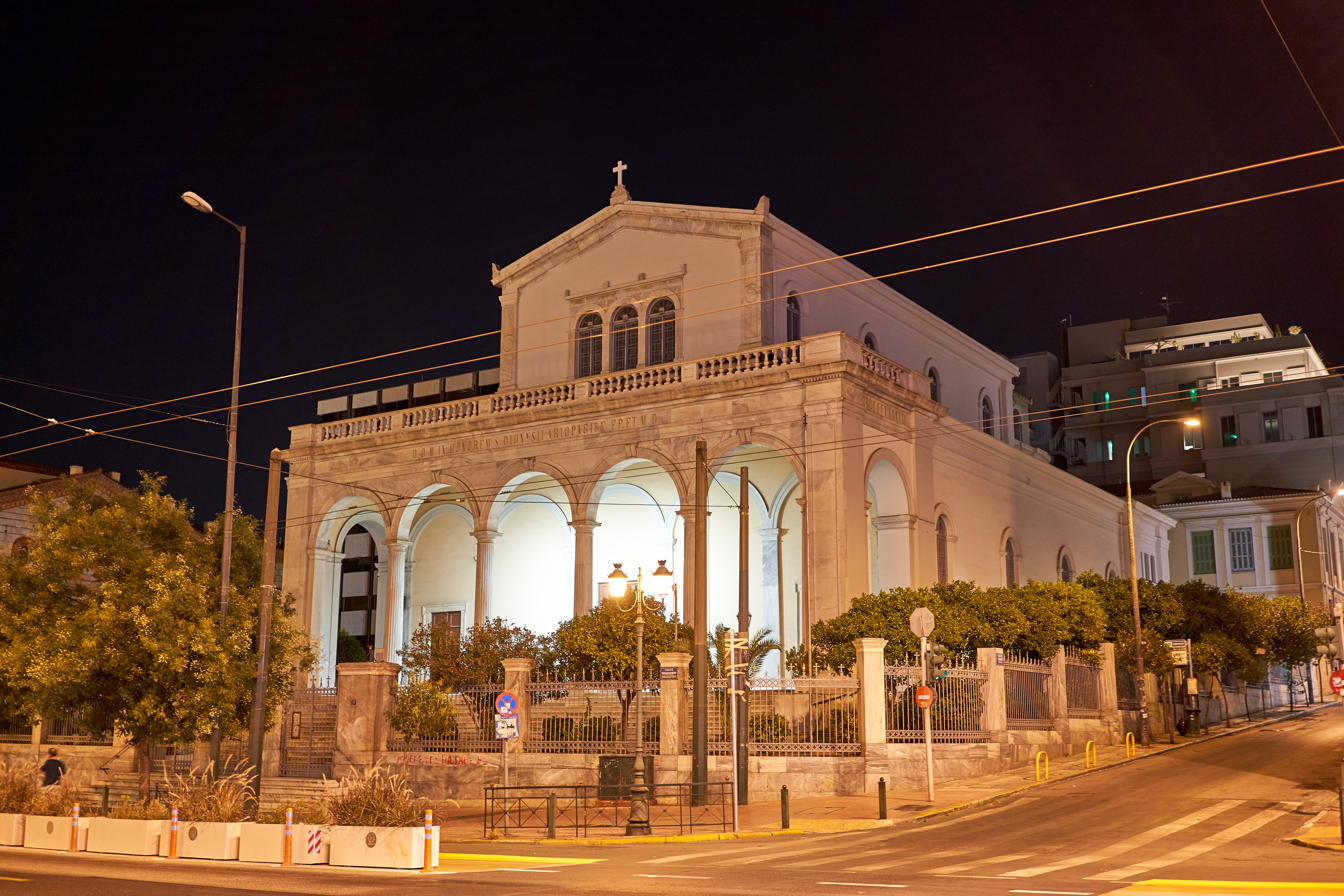
View at night from Panepistimiou Ave.

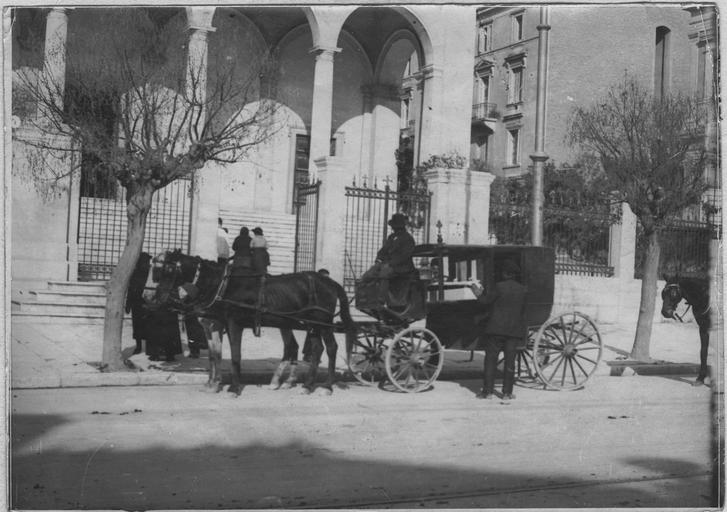
Front of the Cathedral in June 1917

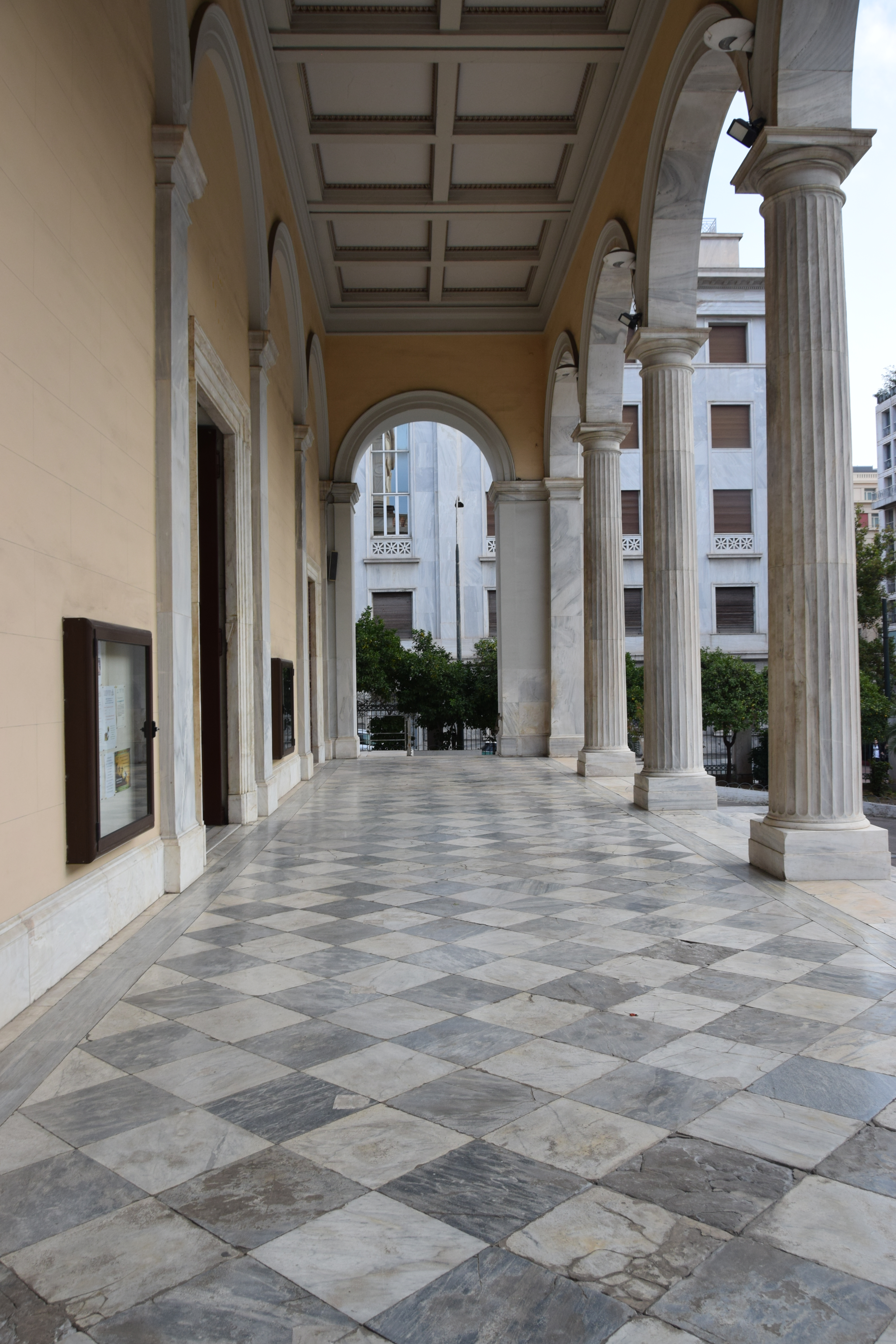
View from the exonarthex

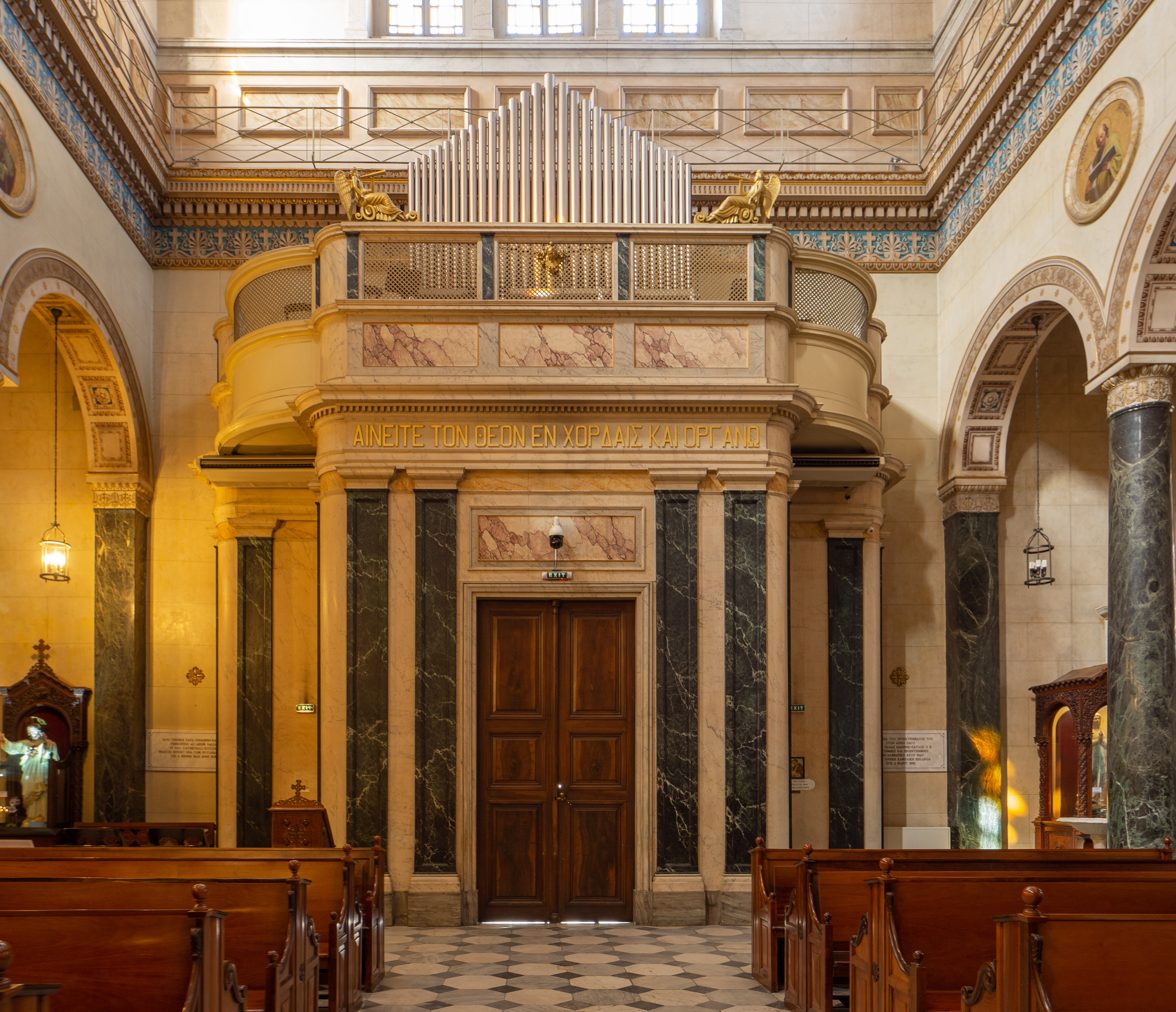
View of the narthex, the choir loft, and pipe organ

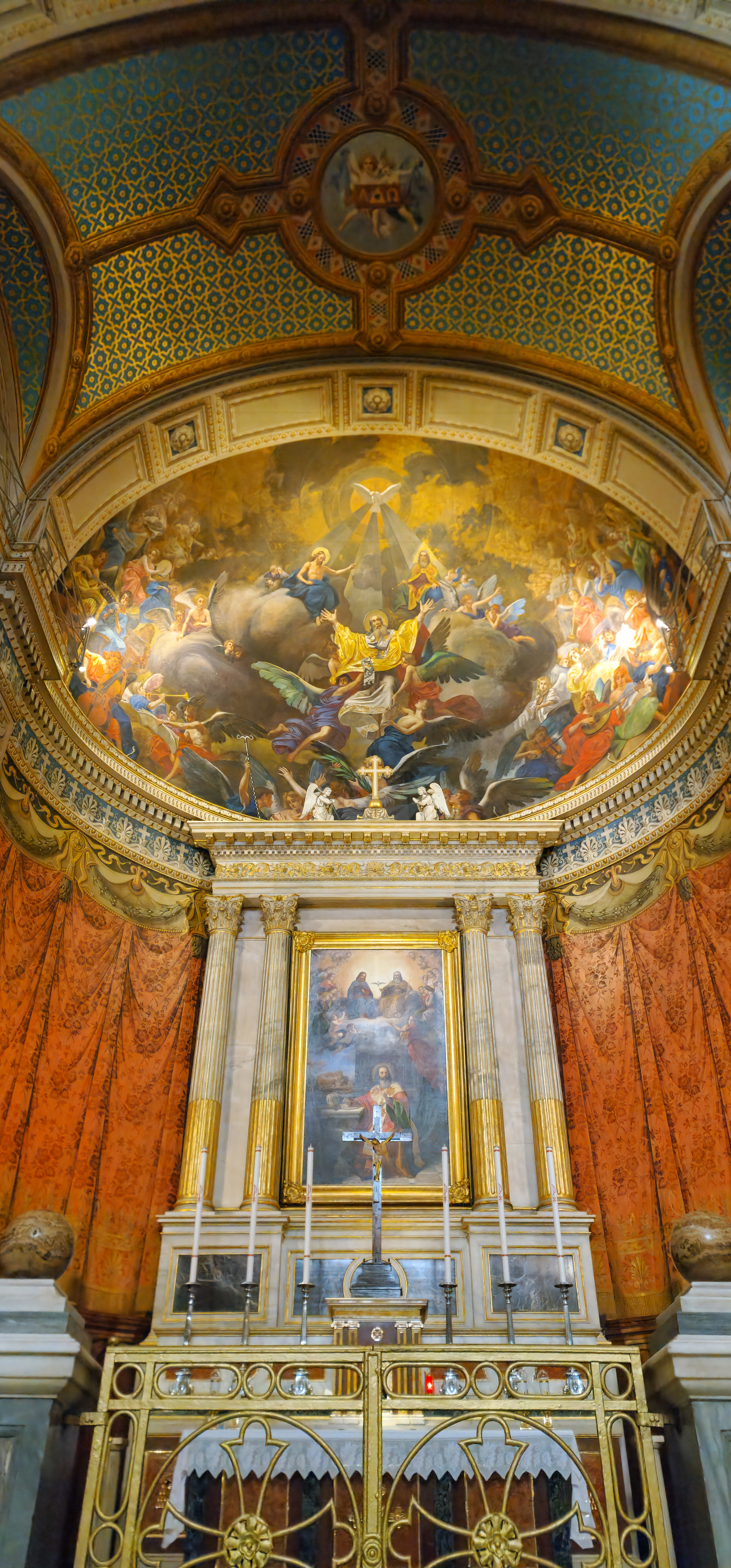
View of the apse, altar, and semi-dome

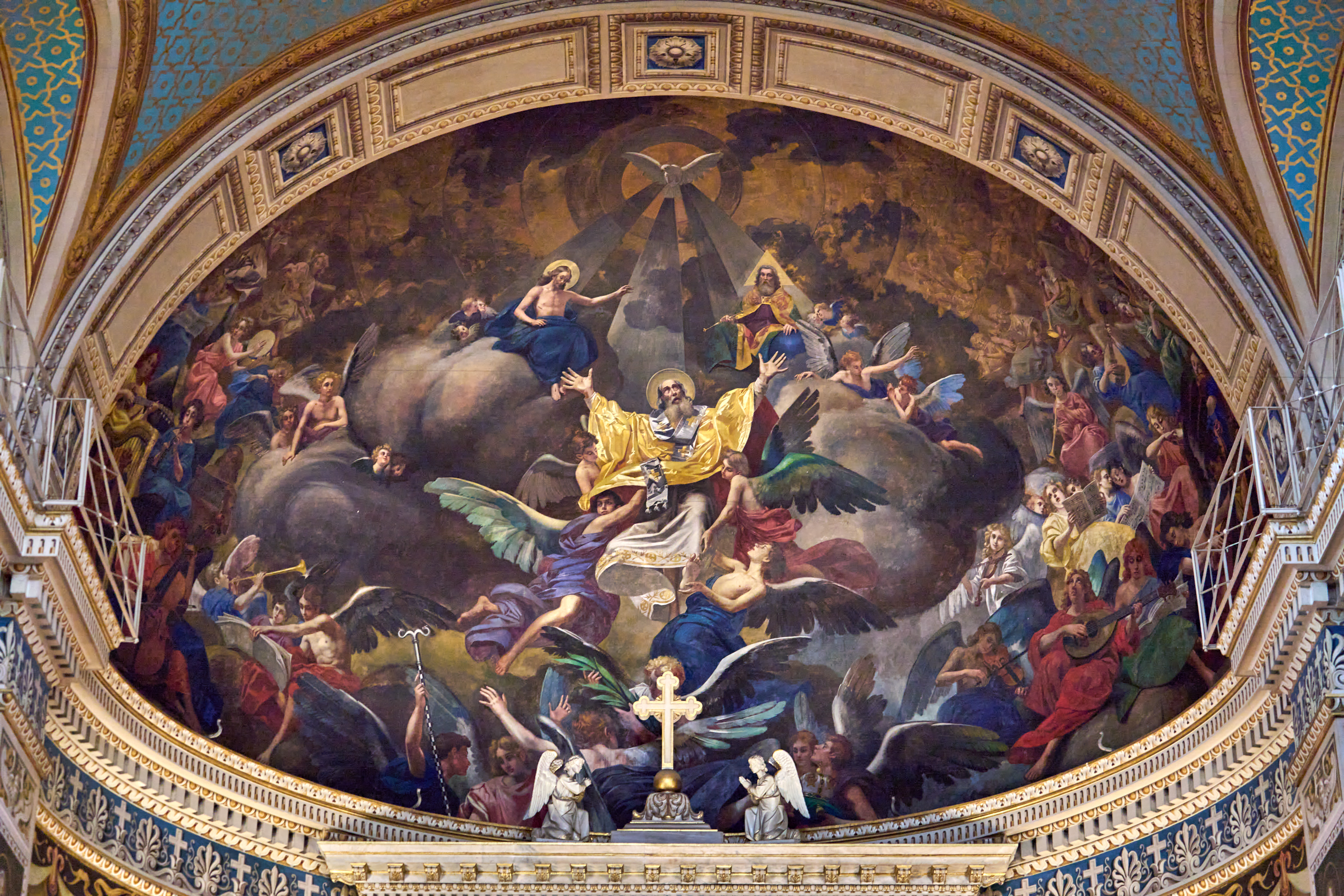
Fresco depicting the Apotheosis of Saint Dionysius

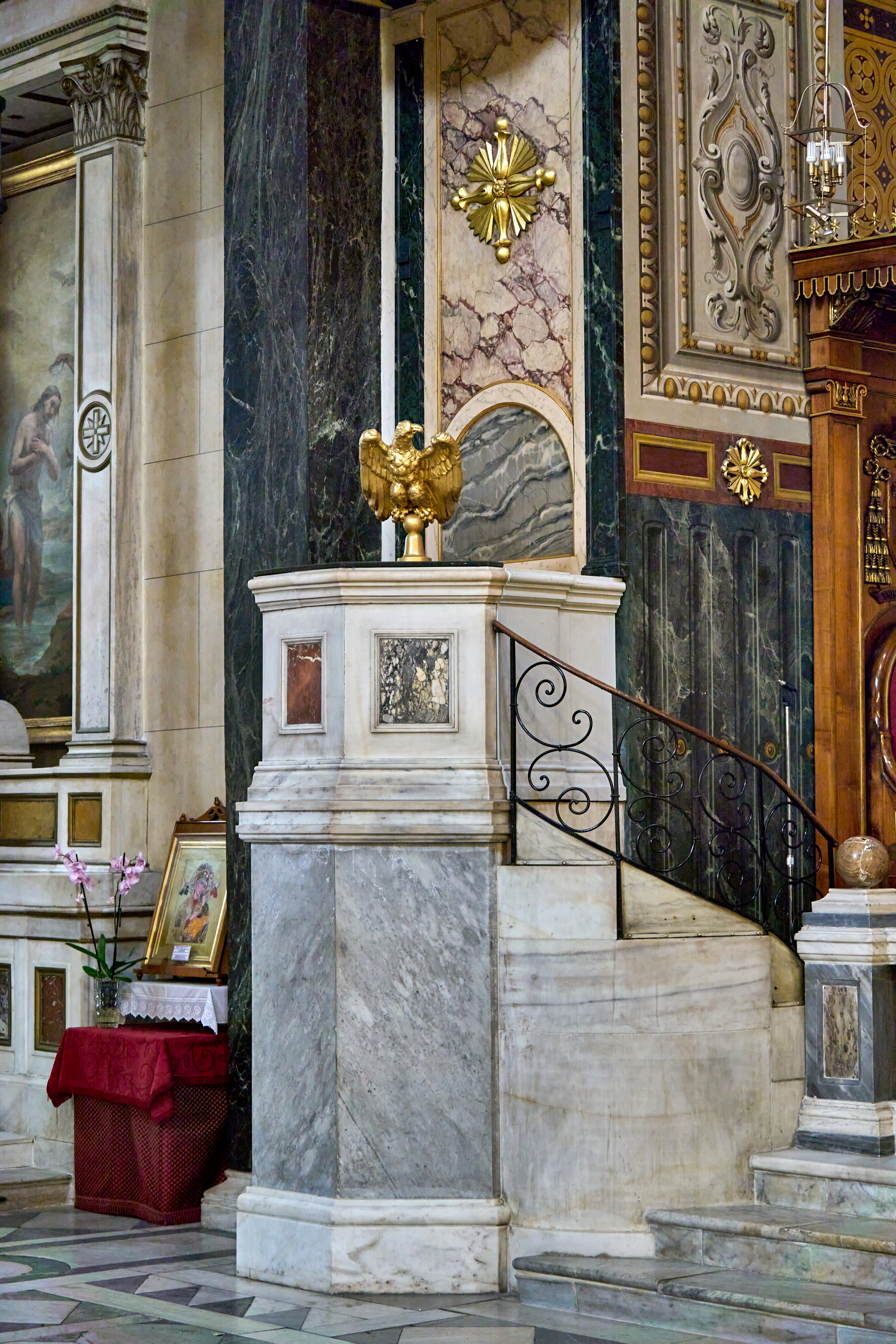
One of the 2 marble pulpits donated by Franz Joseph I of Austria

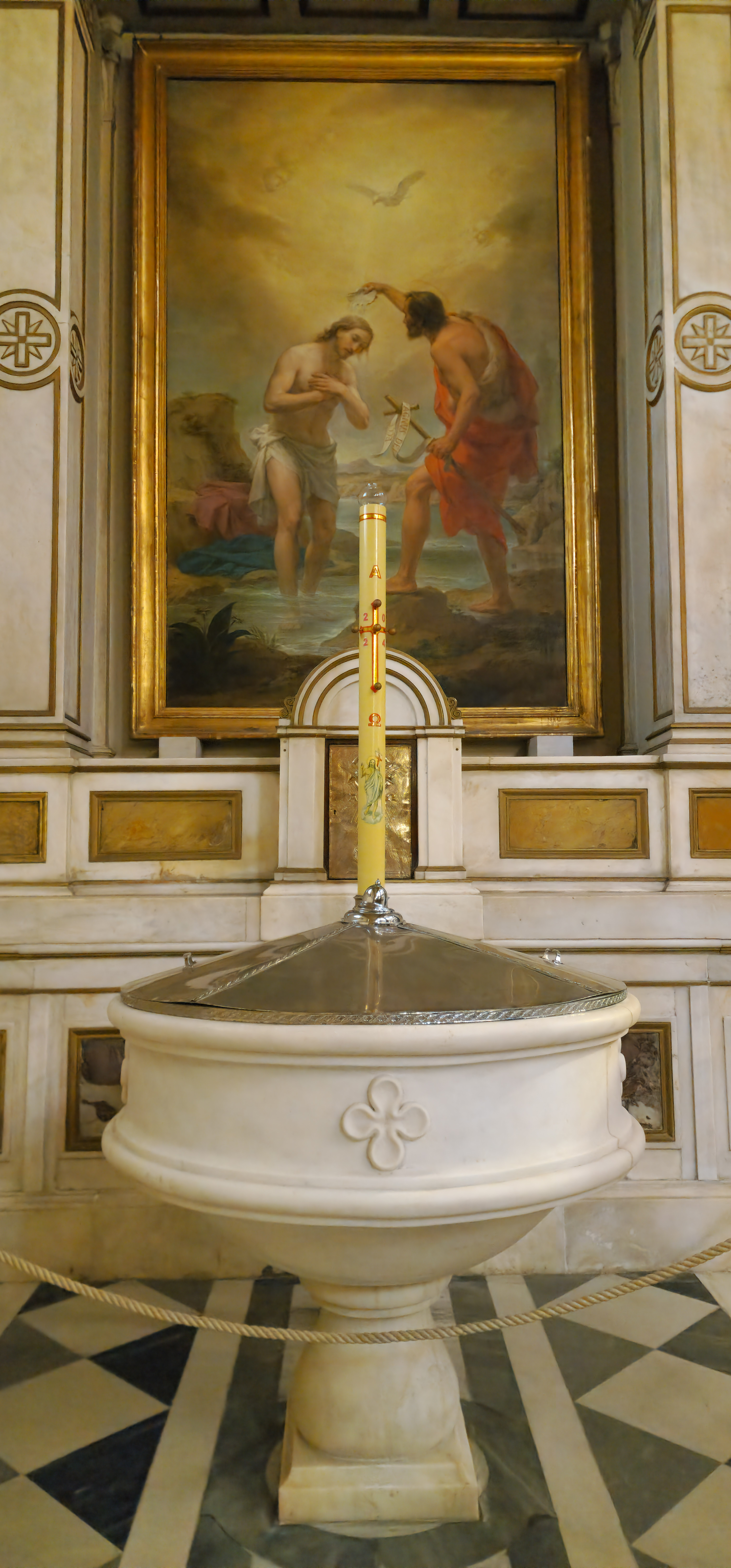
Baptistery with its marble baptismal font
