= Antonio Ballester =

Antonio Ballester (died 1387) was the Latin Archbishop of Athens from 27 March 1370, when he was appointed by Pope Urban VI, to his death. He was a Catalan, a Franciscan and a bachelor of theology. He is the only well-known archbishop of Athens from the 14th century. During his stay in Athens, he lived in an annex of the Erechtheum.

Ballester was elected to his archbishopric with the support of the Republic of Venice and had influence also in Italy. Ballester supported Peter IV of Aragon against Maria of Sicily in 1381. He also supported the Crown of Aragon over the Navarrese Company. In November 1379 Sibilia, the queen of Peter IV, tried to procure relics of the Virgin that were kept at Athens from Ballester. Since they were absent from the Parthenon in 1395, it seems likely that she succeeded.

On his death, John I of Aragon requested Antipope Clement VII to appoint one Antonio de Blasis to the vacant see. While some modern historians have doubted that Ballester was in fact dead when John requested the appointment of de Blasis, it has now been proven that he was. It was sometimes held that Ballester had in fact been captured by Nerio I Acciajuoli and later crowned Martin of Aragon in 1399, but this is false and arose from a confusion of the two Antonios.

== Sources ==
- Setton, Kenneth M. Catalan Domination of Athens 1311–1380. Revised edition. London: Variorum, 1975.
