= Georgios Altouvas =

Greek Roman Catholic archbishop (born 1973)

- Archbishop of Syros and Milos
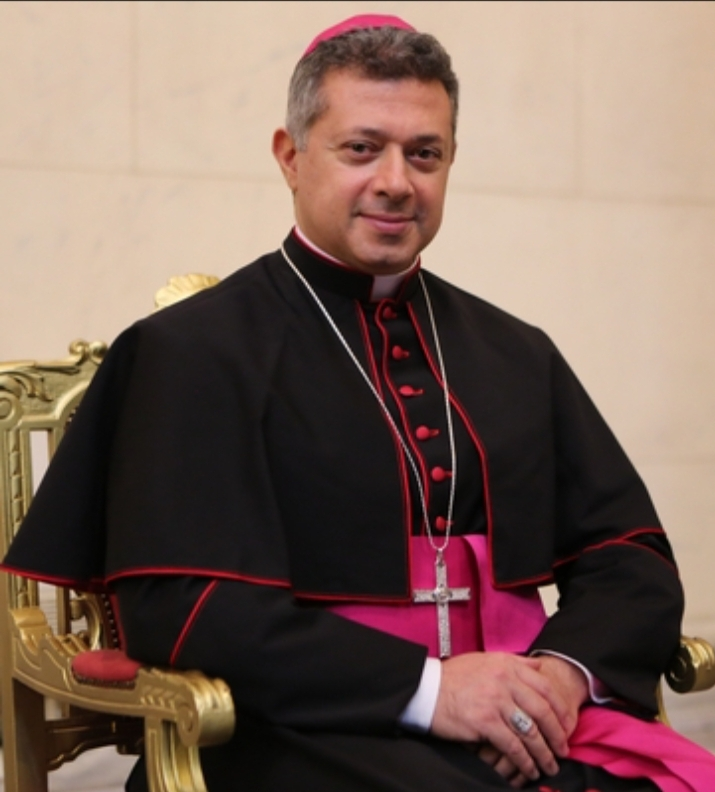
- Church: Catholic Church
- Archdiocese: Syros and Milos
- Appointed: 28 August 2026
- Installed: 31 October 2026
- Predecessor: Petros Stefanou
- Other post: Apostolic Administrator of Candia

Orders
- Ordination: 3 October 1998 by Nikolaos Foskolos
- Consecration: 7 February 2021 by Sevastianos Rossolatos

Personal details
- Born: Georgios Altouvas; 28 September 1973 (age 53) Athens, Greece
- Education: Pontifical Teresianum Institute
- Motto: Omnia amando donantur
- Coat of arms: Georgios Altouvas's coat of arms

Georgios Altouvas (Greek: Γεώργιος Αλτουβάς; born 28 September 1973) is a Greek Roman Catholic prelate who serves as the Archbishop-Bishop of Syros and Milos and Apostolic Administrator of Candia. He was appointed to these positions by Pope Leo XIV on 28 August 2026, having previously served as Archbishop of Corfu, Zakynthos and Kefalonia and Apostolic Administrator of the Apostolic Vicariate of Thessaloniki. He retains the personal title of archbishop.

== Early life and education ==
Altouvas was born in Athens, Greece, on 28 September 1973. He attended primary and secondary school in the Patissia district of Athens, studying at schools run by the Marist Brothers.

From 1992 to 1997, he studied philosophy and theology at the Theological Faculty of Apulia in Italy, residing at the Pontifical Regional Seminary Pius XI in Molfetta. On 5 October 1997, he was ordained a deacon in his home parish. He received his priestly ordination on 3 October 1998 at the Cathedral of Saint Dionysius the Areopagite in Athens, from Archbishop Nikolaos Foskolos of Athens.

In 1999, he obtained a licentiate in spiritual theology from the Pontifical Teresianum Institute in Rome.

== Priesthood ==
After completing his studies in Italy, Altouvas returned to Greece in 1999 and began serving as an assistant parish priest at the Cathedral of Saint Dionysius in Athens. In 2001, he was appointed parish priest of the parishes of Saint Barbara and the Holy Apostles, where he also served for three years as an ecclesiastical assistant responsible for youth ministry.

In 2015, he became parish priest of the Cathedral of Saint Dionysius in Athens. He also served as a member of the College of Consultors, a judge of the ecclesiastical tribunal of Athens, and national director of the Pontifical Mission Societies.

Altouvas speaks Greek, Italian, English and French.

== Episcopal ministry ==
=== Archbishop of Corfu ===
On 14 September 2020, Pope Francis appointed Altouvas Archbishop of Corfu, Zakynthos and Kefalonia, succeeding Yannis Spiteris. He was also appointed Apostolic Administrator of the Apostolic Vicariate of Thessaloniki. At the time of his appointment, he was serving as parish priest of the Cathedral of Saint Dionysius in Athens.

His episcopal ordination, originally scheduled for 14 November 2020 at the Cathedral of Saint Dionysius in Athens, and his installation in Corfu, scheduled for 22 November 2020, were postponed because of restrictions imposed during the COVID-19 pandemic. The Archdiocese of Corfu announced the postponement on 11 November 2020, following government measures suspending public religious ceremonies.

Altouvas was consecrated a bishop on 7 February 2021 at the Cathedral of Saint Dionysius in Athens, with Archbishop Sevastianos Rossolatos serving as the principal consecrator. He was installed as Archbishop of Corfu, Zakynthos and Kefalonia on 14 February 2021. He subsequently assumed his responsibilities as Apostolic Administrator of Thessaloniki, being installed in that capacity on 13 June 2021.

=== Archbishop of Syros and Milos ===
On 28 August 2026, Pope Leo XIV appointed Altouvas Bishop of Syros and Milos and Apostolic Administrator ad nutum Sanctae Sedis of Candia, transferring him from the Archdiocese of Corfu, Zakynthos and Kefalonia and the Apostolic Vicariate of Thessaloniki. The appointment retained his personal title of archbishop.

He was installed as Bishop of Syros and Milos on 31 October 2026. He retains the personal title of Archbishop of Santorini and serving as Apostolic Administrator of Crete (Candia). Also Altouvas continued to serve as Apostolic Administrator of Corfu, Zakynthos and Kefalonia and of the Apostolic Vicariate of Thessaloniki pending the appointment of successors.
