= Marios Makrionitis =

Greek Jesuit prelate (1913–1959)

The Most Reverend Marios Makrionitis SJ
- Archbishop of Athens
- Native name: Μάριος Μακρυωνίτης
- Church: Roman Catholic Church
- Archdiocese: Athens
- Appointed: 11 March 1953 by Pope Pius XII
- Term ended: 8 April 1959
- Predecessor: Markos Sigalas
- Successor: Venediktos Printesis
- Other post: Apostolic Vicar of Thessaloniki

Orders
- Ordination: 15 July 1941
- Consecration: 10 May 1953 by Georges Xenopulos, SJ

Personal details
- Born: Μάριος Μακρυωνίτης; 8 October 1913 Vari, Greece
- Died: 8 April 1959 (aged 45) Athens, Greece

Marios Makrionitis, SJ (Greek: Μάριος Μακρυωνίτης; 8 October 1913 – 8 April 1959) was a Greek Jesuit prelate of the Catholic Church. He served as the Archbishop of Athens from 1953 until 1959, when he died from injuries caused by an automobile accident.

== Biography ==
Makrionitis was born on 8 October 1913 in Vari, a small village in the island of Syros. He joined the Society of Jesus and was ordained to the priesthood on 15 July 1941. In 1952, he was appointed Apostolic Vicar of Thessaloniki.

Makrionitis was appointed Archbishop of Athens by Pope Pius XII on 11 March 1953. His episcopal consecration took place on 10 May 1953, with the Bishop of Santorini, Georges Xenopulos, serving as principal consecrator, and Archbishop Giovanni Francesco Filippucci and Bishop George Calavassy as co-consecrators. As archbishop, he held a Catholic Book Exhibition at the Athens Catholic Club, the first such event in Greek history.

On 8 April 1959, Makrionitis was severely injured in an automobile accident, and died later that day or in the early morning of April 9. He was succeeded as archbishop by Venediktos Printesis, a former parish priest.

== Episcopal lineage ==
- Cardinal Scipione Rebiba
- Cardinal Giulio Antonio Santorio (1566)
- Cardinal Girolamo Bernerio, OP (1586)
- Archbishop Galeazzo Sanvitale (1604)
- Cardinal Ludovico Ludovisi (1621)
- Cardinal Luigi Caetani (1622)
- Cardinal Ulderico Carpegna (1630)
- Cardinal Paluzzo Paluzzi Altieri degli Albertoni (1666)
- Pope Benedict XIII (1675)
- Pope Benedict XIV (1724)
- Pope Clement XIII (1743)
- Cardinal Marco Antonio Colonna (1762)
- Cardinal Hyacinthe Sigismond Gerdil, CRSP (1777)
- Cardinal Giulio Maria della Somaglia (1788)
- Cardinal Carlo Odescalchi, SJ (1823)
- Bishop Eugène de Mazenod, OMI (1832)
- Archbishop Joseph-Hippolyte Guibert, OMI (1842)
- Cardinal François-Marie-Benjamin Richard (1872)
- Cardinal Pietro Gasparri (1898)
- Archbishop Angelo Rotta (1922)
- Archbishop Giovanni Francesco Filippucci (1927)
- Bishop Georges Xenopulos, SJ (1947)
- Archbishop Marios Makrionitis, SJ (1953)
