= Assumption Cathedral, Chania =

Cathedral in Chania, Crete, Greece

Assumption Cathedral
- Cathedral of the Assumption of the Virgin Mary
- Catholic Cathedral of Chania
- Καθεδρικός Ναός της Κοιμήσεως της Θεοτόκου
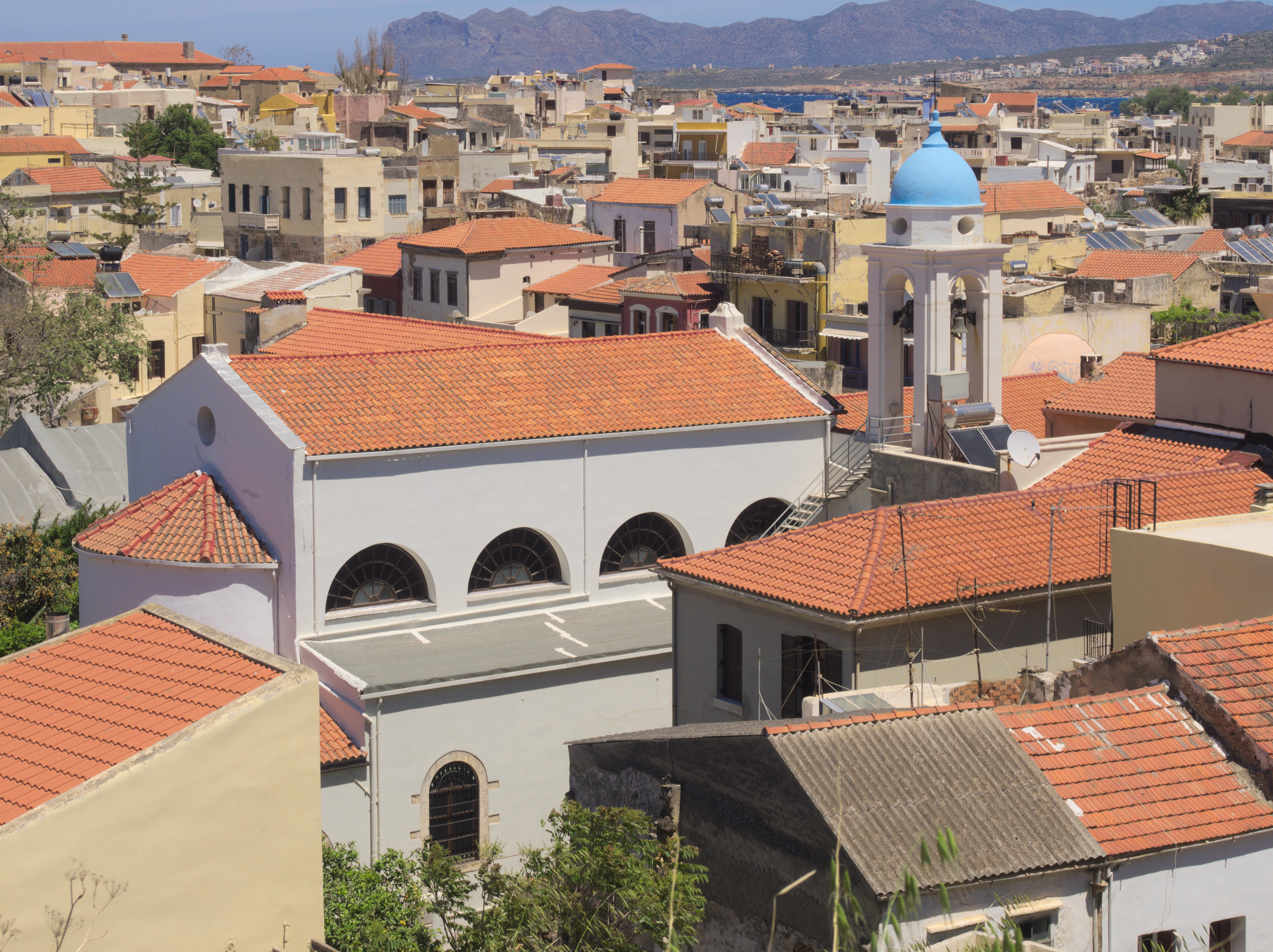

- Location of the cathedral in Crete
- Assumption Cathedral
- 35°30′55″N 24°01′01″E
- Location: Chania
- Country: Greece
- Denomination: Roman Catholic Church
- Religious order: Capuchin Franciscans
- Churchmanship: Latin rite

History
- Status: Cathedral
- Dedication: Assumption of the Virgin Mary

Architecture
- Functional status: Active
- Architectural type: Basilica
- Completed: 1879

Administration
- Archdiocese: Naxos, Andros, Tinos and Mykonos
- Diocese: Crete (RC)

Clergy
- Bishop: sede vacante

The Assumption Cathedral, also called the Catholic Cathedral of Chania and officially the Cathedral of the Assumption of the Virgin Mary (Greek: Καθεδρικός Ναός της Κοιμήσεως της Θεοτόκου), is the Roman Catholic cathedral in Chania, on the island of Crete in Greece.

== History ==
It was built in 1879 by the first Catholic bishop of Crete, Aloisio Cannavo, to serve the entire Catholic population of the region. In 2004, the cathedral celebrated its 125th anniversary. The church is under the responsibility of the Capuchin Order.

The cathedral follows the Roman or Latin rite and is the seat of the Roman Catholic Diocese of Crete (Dioecesis Candiensis or Επισκοπή Κρήτης) that was originally created in 1213 and was restored by Pope Pius IX in 1874. The bishop of the diocese is sede vacante.

== See also ==
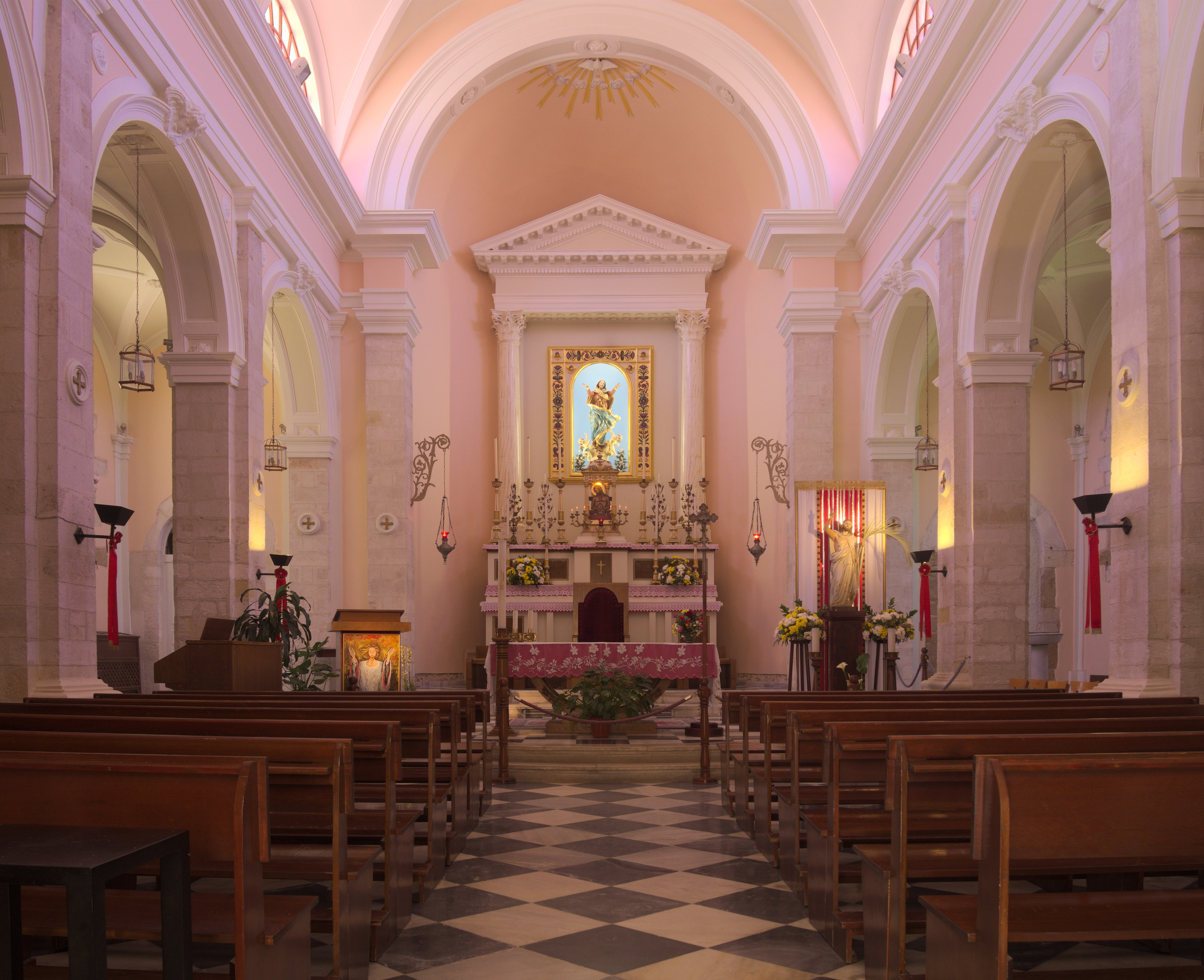
Interior view

- Roman Catholicism in Greece
- List of Roman Catholic cathedrals in Greece
