= Diocese of Crete =

Roman Catholic diocese in Greece

Coordinates: 35.5155°N 24.0176°E

Diocese of Crete Dioecesis Candiensis Επισκοπή Κρήτης

Catholic
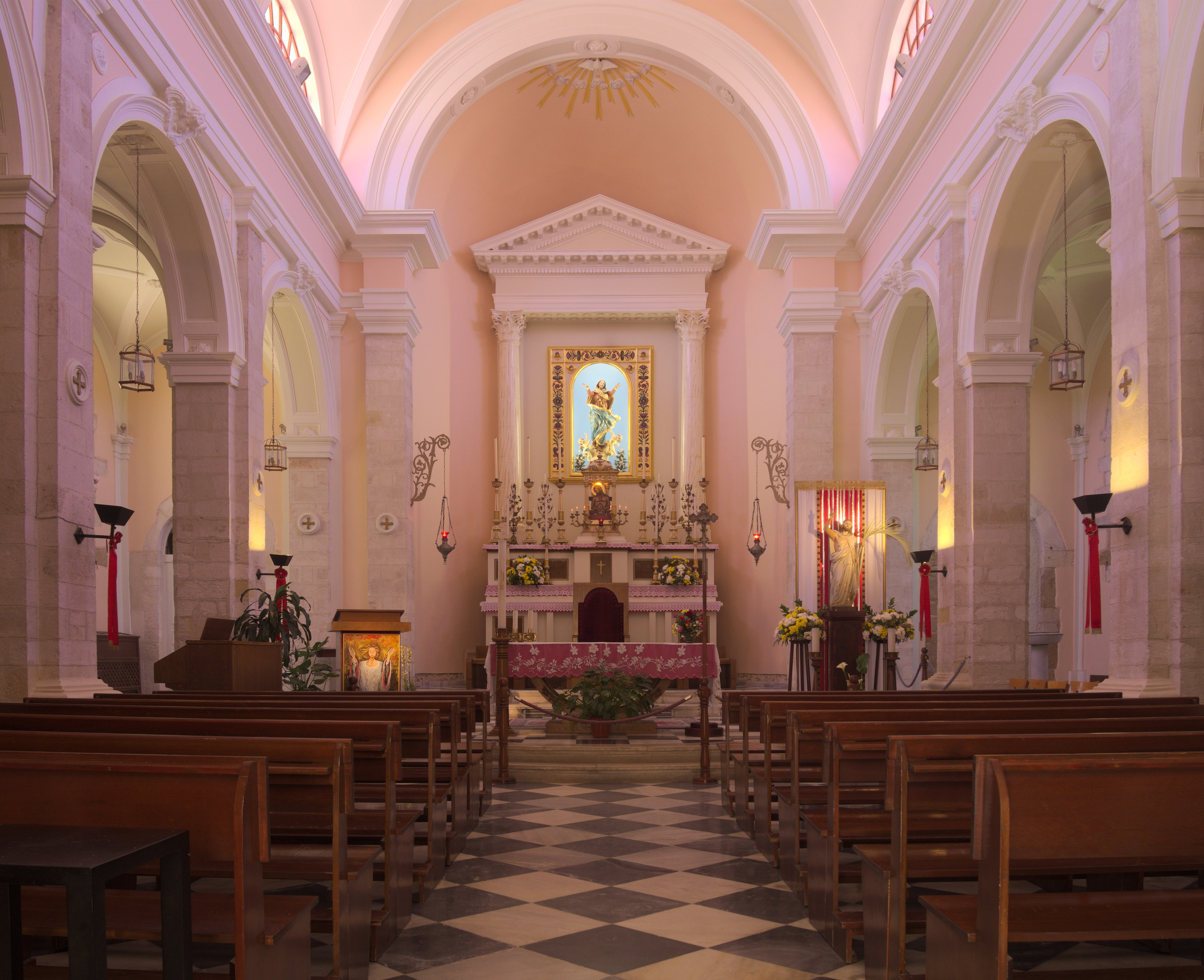
- Interior of Assumption Cathedral

Location
- Country: Greece
- Metropolitan: Archdiocese of Naxos, Andros, Tinos and Mykonos
- Headquarters: Heraklion, Crete, Greece

Statistics
- Area: 8,393 km^{2} (3,241 sq mi)
- Population: Total; Catholics: (as of 2023); 509,000; 4,200 (0.8%)
- Parishes: 3

Information
- Denomination: Catholic Church
- Sui iuris church: Latin Church
- Rite: Roman Rite
- Established: 1213 (As Archdiocese of Candia); 28 August 1874 (As Diocese of Crete)
- Cathedral: Cathedral of the Assumption, Chania

Current leadership
- Pope: Leo XIV
- Bishop: Sede vacante
- Metropolitan Archbishop: Josif Printesis
- Apostolic Administrator: Georgios Altouvas; Sevastianos Rossolatos

The Diocese of Crete (Latin: Dioecesis Candiensis) is a Latin Church diocese of the Catholic Church located on the island of Crete in the ecclesiastical province of Naxos, Andros, Tinos and Mykonos in Greece.

== History ==
Roman Catholic presence on the island of Crete dates to its conquest by the Republic of Venice in the years after the Fourth Crusade (1204), and its establishment as a Venetian colony in 1212. Immediately after that, the first Latin Rite Archbishop of Crete was appointed, with a succession of holders until the Ottoman conquest of the island in the Cretan War (1645–1669). Thereafter the see remained vacant, until re-established as a simple bishopric on 28 August 1874, initially a suffragan of the Roman Catholic Archdiocese of İzmir, but today a suffragan of the Roman Catholic Archdiocese of Naxos, Andros, Tinos and Mykonos.

Present day Catholic Churches in Heraklion (Saint John The Baptist), Chania, Rethymnon (St. Antony of Padua)

== Bishops ==
=== Venetian period ===
- anonymous (1213 – ?), took part in the Fifth Crusade in 1220
- Giovanni Querini (? – 17 July 1252, named Bishop of Ferrara with the personal rank of archbishop)
- Angelo Maltraverso, OP (1252 – 28 May 1255, named Patriarch of Grado)
- Leonardo Pantaleo (1260 – 1268)
- anonymous (mentioned 10 May 1282)
- Matteo, OP (31 January 1289 – ?)
- Angelo Beacqua (7 April 1294 – ?, deceased)
  - See united with the Latin Patriarchate of Constantinople (1302–1314)
- Alessandro di Sant'Elpidio, OESA (2 March 1314 – 1334, dismissed)
- Egidio di Gallutiis, OP (11 May 1334 – 6 December 1340, deceased)
- Francesco Michiel (before 25 September 1342 – ?, named Bishop of Patara with the personal rank of archbishop)
- Orso Dolfin (30 March 1349 – 5 November 1361, named patriarch of Grado)
  - Orso Dolfin (5 November 1361 – 1363), apostolic administrator
- Pietro Tommaso, OCarm (6 March 1363 – 5 July 1364, named patriarch of Constantinople)
- Francesco Querini (5 July 1364 – 22 December 1367, named patriarch of Grado)
- Antonio Negri (15 January 1369 – ?)
- Pietro (April 1375 – ?)
- Matteo (19 March 1378 – ?)
- Cristoforo Gallina ?
- Antonio Contarini (6 April 1386 – 16 March 1387, deceased)
- Leonardo Dolfin (7 May 1387 – 29 April 1392, named Bishop of Castello with the personal rank of archbishop)
- Marco Giustiniani (31 August 1392 – 1405, deceased)
- Francesco Pavoni (13 February 1406 – 1407?, deceased)
- Marco Marin (18 October 1407 – ?, deceased)
- Leonardo Dolfin (14 September 1408 – 1415, deceased)
- Pietro Donà (18 April 1415 – 1425, named Bishop of Castello with the personal rank of archbishop)
- Fantino Valaresso (5 December 1425 – 18 May 1443, deceased)
- Fantino Dandolo (4 September 1444 – 8 January 1448, named bishop of Padua with the personal rank of archbishop)
- Filippo Paruta (arcivescovo)|Filippo Paruta (20 February 1448 – 1458, deceased)
- Gerolamo Lando (29 March 1458 – 1493/1494, dismissed)
- Andrea Lando (4 July 1494 – 1505, deceased)
- Giovanni Lando (2 March 1506 – 1534 ?)
  - Lorenzo Campeggio (17 June 1534 – 1535), apostolic administrator
- Pietro Lando (28 January 1536 – 1575, dismissed)
- Lorenzo Vitturi (6 February 1576 – 5 February 1597, deceased)
- Tommaso Contarini (4 July 1597 – 7 February 1604, deceased)
- Aloisio Grimani (7 January 1605 – 21 February 1620, deceased)
- Pietro Valier (18 May 1620 – 2 October 1623, named Bishop of Ceneda with the personal rank of archbishop)
- Luca Stella (4 December 1623 – 24 November 1632, named Bishop of Vicenza with the personal rank of archbishop)
- Leonardo Mocenigo (20 June 1633 – 1644, deceased)
- Giovanni Querini (19 November 1644 – ?, deceased)

See vacant from 1669.

=== Modern period ===
- Bishop Petros Stefanou, (Apostolic Administrator);
- Bishop Frangkiskos Papamanolis, OFMCap (Apostolic Administrator 1974.06.27 – 2014.05.13)
- Bishop Georges Xenopulos, SJ (Apostolic Administrator 1952 – 1974)
- Fr. Arsenio da Corfù, OFMCap (Apostolic Administrator 1951 – 1952)
- Fr. Amedeo Marcantonio Speciale da Gangi, OFMCap (Apostolic Administrator 1945? – 1951)
- Fr. Roberto da Gangi, OFMCap (Apostolic Administrator 1939 – 1945?)
- Bishop Lorenzo Giacomo Inglese, OFMCap (1934.02.01 – 1935.05.05)
- Fr. Isidoro da Smirne, OFMCap (Apostolic Administrator 1926 – 1933?)
- Bishop Francesco Giuseppe Seminara, OFMCap (1910.06.22 – 1926.03.15)
- Bishop Luigi Canavo, OFMCap (1874.12.22 – 1889.05.10)

== See also ==
- Roman Catholicism in Greece

== Sources ==
- GCatholic.org
- Catholic Hierarchy
- Diocese website
- Crete Parishes Website
