= Immaculate Conception Cathedral, Thessaloniki =

Roman Catholic cathedral in Thessaloniki, Central Macedonia, Greece

Immaculate Conception Cathedral
- Cathedral of the Immaculate Conception
- Καθεδρικός Ναός της Αμιάντου Συλλήψεως της Θεοτόκου
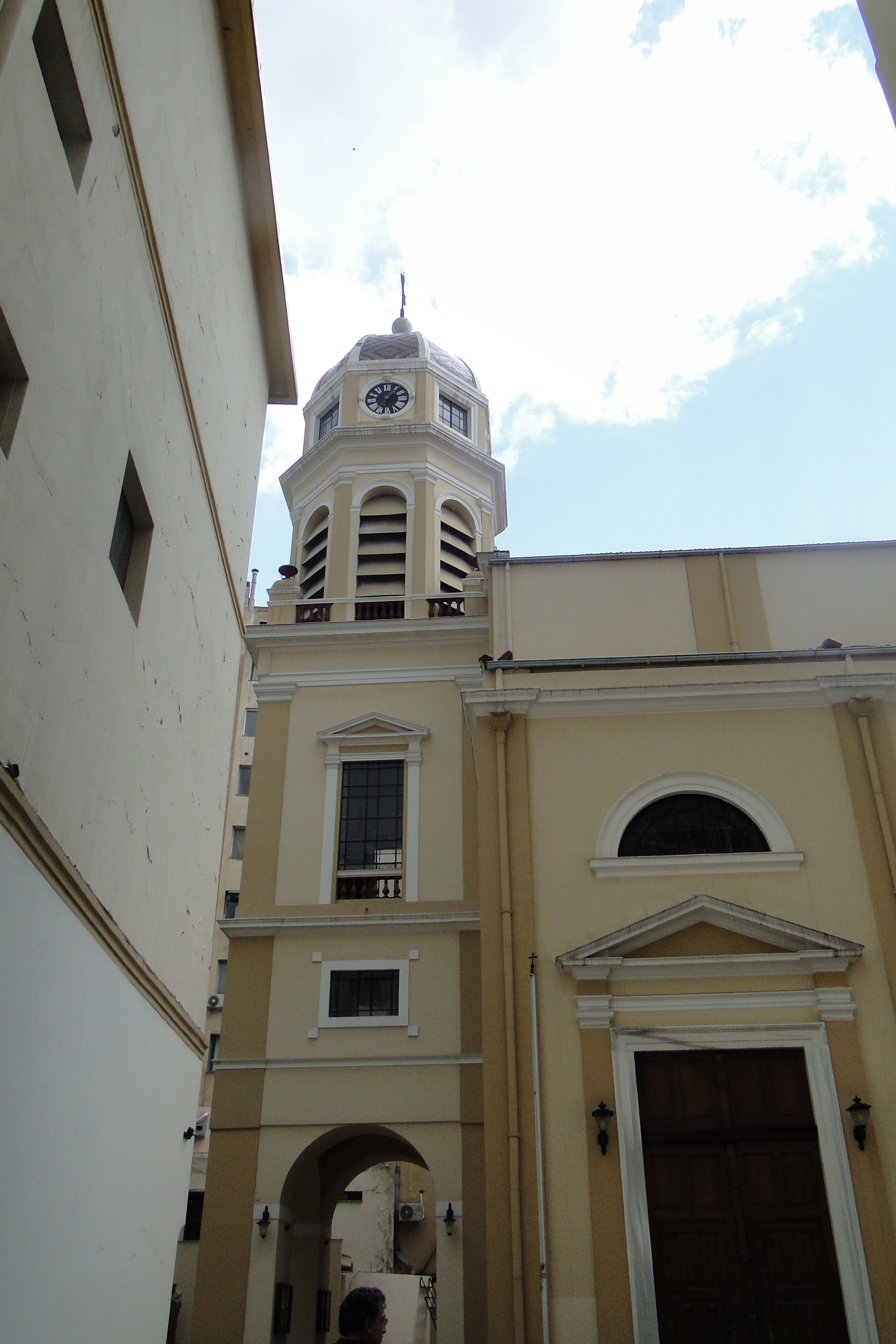
- The cathedral in 2010

- Location of the cathedral in Greece
- Immaculate Conception Cathedral
- 40°38′14″N 22°56′18″E
- Location: Thessaloniki, Central Macedonia
- Country: Greece
- Denomination: Roman Catholic
- Churchmanship: Latin Rite

History
- Status: Church (1743–1926); Cathedral (since 1926– )
- Dedication: Immaculate Conception
- Consecrated: 3 May 1900

Architecture
- Functional status: Active
- Architect: Vitaliano Poselli (1900)
- Architectural type: Basilica
- Style: Italianate
- Completed: 1743 (original structure); 1900 (current structure)
- Demolished: 1839 (fire)

Administration
- Diocese: Apostolic Vicariate of Thessaloniki

Clergy
- Bishop: sede vacante

The Immaculate Conception Cathedral, officially the Cathedral of the Immaculate Conception (Greek: Καθεδρικός Ναός της Αμιάντου Συλλήψεως της Θεοτόκου), is a Catholic cathedral located on Frangon street in the city of Thessaloniki, in Central Macedonia region of Greece. The church follows the Roman or Latin Rite and functions as the seat of the Apostolic Vicariate of Thessaloniki that, as of December 2025, was sede vacante.

== History ==
=== Foundation ===
In the 18th century, the Catholic community in Thessaloniki was served by the Jesuits. In 1713, the Jesuits built St. Louis Church next to the French consulate. On 30 March 1740, it became a parish. Two years later, a new larger church, also named St. Louis, was built. In 1773, with the suppression of the Society of Jesus, the Jesuits was banned from Greece and the Lazarists replaced them. In 1839, a fire destroyed a third of the city, including the church. The church was rebuilt within a year and dedicated to Mary, mother of Jesus and her Immaculate Conception.

=== Construction ===
On 7 October 1896, the foundation stone of the current church was laid. The church was designed by Vitaliano Poselli. The parish priest at the time was Fr Erique Heudre. Construction was financially aided by a French tobacco merchant, Frederick Charnaud. The crypt was completed and consecrated on 30 May 1897, it was dedicated to the Sacred Heart of Jesus and decorated by Michael Bucar, a Lazarist brother from Slovenia. On 3 May 1900 the church was consecrated by Archbishop Augustus Bonetti of Palmyra and Fr Francois Xavier Lobry, the Lazarist provincial in Turkey.

In 1926, the church became the seat of the Apostolic Vicariate of Thessaloniki; which is composed of the Roman Catholic communities in northern Greece.

=== Repair and renovation ===
Although the church survived the Great Thessaloniki Fire of 1917, it was heavily damaged during World War II. The roof, decoration furnishings and organ were all destroyed. After the war, repairs were carried out. The roof was rebuilt, the church was redecorated, and new furnishings, stained glass windows and an organ were installed.

In the early 1970s, the altar was moved and in 1981 the crypt was renovated. In 2000, the church building was repainted. In 2008, new lighting, heating and air-conditioning systems were installed.

== Parish ==
The Masses are celebrated in Greek and English. On Sundays at 08:00 and 10:00 masses are said in Greek with English at 19:00.

In the city there is also a Catholic cemetery in Ampelokipoi.

== See also ==
- Roman Catholicism in Greece
- List of Roman Catholic cathedrals in Greece
