= Ioannis Marangos =

Greek Roman Catholic archbishop

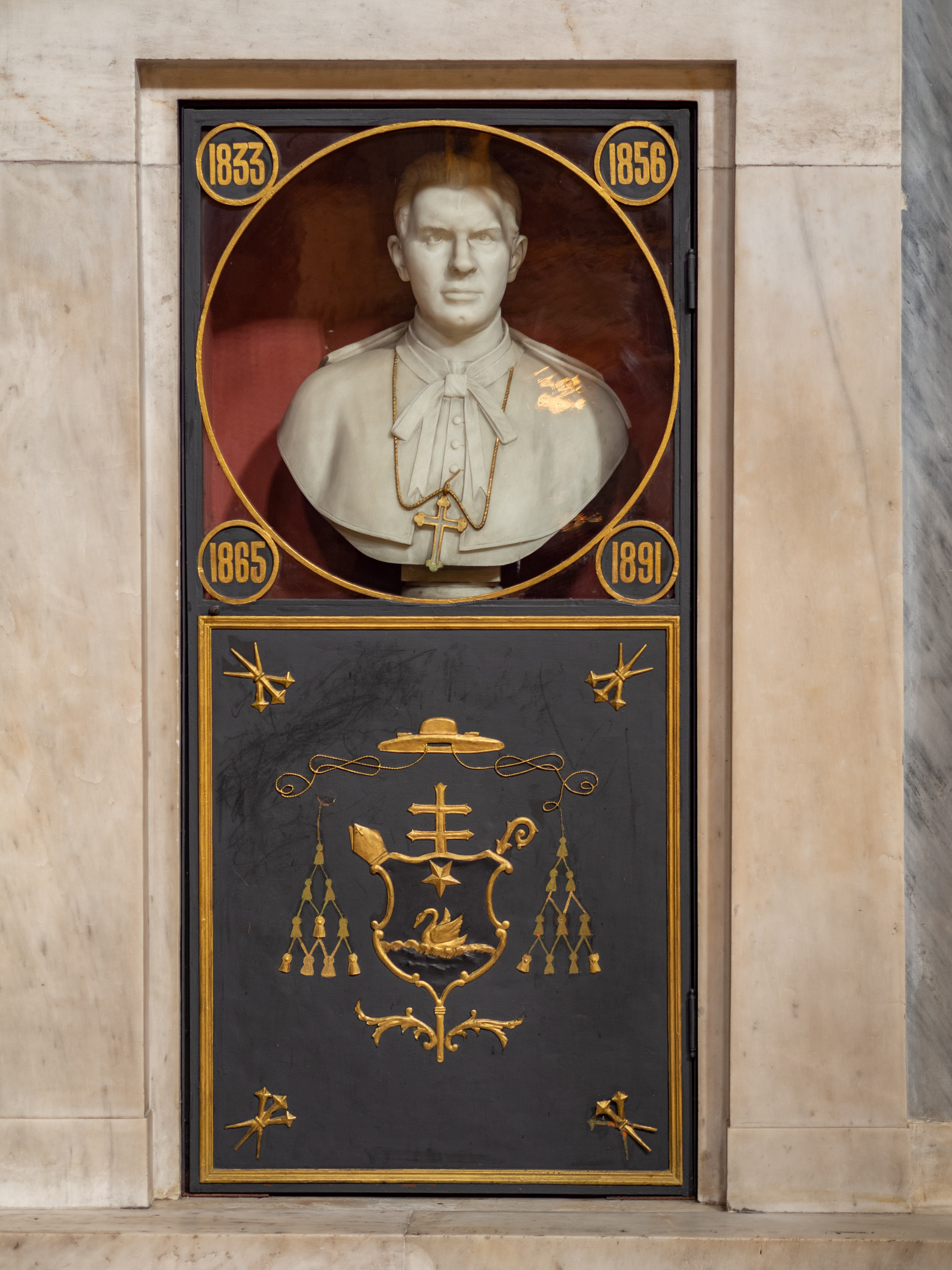
Bust of Ioannis Marangos in the Cathedral Basilica of St. Dionysius the Areopagite, Athens

Ioannis Marangos (Greek: Ιωάννης Μαραγκός; Italian: Giovanni Marango; 31 March 1833, Ano Syros – 17 December 1891, Smyrna), was a Roman Catholic archbishop of the Roman Catholic Archdiocese of Athens.

== Biography ==
After primary preliminary studies in Ano Syros and the School of the Franciscans in Naxos, Marangos, at the suggestion of the Roman Catholic Bishop of Syros Aloisiou Vlaga, he departed for Rome to prepare for the priestly vocation. In 1856 he was ordained a priest and returned to Syros. Due to a lack of priests he was called to Patras where he served the Catholic community in the Parish Church of Saint Andrew.

In 1856, at the age of 33, Marangos was elected assistant bishop of Tinos and Mykonos next to Bishop Francis Zaloni. With Zaloni's death in 1866, Pope Pius IX named him Bishop of Tinos-Mykonos. Besides the great efforts he raised the intellectual and cultural level of the congregation at that time, that numbered 6,000 faithful, made completions in the Cathedral of Our Lady of the Rosary of Xynaras, built a new Hall Episcopal Seminary and founded the church administration. Besides these facts, he organized the Archives of the Roman Catholic Archdiocese of Naxos, Andros, Tinos and Mykonos, which is among the East's richest archives. Marangos took part in the First Vatican Council, where, because of his high theological training, he was elected Rapporteur of the Commission on Dogma.

On 10 August 1874, King George I of Greece by royal decree recognized Marangos as being entrusted with the episcopal functions in those parts of the Kingdom in which no other Western Church Bishops had.

With the reestablishment of the Roman Catholic Archdiocese of Athens, Pius IX appointed him to it. Marangos helped to support those affected by the earthquakes of Cephalonia and Aigio, as well as helped those in need after the unfortunate Cretan Revolt against the Turks. For this reason he was honored by the Greek State to the distinction of Commander of the Royal Order of the Redeemer.

He died aged 58 in Smyrna where he had traveled to participate in the local session. The funeral sequence was in the Cathedral Basilica of St. Dionysius the Areopagite and was attended by the Prime Minister of Greece, ministers, the mayor and the crowd of Catholic and Orthodox faithful.

== Sources ==
- Gazette of the Kingdom of Greece, No. 52/1874, p. 1
- M. N. Roussos, Epifaneis Syrianoi, Athens, 1986, pp. 53–58
