= Nikolaos Foskolos =

Roman Catholic archbishop

The Most Reverend Nikolaos Foskolos
- Archbishop of Athens
- Church: Roman Catholic Church
- Archdiocese: Athens
- Appointed: 25 June 1973
- Installed: 25 June 1973
- Term ended: 12 August 2014
- Predecessor: Venediktos Printesis
- Successor: Sevastianos Rossolatos

Orders
- Ordination: 1 October 1961
- Consecration: 12 August 1973 by Ioannis Perris

Personal details
- Born: Nikolaos Foscolos; 11 December 1936 (age 89) Komi, Greece

Nikolaos Foskolos (Greek: Νικόλαος Φώσκολος, born 11 December 1936 in Komi, Tinos, Greece) was the Archbishop of Athens and Apostolic Administrator of the Roman Catholic Archdiocese of Rhodes.

== Biography ==
Foscolos was ordained priest on 1 October 1961. On 25 June 1973 he was appointed Archbishop of Athens and on 12 August 1973 he was ordained Archbishop by Ioannis Perris, Archbishop of Naxos, Andros, Tinos and Mykonos. From 1973 until his resignation on 12 August 2014 he was Roman Catholic Archbishop of Athens and Apostolic Administrator of the Roman Catholic Archdiocese of Rhodes, whom he was named in 1992. From 1992 to 2004 Foskolos was president of the Episcopal Conference of Greece. His successor in both offices is the Rev. Fr. Sevastianos Rossolatos.
