= Frangkiskos Papamanolis =

Greek Roman Catholic bishop (1936–2023)

His Excellency, The Most Reverend Frangkiskos Papamanolis O.F.M. Cap.
- Bishop of Syros e Milos; Bishop of Santorini; Apostolic Administrator of Crete
- Native name: Φραγκίσκος Παπαμανώλης
- Appointed: 27 June 1974
- Installed: 20 October 1974
- Term ended: 13 May 2014
- Predecessor: Georges Xenopulos
- Successor: Petros Stefanou

Orders
- Ordination: 29 April 1962
- Consecration: 20 October 1974 by Georges Xenopulos
- Rank: Bishop

Personal details
- Born: 5 December 1936 Ano Syros, Syros, Greece
- Died: 2 October 2023 (aged 86) Syros, Greece
- Denomination: Catholic Church

Frangkiskos Papamanolis, OFM Cap. (Greek: Φραγκίσκος Παπαμανώλης; 5 December 1936 – 2 October 2023) was a Catholic prelate in Greece who served as Bishop of Syros and Milos, Bishop of Santorini and Apostolic Administrator of Crete from 1974 to 2014. He was a member of the Order of Friars Minor Capuchin.

== Biography ==
In 1962 Papamanolis was ordained priest of the Order of Friars Minor Capuchin and on 27 June 1974 was appointed bishop, being consecrated on 20 October 1974 as Bishop of Syros and Milos, Bishop of Santorini and Apostolic Administrator of Crete. He died on 2 October 2023, at the age of 86.

Catholic Church titles
Preceded by Georges Xenopulos	Bishop of Syros e Milos; 1974–2014	Succeeded by Petros Stefanou
Preceded by Georges Xenopulos	Bishop of Santorini; 1974–2014	Succeeded by Petros Stefanou
Preceded by Georges Xenopulos	Apostolic Administrator of Crete; 1974–2014	Succeeded by Petros Stefanou
