= Theodoros Kontidis =

Greek Roman Catholic archbishop (born 1956)

The Most Reverend Theodoros Kontidis S.J.
- Archbishop of Athens; Apostolic Administrator of Rhodes
- Native name: Θεόδωρος Κοντίδης
- Church: Roman Catholic Church
- Archdiocese: Athens
- Appointed: 14 July 2021
- Predecessor: Sevastianos Rossolatos
- Other posts: Apostolic Administrator of Rhodes; Priest, Parish of Saint Andrew in Patras
- Previous posts: Priest, Parish of the Sacred Heart of Jesus in Athens

Orders
- Ordination: 9 October 1988 by Nikolaos Foskolos
- Consecration: 18 September 2021 by Sevastianos Rossolatos

Personal details
- Born: Theodoros Kontidis; 11 March 1956 (age 70) Thessaloniki, Greece
- Denomination: Catholic (Roman Rite)
- Education: Pontifical Greek College of Saint Athanasius; Pontifical Gregorian University; Centre Sèvres
- Motto: Παρακαλώ αξίως περιπατείτε της κλήσεως ης εκληθήτε ("I urge you to behave in a manner worthy of the vocation you have received")
- Coat of arms: Theodoros Kontidis's coat of arms

Theodoros Kontidis S.J. (Greek: Θεόδωρος Κοντίδης; born 11 March 1956) is a Greek Roman Catholic prelate who has served as Archbishop of Athens, apostolic administrator of Archdiocese of Rhodes. He was appointed to the episcopate as Archbishop of Athens and Apostolic administrator of Rhodes on 14 July 2021.

== Biography ==
Theodoros Kontidis was born in Thessaloniki in Greece, and was ordained as a Jesuit priest in 1988.

He was member of Pontifical Greek College of Saint Athanasius and studied philosophy and then theology at the Pontifical Gregorian University in Rome. In 1983 he entered the Jesuit order and was ordained priest on 9 October 1988 by the archbishop of Athens, Nikolaos Foskolos, in the church of the Sacred Heart. After further studies, he obtained a degree in theology from the Center Sèvres in Paris.

Father Kontidis was parish vicar and after pastor of the parish of the Sacred Heart of Jesus in Athens. In 1995 he made his solemn profession. He became responsible for the vocational pastoral and superior of the Jesuit community in Athens and director of the Manresa retreat house. Since 2021 he has been pastor of the parish of Sant'Andrew in Patras. In addition to his native Greek, he also speaks Italian, French and English.

On 14 July 2021, Pope Francis appointed him Archbishop of Athens and Apostolic administrator of Rhodes.

Catholic Church titles
Preceded by Sevastianos Rossolatos	Archbishop of Athens; 2021–	Succeeded by Incumbent
Preceded by Sevastianos Rossolatos	Apostolic Administrator of Rhodes; 2021–	Succeeded by Incumbent
