= Petros Stefanou =

Greek Catholic prelate and Bishop

The Most Reverend Petros Stefanou
- Bishop of Syros
- Native name: Πέτρος Στεφάνου
- Church: Roman Catholic Church
- Archdiocese: Syros
- See: Syros
- Appointed: 13 May 2014
- Installed: 2 July 2014
- Term ended: 11 April 2025
- Predecessor: Franghískos Papamanólis
- Successor: Georgios Altouvas

Orders
- Ordination: 15 July 1995 by Franghískos Papamanólis
- Consecration: 2 July 2014 by Franghískos Papamanólis

Personal details
- Born: Petros Stefanou; 17 August 1963 (age 63) Ermoupoli, Greece
- Education: National and Kapodistrian University of Athens
- Coat of arms

Petros Stefanou (Greek: Πέτρος Στεφάνου; born 17 August 1963 in Ermoupoli, Syros, Greece) is a Greek Roman Catholic prelate who served as a Bishop of the Diocese of Syros and Milos from 2014 until his resignation in 2025.

== Biography ==
Stefanou is a graduate of the University of Athens, in Economics. On 26 June 1994 Stefanou was ordained deacon and on 15 July 1995 Catholic priest. On 13 May 2014 Pope Francis appointed him Bishop of the Roman Catholic Diocese of Syros and Milos, Santorini and apostolic administrator of the Roman Catholic Diocese of Crete. On 2 July 2014 Stefanou was ordained bishop.

On 11 April 2025, Pope Francis accepted the resignation of Bishop Petros Stefanou from the pastoral governance of the Diocese of Syros, Milos and Santorini and from his office as Apostolic Administrator of the Diocese of Crete (Candia), Greece. Archbishop emeritus Sevastianos Rossolatos was appointed Apostolic Administrator sede vacante et ad nutum Sanctae Sedis of the same ecclesiastical jurisdictions.
