= Venediktos Printesis =

Greek Bishop of the Roman Catholic Church

The Most Reverend Venediktos Printesis
- Archbishop of Athens
- Church: Roman Catholic Church
- Archdiocese: Athens
- In office: 1959–1972
- Predecessor: Marios Makrionitis
- Successor: Nikolaos Foskolos
- Previous post: Priest

Orders
- Ordination: March 23, 1940

Personal details
- Born: February 10, 1917 Manna, Syros, Greece
- Died: October 21, 2008 (aged 91)

Venediktos Printesis (Greek: Βενέδικτος Πρίντεζης; February 10, 1917 – October 21, 2008) was a Greek Bishop of the Roman Catholic Church.

== Biography ==
Printesis was born in Manna, Syros in February 1917, and was ordained a priest on March 23, 1940. He served as a parish priest until he was appointed Archbishop of the Archdiocese of Athens on May 15, 1959. He was ordained a bishop June 21, 1959. Venediktos resigned as Archbishop on November 17, 1972.
