= Archdiocese of Athens =

Latin Catholic ecclesiastical jurisdiction in Greece

Coordinates: 37.9791°N 23.7347°E

Archdiocese of Athens Archidioecesis Atheniensis Ιερά Αρχιεπισκοπή Καθολικών Αθηνών

Catholic
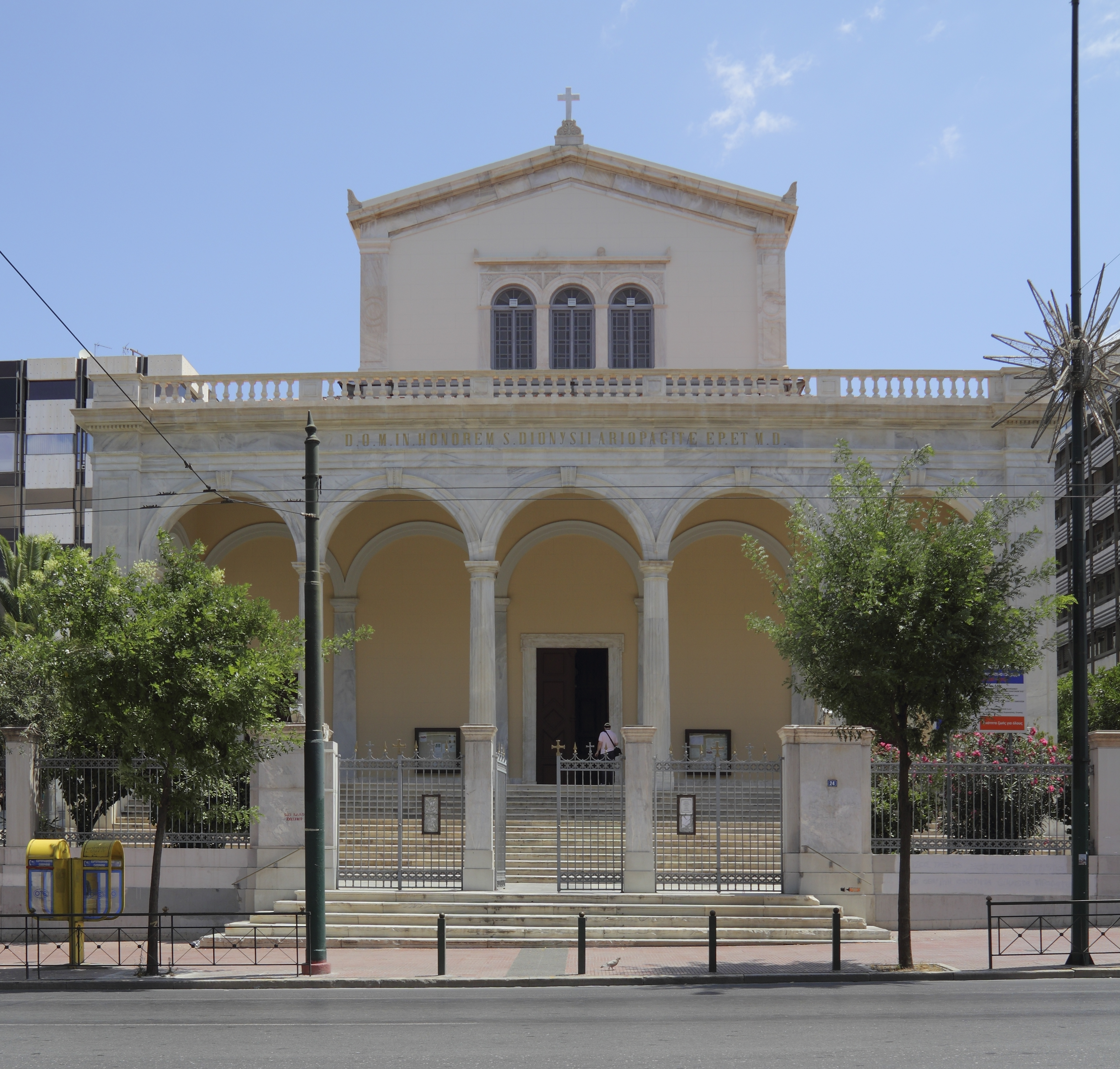
- Cathedral Basilica of St. Dionysius the Areopagite, Athens

Location
- Country: Greece
- Metropolitan: Immediately exempt to the Holy See

Statistics
- Area: 46,775 km^{2} (18,060 sq mi)
- Population: (as of 2015); 100,000 (1.6%)

Information
- Denomination: Catholic Church
- Sui iuris church: Latin Church
- Rite: Roman Rite
- Established: 23 July 1875
- Cathedral: Καθεδρικός Ναός Αγ. Διονυσίου Αρεοπαγίτου των Καθολικών (Cathedral Basilica of St. Dionysius the Areopagite)

Current leadership
- Pope: Leo XIV
- Archbishop: Theodoros Kontidis, S.J.

Map
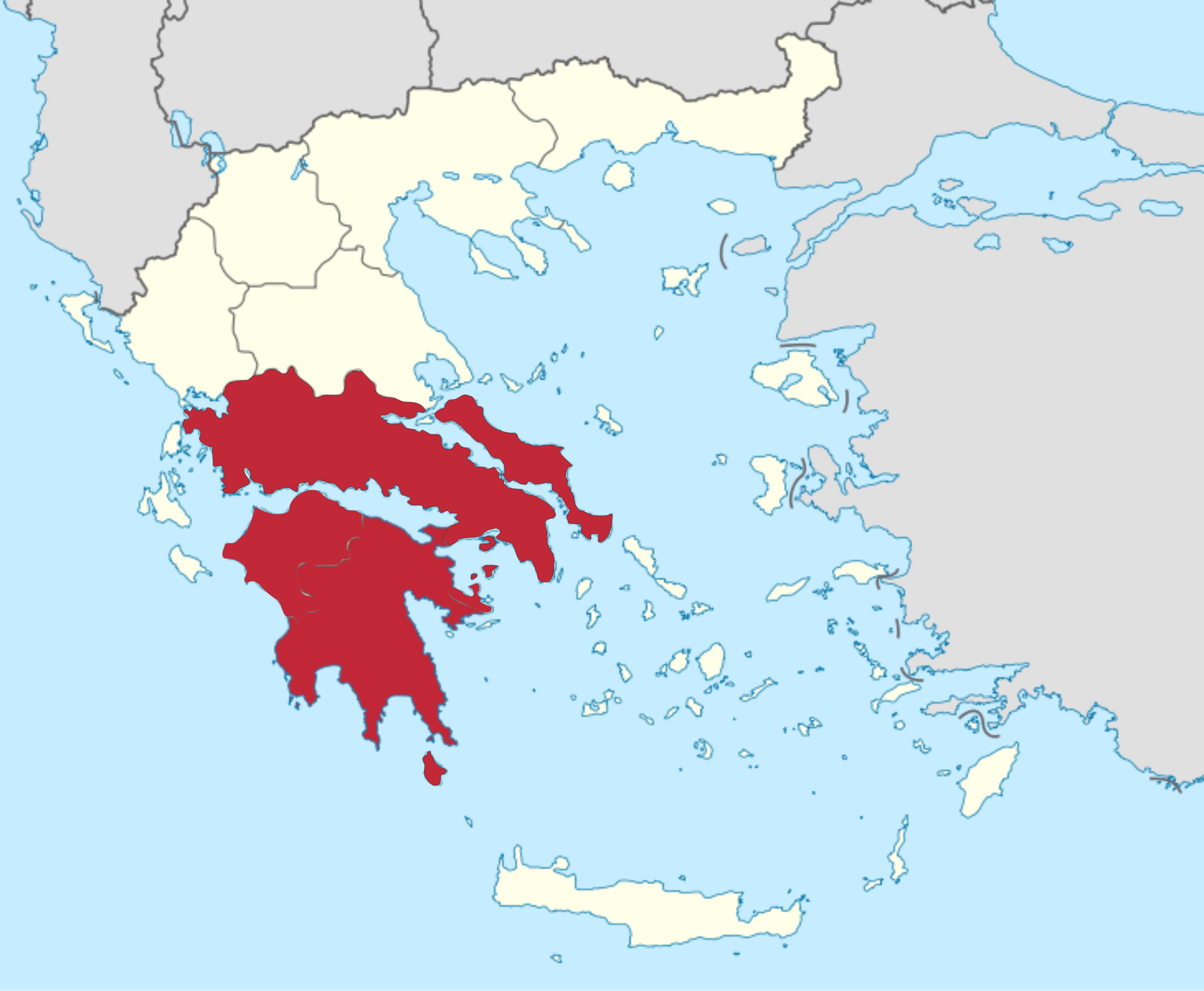

The Archdiocese of Athens (Latin: Archidioecesis Atheniensis or Athenarum) is a Latin Church ecclesiastical territory or archdiocese of the Catholic Church in Greece. Its cathedra is found within the neoclassic Cathedral Basilica of St. Dionysius the Areopagite, in the episcopal see of Athens.

== History ==
The See of Athens is one of the oldest Christian bishoprics, dating back to Hierotheos the Thesmothete in the mid-1st century AD. In ca. 800, it was raised to a metropolitan see.

In 1205, the city was captured by the Crusaders, who had conquered Constantinople and dissolved the Byzantine Empire the year before. The city's incumbent Greek Orthodox bishop, Michael Choniates, retired to the island of Kea, and a Latin Catholic archbishop was installed in his place, with the French cleric Berard being elected to the post in 1206.

The Crusaders largely maintained the ecclesiastical order they found, appointing Catholic bishops to replace the Orthodox prelates. Thus, in a letter by Pope Innocent III to Berard in 1209, 11 suffragan sees are mentioned under Athens, identical to those under Byzantine rule, although most of them were de facto vacant: Negroponte (Egripontis), Thermopylae (Cermopilensis, seat in Bodonitsa), Davleia (Davaliensem), Aulon (Abelonensem), Oreoi (Zorconensis), Karystos (Caristiensem), Koroneia (Coroniacensem), Andros (Andrensem), Megara (Megarensem), Skyros (Squirensem), and Kea (Cheensem). In the Provinciale Romanum, a list of the sees subordinate to the See of Rome, dating to some time before 1228, the number of suffragans is reduced to eight: Thermopylae, Daulia, Salona, Negroponte, Aulon, Oreoi, Megara, and Skyros.

The Catholic see remained vacant for a period after the Catalan Company conquered the Duchy of Athens in 1311 due to the Catalans' conflict with the papacy, and a residential archbishop is not attested until around the mid-14th century. Beginning with Dorotheus I ca. 1388, the Orthodox bishops of Athens, who had been continued to be appointed as titular holders since the Latin conquest, were allowed to resume residence in the city, but the Latin Archbishop retained his pre-eminent position until the conquest of the Duchy of Athens by the Ottoman Empire in 1456. The last Latin Archbishop, Nicholas Protimo, fled to Venetian-held Euboea, where he died in 1482. The Catholic see was held by titular archbishops thereafter.

On 23 July 1875, the see was restored as the modern Catholic Archdiocese of Athens, ministering to the Catholic inhabitants of the Greek capital and most of mainland Greece.

Caritas Athens, founded in 1978 and a member of Caritas Hellas, is the official social arm of the Roman Catholic Archdiocese of Athens.

== List of Archbishops of Athens ==
=== Medieval metropolitan archbishops ===
Name	Appointed	Term ended	Notes
Berard	summer 1206	1223?	Frenchman, replacing the exiled Orthodox archbishop Michael Choniates.
Corrado di Sumo	15 February 1253	?	
Uldrico	20 May 1273	?	
Stefano Mangiatero, O.P.	1300?	?	
Henry	ca. 1305		
Nicholas Salamon	1328–1351		Appointed in 1328 until his death in early 1351.
John	8 June 1351 – 1357	?	Formerly archdeacon of Candia, died in office.
Nicholas de Raynaldo	9 June 1357	?	Venetian sub-deacon, dean of Negroponte, elected by the local canons and (re)confirmed by the Pope.
Francis, O.F.M.	20 August 1365	?	Elected by the local canons and (re)confirmed by the Pope.
John	?		Unknown, except as a name.
Antonio Ballester, O.F.M.	27 March 1370	1387	Catalan, and a prominent figure of Latin Greece. Loyal to the Roman papacy during the Western Schism, vicar of the Latin Patriarch of Constantinople.
Antonio Blasi [Dexart]?, O.Merc.	14 May 1388	21 February 1403	Catalan, appointed at the request of John I of Aragon by the Avignon papacy, although Athens had been captured by the Florentine adventurer Nerio Acciaioli. Consequently, Blasi never visited Athens, until his transfer to Cagliari in 1403.
Gerard Boem, O.F.M.	1388		Appointed by the Roman papacy, represented by Bishop James of Argos as vicar in 1389-90 at least.
Lodovico Aliotti	12 June 1392	1 June 1398	Afterwards appointed Bishop of Volterra. Died 6 April 1411.
Franceschino, O.Cist.	?	9 May 1400	Died.
Andrea de Lucha, O.Carm.	6 September 140	?	
John Antony of Corinth	2 August 1426	?	
Francesco	5 November 1427	?	
Filippo Aulini	18 May 1429	?	
Nicholas Protimo	6 July 1446	1482	Last archbishop under Latin rule. Fled to Negroponte after the Ottoman conquest in 1456.

=== Titular archbishops ===
Name	Appointed	Term ended	Notes
Giovanni Nicolini	26 April 1482	?	Previously Archbishop of Amalfi.
Alexander Gordon	4 September 1551	11 November 1575	Died
Attilio Amalteo	14 August 1606	25 May 1633	Died
Gaspare Mattei	5 September 1639	14 December 1643	Afterwards appointed Cardinal-Priest of San Pancrazio
Nicolò Guidi di Bagno	14 March 1644	9 April 1657	Afterwards appointed Cardinal-Priest of Sant'Eusebio
Giacomo Altoviti	29 July 1658	18 April 1667	Afterwards appointed Titular Patriarch of Antioch
Carlo de' Vecchi	27 April 1667	13 March 1673	Died
Francesco Boccapaduli	15 July 1675	23 November 1680	Died
Marcello d'Aste	10 December 1691	3 February 1700	Afterwards appointed Archbishop of Ancona e Numana (personal title)
Filippo Antonio Gualtieri	30 March 1700	21 November 1701	Afterwards appointed Archbishop of Imola (personal title)
Giuseppe Vallemani	5 December 1701	28 November 1707	Afterwards appointed Cardinal-Priest of Santa Maria degli Angeli
Pier Marcellino Corradini	7 November 1707	21 November 1712	Afterwards appointed Cardinal-Priest of San Giovanni a Porta Latina
Silvius de Cavalieri	5 October 1712	11 January 1717	Died
Bartolomeo Massei	3 February 1721	8 January 1731	Afterwards appointed Cardinal-Priest of Sant'Agostino
Nicola Saverio Albini	8 January 1731	11 April 1740	Died
Ludovico Merlini	27 October 1740	21 July 1760	Afterwards appointed Cardinal-Priest of Santa Prisca
Giovanni Carlo Boschi	22 September 1760	21 July 1766	Afterwards appointed Cardinal-Priest of Santi Giovanni e Paolo
Ignazio Reali	26 September 1766	8 December 1767	Died
Giuseppe Maria Contesini	25 January 1768	28 February 1785	Died
Giulio Cesare Zoglio	27 June 1785	13 April 1795	Died
Camillo Campanelli	27 June 1796	23 September 1805	Afterwards appointed Archbishop of Perugia (personal title)
Giovanni Francesco Guerrieri	16 March 1808	27 September 1819	Afterwards appointed Archbishop of Rimini (personal title)
Giovanni Francesco Falzacappa	27 September 1819	10 March 1823	Afterwards appointed Archbishop of Ancona e Numana (personal title)
Filippo Filonardi	16 May 1823	3 July 1826	Afterwards appointed Archbishop of Ferrara
Francesco Tiberi Contigliano	2 October 1826	2 July 1832	Afterwards appointed Archbishop of Jesi (personal title)
Ludovico Tevoli	17 December 1832	17 October 1856	Died
Mariano Falcinelli Antoniacci, O.S.B.	21 December 1857	4 May 1874	Afterwards appointed Cardinal-Priest of San Marcello

=== Modern metropolitan archbishops ===
Incumbent	Appointed	Term ended	Notes
Ioannis Marangos	23 July 1875	17 December 1891	Died
Giuseppe Zaffino	29 April 1892	7 February 1895	Died
Caietanus Maria de Angelis, O.F.M. Conv.	10 May 1895	28 March 1900	Died
Antonio Delenda	29 April 1900	10 September 1911	Died
Louis Petit, A.A.	4 March 1912	24 June 1926	Resigned
Giovanni Battista Filippucci	25 January 1927	29 May 1947	Afterwards appointed Archbishop of Naxos, Andros, Tinos and Mykonos
Markos Sigalas	22 February 1947	10 March 1950	Died
Marios Makrionitis, S.J.	11 March 1953	8 April 1959	Died
Venediktos Printesis	15 May 1959	17 November 1972	Resigned
Nikolaos Foskolos	25 June 1973	12 August 2014	Retired
Sevastianos Rossolatos	12 August 2014	14 July 2021	Retired
Theodoros Kontidis, S.J.	14 July 2021	present	

== See also ==
- Roman Catholicism in Greece
- List of Roman Catholic dioceses in Greece
