= List of Catholic dioceses in Greece =

The Catholic Church in Greece is composed of

- a Latin hierarchy, comprising two ecclesiastical provinces (including four suffragan dioceses and an apostolic vicariate) and two dioceses immediately subject to the Holy See)
- two Eastern Catholic rite-specific particular church sui iuris jurisdictions.

== Current Latin Catholic hierarchy ==
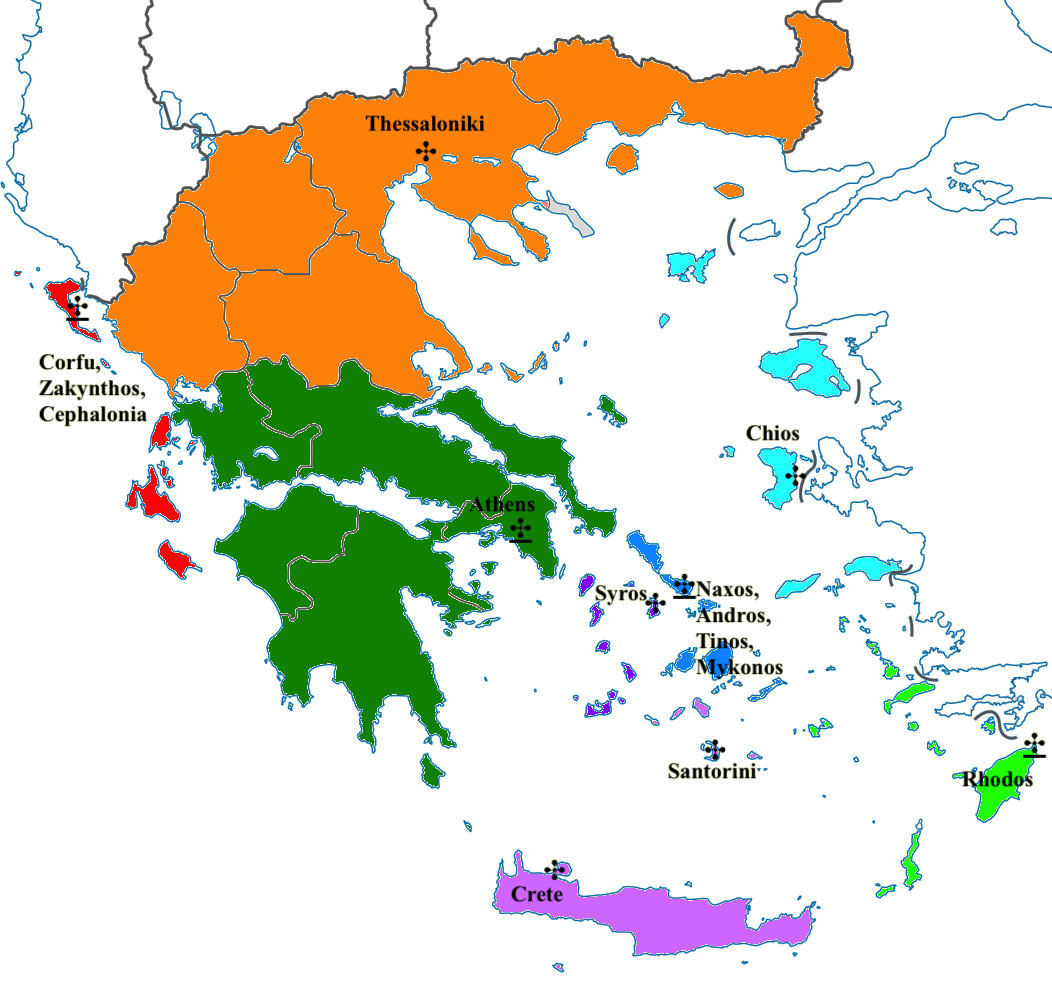
Catholic Dioceses in Greece

(Roman Rite)

=== Directly subject to the Holy See ===
- Archdiocese of Athens
- Archdiocese of Rhodes
- Apostolic Vicariate of Thessaloniki

=== Ecclesiastical Province of Corfu, Zakynthos and Cefalonia ===
- Archdiocese of Corfu, Zante and Cefalonia (nominal Metropolitan, no suffragan)

=== Ecclesiastical Province of Naxos, Andros, Tinos and Mykonos ===
- Metropolitan Archdiocese of Naxos, Andros, Tinos and Mykonos
  - Diocese of Chios
  - Diocese of Crete
  - Diocese of Santorini
  - Diocese of Syros (and united titular see Milos)

== Current Eastern Catholic jurisdictions ==
All exempt, i.e. directly subject to the Holy See, and part of Rite-specific particular churches sui iuris

Greek Catholic Church (Byzantine Rite in Greek language)

- Greek Catholic Apostolic Exarchate of Greece, with cathedral see in Athens

Armenian Catholic Church (Armenian Rite in Armenian language)

- Armenian Catholic Ordinariate of Greece

== Defunct dioceses ==
=== Titular Archbishoprics ===
Metropolitan Titular Archbishoprics

- Corinth(us), Patrae (Veteres) (Patras), Traianopolis in Rhodope, Traianopolis in Rhodope
- TO BE WIKIFIED/CHECKED : Gortyna, Larissa in Thessalia, Mitylene, Nicopolis in Epiro, Novæ Patræ, Philippi, Thebæ (Thebes), Thessalonica

Non-metropolitan Titular Archbishoprics

- TO BE WIKIFIED/CHECKED : Ægina, Ænus, Carpathus, Cassiope, Cypsela, Lemnus, Leucas, Macra, Maronea, Massimianopolis in Rhodope, Methymna, Naupactus, Rhusium, Serræ

=== Titular bishoprics ===
- TO BE WIKIFIED/CHECKED : Abdera, Achelous, Aëtus, Amphipolis, Amyclae, Anastasiopolis, Anastasiopolis, Arcadia, Ardamerium, Argos, Astypalæa, Aulon, Bargala, Berrhœa, Bolina, Bonitza, Cæsaropolis, Calydon, Campania, Canea, Cantanus, Cardicium, Carystus, Cassandria, Castoria, Cea, Cernitza, Cesarea in Thessalia, Chalcis in Græcia, Chersonesus in Creta, Christianopolis, Christopolis, Chrysopolis in Macedonia, Ciparissia, Cisamus, Citrus, Cnossus, Corone, Coronea, Cos, Cydonia, Daulia, Demetrias, Diocletiana, Dium, Doberus, Dodona, Dragobitia, Echinus, Edessa in Macedonia, Elatea, Eleutherna, Eleutheropolis in Macedonia, Elis, Epidaurum, Eressus, Eurœa in Epiro, Ezerus, Gomphi, Helos, Heraclea Pelagoniæ, Hierapytna, Hierissus, Ioannina, Ios, Kefalonia, Lacedæmonia, Lamia, Lappa, Lerus, Lete, Lidoricium, Maina, Marmarizana, Megalopolis in Peloponneso, Megara, Messene, Methone, Milos (united with current diocese of Syros), Monembasia, Mosynopolis, Mundinitza, Nauplia, Nisyrus, Olena, Opus, Oreus, Paros, Peritheorium, Pharsalus, Photice, Platæa (Plataia), Platamon, Polystylus, Porthmus, Rheon, Rhithymna (former diocese of Retimo(–Ario)), Salona, Samos, Scarphea, Sciathus, Scopelus in Thessalia, Scyrus, Serbia, Setea, Sicyon, Stagoi, Stobi, Strongyle, Strumnitza, Subrita, Tanagra, Tegea, Thasus, Thaumacus, Thebæ Phthiotides, Thespiæ, Tricca, Trœzene, Velicia, Xanthe, Zapara, Zaratovium

=== Other defunct jurisdictions ===
Latin

- Roman Catholic Diocese of Andros
- Roman Catholic Diocese of Hierapetra
- Roman Catholic Diocese of Hierapetra and Sitia
- Roman Catholic Diocese of Malvasia
- Roman Catholic Diocese of Negroponte
- Apostolic Prefecture of Rhodes and adjacent islands
- Roman Catholic Diocese of Sitia
- Roman Catholic Diocese of Tinos / Roman Catholic Diocese of Tinos-Mykonos

Eastern Catholic (Byzantine Rite)

- Bulgarian Catholic Apostolic Vicariate of Constantinople
- Bulgarian Catholic Apostolic Vicariate of Macedonia

== See also ==
- List of Catholic dioceses (structured view)
- List of Catholic dioceses (alphabetical)

== Sources and external links ==
- GCatholic.org.
- Catholic-Hierarchy entry.
