= Roman Catholic Diocese of La Canea =

Religious diocese in Greece

Coordinates: 35.515°N 24.017°E

The Roman Catholic Diocese of La Canea or Cidonia (Cydonia /sɪˈdoʊniə/) was a bishopric on Crete, with see at present Chania, and afterward was twice a Latin titular see.

== History ==
The Ancient city of Kydonia on Crete (insular Greece) had a bishop no later than the second Byzantine rule (961 AD – 1204 AD), when it was given the modern name of Chania.

The Venetians (and shortly the Genoans) who conquered Crete firmly established a Latin diocese. It was suppressed only in 1700.

=== Episcopal ordinaries ===
(incomplete? - lacking first century; all Roman Rite)

Suffragan Bishops of Kydonia/Chania

- Matteo (1300? – ?)
- Giacomo (? – 1311.05.19), later Bishop of Bisaccia (Italy) (1311.05.19 – death 1328)
- Tommaso, Dominican Order (O.P.) (1325.02.13 – 1325.06.07), later Sutri (1325.06.07 – ?)
- Filippo (1326.06.25 – ?)
- Francesco (? – ?)
- Antonio (? – ?)
- Reprandino di Santa Lucia, Friars Minor (O.F.M.) (1352.05.25 – ?), previously Bishop of Ario (Crete, Greece) (1349.07.08 – 1352.05.25)
- Marco (1364.03.16 – ?)
- Bartolomeo (1369.02.21 – ?)
- Marco Canterano, Carmelites (O. Carm.) (1389.07.12 – ?)
- Caterino Barbo, O.F.M. (1390.12.01 – ?)
- Andrea Bon (1396.04.12 – ?), previously Bishop of Caorle (northeastern Italy) (1382 – 1394.02.16) and Bishop of Pedena (1394.02.16 – 1396.04.12)
- Paolo Barozzi (1411.03.27 – ?)
- Luca Grimani di Candia (1418.05.04 – ?), previously Bishop of Retimo (1409.11.13 – 1418.05.04)
- Michele di Candia, O.P. (1451.10.01 – death 1479)
- Raimondo (? – ?)
- Antonio Ursi (1481 – death 1511)
- Paolo (1481.03.19 – ?)
- Bartolomeo Merula (1511.10.01 – ?)
- Francesco de Molendina, O.F.M. (1523.07.24 – ?)
- Agostino Donà (1525 – 1535)
- Filippo Donà (1536.01.19 – 1565)
- Alvise Dolfin (1565.10.26 – death 1587.12.12)
- Domenico Bollani (or Bolano), O.P. (1588.01.29 – death 1613)
- Andrea Corbelli (1613.02.11 – death 1614)
- Giovanni Alberto de Garzonibus (1614.02.17 – death 1619)
- Giorgio alias Georgius Perpignani (1619.07.15 – death 1621), previously Bishop of Tinos–Mykonos (insular Greece) (1594.11.14 – 1619.07.15) and Apostolic Administrator of Andros (insular Greece) (1611.05.13 – 1616.08.03)
- Bernardo Florio, Crosier Canons (O.Cruc.) (1621.06.07 – 1642.04.28), later Metropolitan Archbishop of Zadar (Croatia) (1642.04.28 – death 1656.02.14)
- Milano Benzio (1642.05.26 – death 1657)
- Giorgio Demedi = Georgius Demedus (1657.11.19 – ?) (1657.11.19 – ?)

== Titular see of Cydonia ==
As soon as the residential diocese was suppressed in 1700 it was turned into a Latin titular bishopric under the title of Cydonia (or Cidonia in Curiate Italian).

This was itself suppressed in 1933, having had the following incumbents, of the fitting Episcopal (lowest) rank, with a single exception of intermediary (archiepiscopal) rank:

- Agostino Bruti (1728.09.20 – death 1733.09.28) as emeritate; formerly Bishop of Koper (Slovenia) (1733.09.28 – 1747.10)
- Nicolas Navarre (1735.05.25 – death 1754) as Auxiliary Bishop of Archdiocese of Lyon (France) (1735.05.25 – 1754)
- Henri Hachette des Portes, Carmelites (O. Carm.) (1755.07.21 – 1771.09.23) as Auxiliary Bishop of Archdiocese of Reims (France) (1755.07.21 – 1771.09.23); next Bishop of Glandèves (1771.09.23 – death 1798)
- Michał Jerzy Poniatowski (1773.07.12 – 1785.02.14), as Coadiutor Bishop of Płock (Poland); later succeeding as Bishop of Płock (1774 – 1785.02.14), finally Metropolitan Archbishop of Gniezno (Poland) (1785.02.14 – 1794.08.12)
- Gaetano Ginanni (1775.07.17 – 1777.12.15) without actual prelature yet; next Bishop of Foligno (Italy) (1777.12.15 – death 1785.03.28)
- François-Philippe Taboureau, Benedictine Order (O.S.B.) (1778.06.01 – ? death?), without actual prelature
- Václav von Chlumčansky (1795.06.01 – 1802.03.29) as Auxiliary Bishop of Archdiocese of Praha (Prague in Bohemia, Czechia) (1795.06.01 – 1802.03.29); later Bishop of Litoměřice (Czechia) ([1801.10.15] 1802.03.29 – 1815.03.15), Metropolitan Archbishop of above Praha (Prague, Czechia) ([1814.12.30] 1815.03.15 – death 1830.06.14)
- Tomás Díez Bedoya, Capuchin Friars Minor (O.F.M. Cap.) (1825.12.19 – death 1851.12.26) as Auxiliary Bishop of Archdiocese of Santiago de Compostela (Spain) (1825.12.19 – 1851.12.26)
- Joseph Larocque (1852.07.06 – 1860.06.22) as Coadjutor Bishop of Montréal (Quebec, Canada) (1852.07.06 – 1860.06.22); next Bishop of Roman Catholic Diocese of Saint-Hyacinthe (Quebec, Canada) (1860.06.22 – retired 1866.02.04), emeritate as Titular Bishop of Germanicopolis (1867.01.15 – death 1887.11.18)

BIOs TO BE ELABORATED

- George Butler (1861.06.13 – 1864.06.04)
- Titular Archbishop José María de Jesús Yerovi Pintado, O.F.M. (1865.09.25 – 1867.04.02), Coadjutor Archbishop of Quito (Ecuador) (1865.09.25 – 1867.04.02), succeeding as Metropolitan Archbishop of Quito (1867.04.02 – 1867.06.20)
- Giovanni Battista Bagala Blasini (1868.05.12 – 1876.04.03)
- Francesco Vitagliano (1876.06.26 – 1882.03.30)
- Charles-Jacques Mouard, O.F.M. Cap. (1882.09.15 – 1888.08.08)
- Angelus Boccamazzi (1890.06.23 – 1896)
- Teofilo Massucci, O.F.M. (1896.08.24 – 1900.05.10)
- Giuseppe Candido (1901.02.04 – 1906.07.04)
- Wladyslaw Bandurski (1906.09.26 – 1932.03.06).

== Titular see of Canea ==
Apparently based on the same Cretan historical diocese, another line of titular bishops was started in 1830 under the name Canea (also Agia in Italian).

It was suppressed in 1922 having had the following incumbents, all of the fitting Episcopal (lowest) rank :

- Bishop-elect José Miguel Gordoa y Barrios (1830.10.19 – 1831.02.28), later Bishop of Guadalajara (Mexico) (1831.02.28 – death 1832.07.12)
- Jacobus Grooff (1842.09.20 – death 1852.04.29), as Apostolic Vicar of Batavia (on Java, Indonesia; now Archdiocese of Jakarta) and first Apostolic Vicar of Dutch Guyana–Suriname (Suriname) (1846.12.01 – 1852.04.29); previously last Apostolic Prefect Apostolic Prefect of above Dutch Guyana–Suriname) (1826.10.13 – 1842.09.12)
- Charles-Jean Seghers (1878.07.23 – 1878.09.28) between prelatures; later Titular Archbishop of Hemesa (1878.09.28 – 1880.12.12) as Coadjutor Archbishop of Oregon City (1878.09.18 – 1880.12.18), later succeeded as Metropolitan Archbishop of Oregon City (1880.12.18 – 1884.03.09) and Archbishop-Bishop of Vancouver Vancouver Island (BC, Canada) (1884.03.09 – 1886.11.28); previously Bishop of above Vancouver Island (1873.03.11 – 1878.09.18)
- Nicolas Donnelly (1883.10.03 – death 1920.03.29), while Auxiliary Bishop of Dublin (Ireland) (1883.10.03 – 1920.03.29)
- Eduard Graf O’Rourke (1920.04.10 – 1922.04.21), in between prelature; previously Bishop of Riga (Latvia) (1918.09.29 – 1920.04.10); later Titular Bishop of Pergamum (1922.12.21 – 1925.12.30) as Apostolic Administrator of Gdańsk (Danzig, then German Empire, now Poland) (1922.04.21 – 1925.12.30), Bishop of above Danzig (now Gdańsk, Poland) (1925.12.30 – 1938.06.13), emeritate as Titular Bishop of Sophene (1938.06.13 – death 1943.06.27).

== See also ==
- List of Catholic dioceses in Greece
- Catholic Church in Greece

== Sources and external links ==
- GigaCatholic - Cydonia, with residential and titular incumbent biography links
- Giga Catholic - La Canea, with residential and titular incumbent biography links
- Catholic Hierarchy Canea ^{[self-published]}
- Catholic Hierarchy Canea (Cydonia) ^{[self-published]}
