= Guglielmo Bruno =

Most Reverend Guglielmo Bruno
- Bishop of Andros
- Church: Catholic Church
- Diocese: Diocese of Andros
- Successor: Marino Grimani (bishop)

Personal details
- Died: 1531 Andros, Greece

Guglielmo Bruno (died 1531) was a Roman Catholic prelate who served as Bishop of Andros (1492–1531).

On 26 August 1492, Guglielmo Bruno was appointed during the papacy of Pope Alexander VI as Bishop of Andros. He served as Bishop of Andros until his death in 1531.

== See also ==
- Catholic Church in Greece

Catholic Church titles
Preceded by	Bishop of Andros; 1492–1531	Succeeded by Marino Grimani (bishop)
