= St. John the Baptist Cathedral, Santorini =

Latin Catholic church in Greece

Cathedral of St. John the Baptist
- Καθεδρικός ναός του Αγίου Ιωάννη του Βαπτιστή
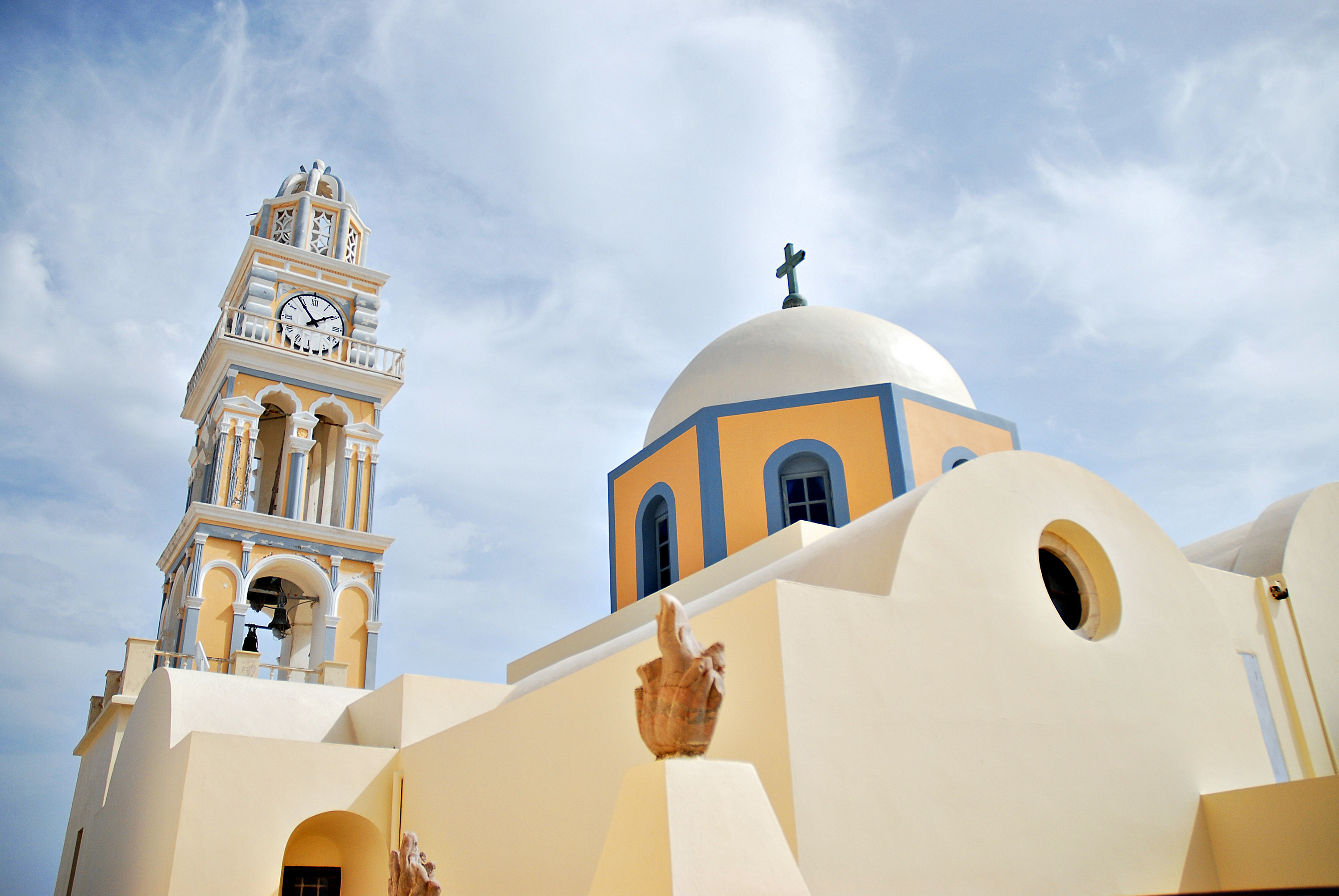
- St. John the Baptist Cathedral

- Location of the cathedral in Greece
- Cathedral of St. John the Baptist
- 36°25′13″N 25°25′50″E
- Location: Fira, Santorini
- Country: Greece
- Denomination: Catholic Church
- Sui iuris church: Latin Church

History
- Status: Cathedral
- Dedication: John the Baptist

Architecture
- Functional status: Active
- Architectural type: Church
- Style: Baroque Revival
- Completed: 1823

Administration
- Diocese: Santorini

Clergy
- Bishop: vacant (as of December 2025)

The Cathedral of St. John the Baptist (Greek: Καθεδρικός ναός του Αγίου Ιωάννη του Βαπτιστή) is a Roman Catholic cathedral located in Fira, on the island of Santorini, in the South Aegean region of Greece. The cathedral church serves as the seat of the Bishop of Santorini.

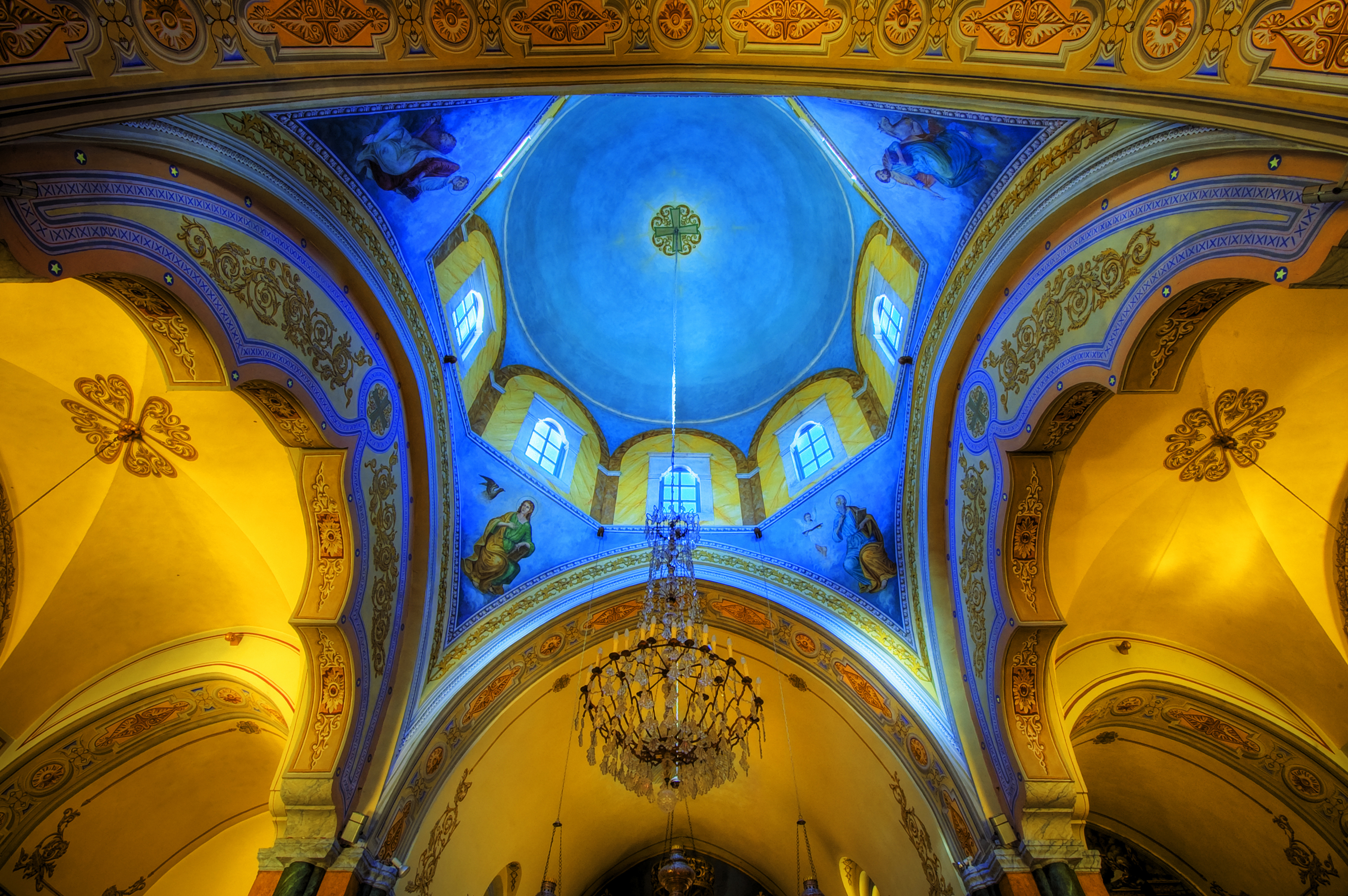
Internal view

The cathedral is located in the city center, in the Catholic neighborhood.

The Baroque Revival-style structure of blue-gray and cream, was built in 1823 and was completely restored and rebuilt in 1970, after the earthquake of 1956.

== See also ==
- Catholic Church in Greece
- List of churches in Greece
