= Bellemo =

Bellemo is an Italian surname. Notable people with the surname include:

- Alessandro Bellemo (born 1995), Italian footballer
- Bonaventura Bellemo (died 1602), Roman Catholic bishop
