= La Canea =

La Canea may refer to:

- The city Chania on Crete, Greece.
- The former Roman Catholic Diocese of La Canea, which had its see there, and was revived as Latin Catholic titular see under its curiate name Cidonia (Cydonia, the area around Chania).
