= Roman Catholic Diocese of Tinos and Mykonos =

The Roman Catholic Diocese of Tinos (and Mykonos) was a Latin suffragan diocese on some of the Aegean islands of Greece.

== History ==
The Roman Catholic diocese was established in place of the local Greek Orthodox see following the conquest of the islands by the Fourth Crusade in the early 1200s. It was renamed in 1400 to the Diocese of Tinos and Mykonos (Latin: Tinensis et Myconensis), including the island Mykonos in its title.

In 1824 it gained territory from the suppressed Roman Catholic Diocese of Andros, but did not change its name to include this title.

The diocese was finally suppressed on 3 June 1919, when its territory and titles, even that of Andros, were included in the newly renamed Roman Catholic Archdiocese of Naxos, Andros, Tinos and Mykonos (formerly the Archdiocese of Naxos).

== Episcopal ordinaries ==
=== Diocese of Tinos ===
Erected: 13th Century; Latin Name: Tinensis

- Bartolomeo de' Pasquali (? – 1328), previously Bishop of Torcello (1328 – 1335)
- Tommaso, Augustinians O.E.S.A.) (1329.03.06 – ?)
- Stefano (1346? – ?)
- Giovanni (? – death 1400?)

=== Diocese of Tinos-Mykonos ===
1400: Renamed as Diocese of Tinos and Mykonos
Latin Name: Tinensis et Myconensis

- Giacomo Endrighetti, Dominican Order (O.P.) (1400.03.31 – ?)
- Giacomo (1403.09.21 – ?)
- Pietro da Haya, Carmelites (O. Carm.) (1411.06.16 – ?)
- Antonio da Tivoli, Friars Minor (O.F.M.) (1418.08.12 – 1428.04.26), later Bishop of Eraclea (1428.04.26 – ?)
- Giacomo da Venezia, O.F.M. (1428.05.21 – death 1430)
- Marco Sclavi da Candia, O.F.M. (1430.10.25 – ?)
- Nicolò Lenda (1449.05.28 – ?)
- Nicolò (1468? – ?)
- Ridaldo (? – ?)
- Giovanni Lunari (1495.05.04 – ?)
- Alexander Scutarinus (24 Jan 1533 - 1558 Died)
- Marco Grimani (15 Feb 1559 - 1594 Died)
- Georgius Perpignani (14 Nov 1594 - 15 Jul 1619 Appointed, Bishop of Canea)
- Nicolaus Righi (7 Oct 1619 - Oct 1653 Died)
- Mauritii Doria (9 Feb 1654 - 1672 Died)
- Angelus Veniero (Angelus Venerius) (16 Jan 1673 - Dec 1699 Died)
- Pietro Martire Giustiniani, O.P. (10 May 1700 - Jan 1715 Died)
- Nicolaus Cigala (1 Jul 1716 - Apr 1738 Died)
- Luigi Guarchi (26 Sep 1738 - 31 Jan 1762 Died)
- Vencentius de Via (31 Jan 1762 Succeeded - Sep 1799 Died)
- Iosephus Maria Tobia, O.F.M. Conv. (Sep 1799 Succeeded - 21 Feb 1809 Appointed, Bishop of Santorini)
- Andrea Veggetti (21 Feb 1809 - 8 Mar 1816 Appointed, Archbishop of Naxos)
- Ignazio Palmidessa, O.P. (31 May 1816 - 12 Aug 1817 Died)
- Giovanni Collaro (16 Mar 1818 - 3 Jan 1826 Died)
- Giorgio Gabinelli (3 Jul 1826 - 7 Jul 1843 Resigned)
- Francesco Zaloni (7 Jul 1843 Succeeded - 29 Jun 1866 Died)
- Giovanni Marangò (Marengo) (29 Jun 1866 Succeeded - 23 Jul 1875 Appointed, Roman Catholic Archbishop of Athens)
- Ignazio Nicolaus Giustiniani (30 Jul 1875 - 13 May 1879 Appointed, Roman Catholic Bishop of Chios)
- Michele Castelli (13 May 1879 - 7 Sep 1898 Died)
- Francesco di Mento (5 Jun 1899 - 21 Sep 1904 Died)
- Ioannis Privilegio (12 Apr 1905 - 9 Aug 1914 Resigned)
- Matteo Vido (9 Mar 1915 - 3 Jul 1919 Appointed, Archbishop of Naxos, Andros, Tinos and Mykonos)

3 June 1919 United with the Diocese of Andros, the Archdiocese of Naxos, and the Diocese of Tinos to form the Roman Catholic Archdiocese of Naxos, Tinos, Andros and Mykonos

== See also ==
- Roman Catholic Diocese of Tino (curiate name of Knin bishopric, in Croatia)
