= Nikolaos Printezis =

- Archbishop Emeritus of Naxos, Andros, Tinos and Mykonos
- Church: Roman Catholic Church
- Archdiocese: Naxos, Andros, Tinos and Mykonos
- Appointed: 29 April 1993
- Installed: 29 April 1993
- Term ended: 25 January 2021
- Predecessor: Ioannis Perris
- Opposed to: Josif Printezis

Orders
- Ordination: 19 December 1965
- Consecration: 4 July 1993 by Ioannis Perris

Personal details
- Born: Nikolaos Printezis; 21 February 1941 (age 85) Vari, Greece

Nikolaos Printezis or Printesis (Greek: Νικόλαος Πρίντεζης; born 21 February 1941) is the former Roman Catholic Archbishop of Naxos, Andros, Tinos and Mykonos and former Apostolic Administrator of Chios.

== Biography ==
On 19 December 1965 Printezis was ordained priest. On 29 April 1993 he was appointed archbishop of Naxos, Andros, Tinos and Mykonos and Apostolic Administrator of Chios by Pope John Paul II and on 4 July 1993 he was ordained bishop by Ioannis Perris, his predecessor. He retired on 25 January 2021.
