= Andreas Polykarpos Timonis =

Andreas Polykarpos Timonis (Greek: Ανδρέας Πολύκαρπος Τιμόνης), also referred under the italianized form Andrea Policarpo Timoni (14 March 1833, in Chios – 25 July 1904) was Roman Catholic Bishop of Chios from 30 July 1875 to 13 May 1879 and Archbishop of İzmir from then until his death in 1904.
