= Pietro Martire Giustiniani =

Most Reverend Pietro Martire Giustiniani
- Archbishop (Personal Title) of Tinos
- Church: Catholic Church
- Diocese: Diocese of Tinos
- In office: 1700–1715
- Predecessor: Angelus Veniero
- Successor: Nicolaus Cigala

Orders
- Consecration: 13 January 1692 by Galeazzo Marescotti

Personal details
- Born: 1645 Chios, Greece
- Died: January 1715 (age 70) Tinos, Greece

Pietro Martire Giustiniani, O.P. (1645–1715) was a Roman Catholic prelate who served as Archbishop (Personal Title) of Tinos (1700–1715) and Archbishop of Naxos (1691–1700).

== Biography ==
Pietro Martire Giustiniani was born in Chios, Greece in 1645 and ordained a priest in the Order of Preachers. On 10 December 1691, he was appointed during the papacy of Pope Innocent XII as Archbishop (Personal Title) of Tinos. On 13 January 1692, he was consecrated bishop by Galeazzo Marescotti, Cardinal-Priest of Santi Quirico e Giulitta, with Giuseppe Bologna, Archbishop of Capua, and Stefano Giuseppe Menatti, Titular Bishop of Cyrene, serving as co-consecrators. On 10 May 1700, he was appointed during the papacy of Pope Innocent XII as Bishop of Tinos. He served as Bishop of Tinos until his death in January 1715.

== External links and additional sources ==
- Cheney, David M. "Archdiocese of Naxos, Andros, Tinos e Mykonos". Catholic-Hierarchy.org. (for Chronology of Bishops) ^{[self-published]}
- Chow, Gabriel. "Metropolitan Archdiocese of Naxos–Andros–Tinos–Mykonos (Greece)". GCatholic.org. (for Chronology of Bishops) ^{[self-published]}
- Cheney, David M. "Diocese of Tinos". Catholic-Hierarchy.org. (for Chronology of Bishops) ^{[self-published]}
- Chow, Gabriel. "Diocese of Tinos–Mykonos". GCatholic.org. (for Chronology of Bishops) ^{[self-published]}

Catholic Church titles
Preceded by Bartolomeo Polla	Archbishop of Naxos; 1691–1700	Succeeded by Antonio Giustiniani
Preceded by Angelus Veniero	Archbishop (Personal Title) of Tinos; 1700–1715	Succeeded by Nicolaus Cigala
