= Georgius Perpignani =

Greek Roman Catholic prelate

Most Reverend Georgius Perpignani
- Bishop of Canea
- Church: Catholic Church
- In office: 1619–1621
- Predecessor: Joannes Albertus de Garzoni
- Successor: Bernardo Florio
- Previous post: Bishop of Tinos (1594–1619)

Orders
- Consecration: 20 November 1594 by Gianfrancesco Morosini

Personal details
- Born: 1555 Crete, Greece
- Died: 1621 (age 66) Canea, Greece

Georgius Perpignani (1555–1621) was a Roman Catholic prelate who served as Bishop of Canea (1619–1621) and Bishop of Tinos (1594–1619).

== Biography ==
Georgius Perpignani was born in Crete in 1555. On 14 November 1594, he was appointed during the papacy of Pope Clement VIII as Bishop of Tinos. On 20 November 1594, he was consecrated bishop by Gianfrancesco Morosini, Bishop of Brescia, with Flaminio Filonardi, Bishop of Aquino, and Leonard Abel, Titular Bishop of Sidon, serving as co-consecrators. On 15 July 1619, he was appointed during the papacy of Pope Paul V as Bishop of Canea. He served as Bishop of Canea until his death in 1621. While bishop, he was the principal co-consecrator of Juan Orozco Covarrubias y Leiva, Bishop of Agrigento.

== External links and additional sources ==
- Cheney, David M. "Diocese of Tinos". Catholic-Hierarchy.org. (for Chronology of Bishops) ^{[self-published]}
- Chow, Gabriel. "Diocese of Tinos–Mykonos". GCatholic.org. (for Chronology of Bishops) ^{[self-published]}

Catholic Church titles
Preceded by Marco Griman	Bishop of Tinos; 1594–1619	Succeeded by Nicolaus Righi
Preceded by Joannes Albertus de Garzoni	Bishop of Canea; 1619–1621	Succeeded by Bernardo Florio
