= Eustache Fontana =

Roman Catholic prelate

Most Reverend Eustache Fontana
- Bishop of Andros
- Church: Catholic Church
- Diocese: Diocese of Andros
- In office: 1602–1611
- Predecessor: Bonaventura Bellemo
- Successor: Nicolaus Righi

Orders
- Consecration: 18 August 1602 by Girolamo Bernerio

Personal details
- Died: 1611 Andros, Greece

Eustache Fontana, O.P. (died 1611) was a Roman Catholic prelate who served as Bishop of Andros (1602–1611).

== Biography ==
Eustache Fontana was ordained a priest in the Order of Preachers. On 12 August 1602, he was appointed during the papacy of Pope Clement VIII as Bishop of Andros. On 18 August 1602, he was consecrated bishop by Girolamo Bernerio, Bishop of Ascoli Piceno, with Aurelio Novarini, Bishop of San Marco, and Agostino Quinzio, Bishop of Korčula, serving as co-consecrators. He served as Bishop of Andros until his death in 1611.

Catholic Church titles
Preceded by Bonaventura Bellemo	Bishop of Andros; 1602–1611	Succeeded by Nicolaus Righi
