= Acenario López =

Most Reverend Acenario López
- Bishop of Santorini
- Church: Catholic Church
- Diocese: Diocese of Santorini
- In office: 1516–1521
- Successor: Santiago Calatayud

Personal details
- Died: 1521 Santorini, Greece

Acenario López or Agennatius López (died 1521) was a Roman Catholic prelate who served as Bishop of Santorini (1516–1521).

== Biography ==
On 31 Mar 1516, Acenario López was appointed during the papacy of Pope Leo X as Bishop of Santorini. He served as Bishop of Santorini until his death in 1521.

Catholic Church titles
Preceded by	Bishop of Santorini; 1516–1521	Succeeded by Santiago Calatayud
