= Agostino Kont de Bruti =

Agostino Kont de Bruti (b. May 1682, Koper - d. 1747) was the Bishop of Koper, member of the Albanian medieval Bruti family, in Venice. He entered the Dominican order in the city and studied theology in Padua. He also served as the secretary to the Duke and Cornara of Venice in Rome. In 1707 he was an ordained priest, and in 1728 he was appointed bishop of Cydonia. In 1733 he became the archbishop of Hania (Canea) in Crete. He died in 1747 and is buried in the chapel of the Carmelite Mother of God, in the baptistery of St. John the Baptist (Rotunda), which is testified by two stone tablets and a grieving speech written by city writer and speaker Giuseppe Bonzio. He was a priest for 40 years and a bishop for 18. He also served the Duoda family from Shkoder who produced vice consultants in Venice.
