= Paulus Pucciarelli =

Roman Catholic prelate

Most Reverend Paulus Pucciarelli
- Bishop of Andros
- Church: Catholic Church
- Diocese: Diocese of Andros
- In office: 1621–1631
- Predecessor: Nicolaus Righi
- Successor: Albertus Aliprandi

Orders
- Consecration: 13 June 1621 by Giovanni Garzia Mellini

Personal details
- Born: 1583
- Died: 1631 (age 48) Andros, Greece

Paulus Pucciarelli, O.P. (1583–1631) was a Roman Catholic prelate who served as Bishop of Andros (1621–1631).

== Biography ==
Paulus Pucciarelli was born in 1583 and ordained a priest in the Order of Preachers. On 7 June 1621, he was appointed during the papacy of Pope Paul V as Bishop of Andros. On 13 June 1621, he was consecrated bishop by Giovanni Garzia Mellini, Cardinal-Priest of Santi Quattro Coronati with Paolo De Curtis, Bishop Emeritus of Isernia, and Girolamo Ricciulli, Bishop of Belcastro, serving as co-consecrators. He served as Bishop of Andros until his death in 1631. While bishop, he was the principal co-consecrator of Francesco Sperelli, Coadjutor Bishop of San Severino (1621).

Catholic Church titles
| Preceded by Nicolaus Righi | Bishop of Andros; 1621–1631 | Succeeded by Albertus Aliprandi |
