= Diocese of Santorini =

Roman Catholic diocese in Greece

Coordinates: 36.4206°N 25.4306°E

Diocese of Santorini Dioecesis Sanctoriensis Επισκοπή Θήρας

Catholic
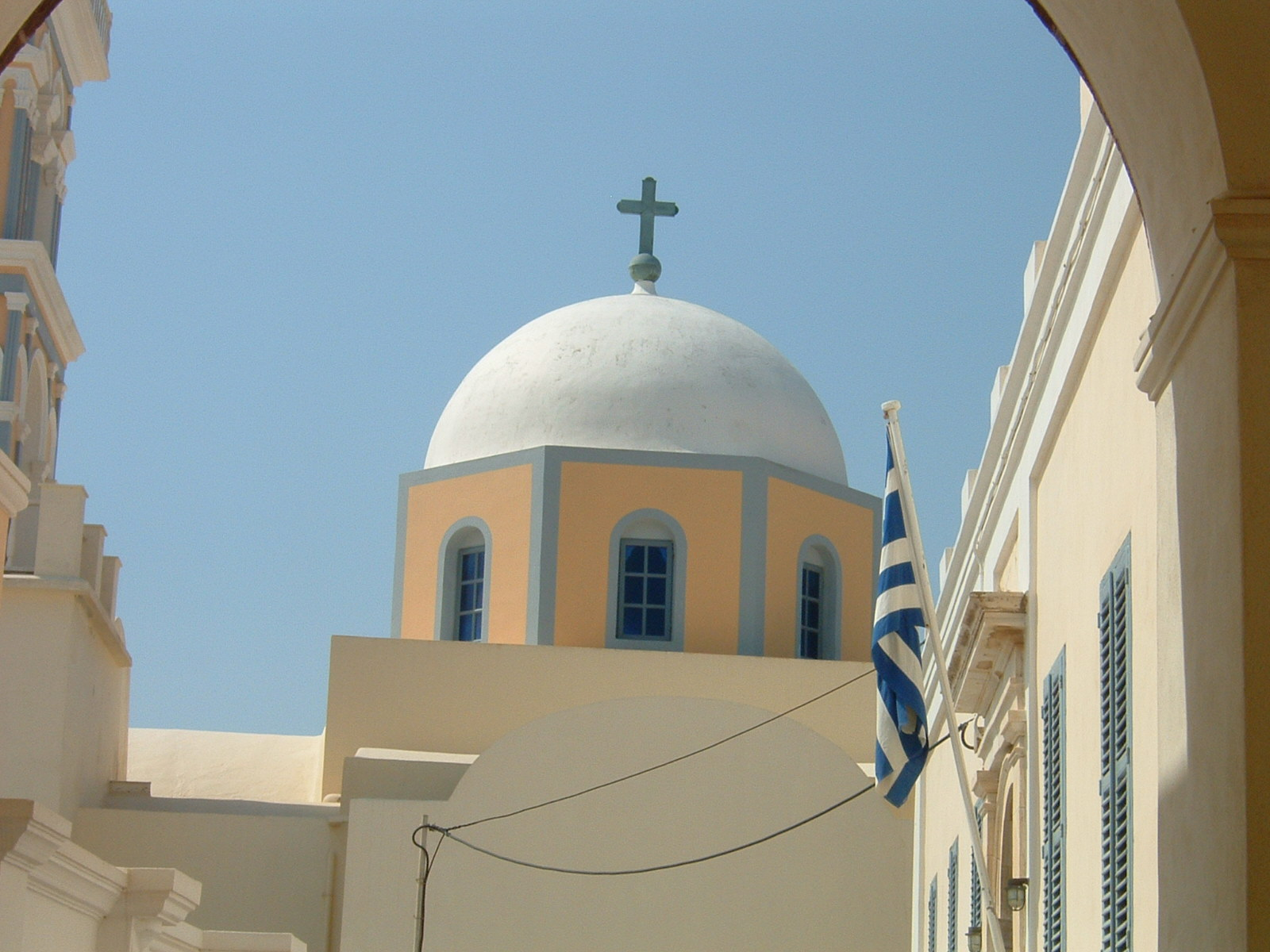
- Cathedral of St. John the Baptist

Location
- Country: Greece
- Ecclesiastical province: Naxos, Andros, Tinos and Mykonos
- Metropolitan: Naxos, Andros, Tinos and Mykonos

Statistics
- Area: 495 km^{2} (191 sq mi)
- Population: Total; Catholics: (as of 2010); 12,366; 450 (4%)

Information
- Sui iuris church: Latin Church
- Rite: Latin Rite
- Established: 1204
- Cathedral: Cathedral of St. John the Baptist

Current leadership
- Pope: Leo XIV
- Bishop: Petros Stefanou
- Metropolitan Archbishop: Josif Printezis

The Roman Catholic Diocese of Santorini (Latin: Dioecesis Sanctoriensis) is a diocese of the Catholic Church located in the city of Santorini in the ecclesiastical province of Naxos, Andros, Tinos and Mykonos in Greece.

== History ==
- 1204: Established as Diocese of Santorini, also called Diocese of Thera

== Ordinaries ==
- Agostino (16 Nov 1477 Ordained Bishop – 1494 died)

...

- Acenario López (31 Mar 1516 – 1521 died)
- Santiago Calatayud, OSA (20 Feb 1521 – 1526 died)
- Rodrigo de Beniambras (11 Mar 1527 – 1535 died)
- Benedetto, OCist (6 Aug 1535 – 1539 died)
- Dionisio de Avila, OdeM (29 Oct 1539 – 1552 died)
- Ludovico de Argentis (12 Sep 1552 – )
- Marco Lauro, OP (16 Dec 1555 – 26 Jan 1560 appointed, Bishop of Satriano e Campagna)
- Domenico di Grammatica (26 Apr 1560 – 1565 died)
- Bernardo Lauro, OP (12 Oct 1565 – 7 Oct 1583 appointed, Bishop of Milos)
- Angelo di Cipro, OP (7 Nov 1583 – 1585 resigned)
- Bernardo Lauro, OP (27 Nov 1585 – 1588 died)
- Antonio de Marchi (16 Mar 1588 – )
- Pietro de Marchi, OP (18 Apr 1611 – 19 Feb 1625 appointed, Archbishop of Izmir)
- Giovanni Maria Galli (bishop), OFM (21 Apr 1625 – )
- Andrea Soffiani (4 Mar 1630 – 10 Mar 1642 appointed, Roman Catholic Bishop of Chios)
- Gerolamo de Paduano, OFM (16 Jun 1642 – 26 Dec 1666 died)
- Francesco Santaggi (14 May 1668 – Aug 1686 died)
- Giovanni d'Aviani (12 Aug 1686 – 1687 died)
- Francesco Crispo (24 Nov 1687 – Feb 1714 died)
- Luigi Guarchi (1 Oct 1714 – 26 Sep 1738 appointed, Bishop of Tinos)
- Francesco Antonio Razzolini, OFMConv (14 Dec 1739 – 7 May 1746 resigned)
- Domenico Mainetta (19 Dec 1746 – 20 Feb 1758 resigned)
- Giovanni Battista Crispi (19 Jul 1758 – 12 Jul 1773 appointed, Archbishop of Naxos)
- Giorgio Stay (12 Jul 1773 – 16 May 1774 died)
- Pietro Delenda (27 Jun 1774 – 20 Mar 1807 died)
- Iosephus Maria Tobia, OFMConv (21 Feb 1809 – 19 Jul 1815 died)
- Caspar Delenda (19 Jul 1815 – 16 Sep 1825 died)
- Luca de Cigalla (15 Dec 1828 – 12 Feb 1847 died)
- François Cuculla (10 Sep 1847 – 14 Jan 1853 appointed, Archbishop of Naxos)
- Niccola Adolfo Marinelli (14 Jan 1853 – 9 Dec 1855 resigned)
- Lorenzo Bergeretti (29 Jul 1856 – 22 Aug 1862 appointed, Coadjutor Archbishop of Naxos)
- Fedele Abbati (Abati), OFM (27 Mar 1863 – 16 Oct 1877 resigned)
- Antonio Galibert (4 Feb 1879 – 8 Aug 1906 died)
- Michele Camilleri (1 Jul 1907 – 19 Mar 1931 died)
- Timoteo Giorgio Raymundos, OFMCap (12 Jan 1932 – 4 May 1945 resigned)
- Georges Xenopulos, SJ (22 Feb 1947 – 27 Jun 1974 retired)
- Frangkiskos Papamanolis, OFMCap (27 Jun 1974 – 13 May 2014 retired)
- Petros Stefanou (13 May 2014 –

== See also ==
- Roman Catholicism in Greece
