= Bernardo Florio =

Italian Roman Catholic prelate (1587–1656)

Most Reverend Bernardo Florio
- Archbishop of Zadar
- Church: Catholic Church
- Archdiocese: Archdiocese of Zadar
- In office: 1621–1642
- Predecessor: Benedetto Cappello
- Successor: Teodoro Balbo
- Previous post: Bishop of Canea (1642–1656)

Orders
- Consecration: 13 June 1621 by Giovanni Garzia Mellini

Personal details
- Born: 1587 Venice, Italy
- Died: 14 February 1656 (age 69) Zadar, Croatia

Bernardo Florio, O.Cruc. (1587 – 14 February 1656) was a Roman Catholic prelate who served as Archbishop of Zadar (1621–1642) and Bishop of Canea (1642–1656).

== Biography ==
Bernardo Florio was born in Venice, Italy, in 1587 and ordained a priest in the Canons Regular of the Order of the Holy Cross. On 7 June 1621, he was appointed during the papacy of Pope Paul V as Bishop of Canea. On 13 June 1621, he was consecrated bishop by Giovanni Garzia Mellini, Cardinal-Priest of Santi Quattro Coronati with Paolo De Curtis, Bishop Emeritus of Isernia, and Girolamo Ricciulli, Bishop of Belcastro, serving as co-consecrators. On 28 April 1642, he was appointed during the papacy of Pope Urban VIII as Archbishop of Zadar. He served as Archbishop of Zadar until his death on 14 February 1656.

== Episcopal succession ==
While bishop, he was the principal co-consecrator of:

- Marino Badoer, Bishop of Pula (1641);
- Vincenzo Milani, Bishop of Caorle (1641);
- Paolo Ciera, Bishop of Vieste (1642); and
- Milano Bencio, Bishop of Canea (1642).

== External links and additional sources ==
- Cheney, David M. "Archdiocese of Zadar (Zara)". Catholic-Hierarchy.org. (for Chronology of Bishops) ^{[self-published]}
- Chow, Gabriel. "Archdiocese of Zadar (Croatia)". GCatholic.org. (for Chronology of Bishops) ^{[self-published]}

Catholic Church titles
Preceded by Georgius Perpignani	Bishop of Canea; 1642–1656	Succeeded by Milano Bencio
Preceded by Benedetto Cappello	Archbishop of Zadar; 1621–1642	Succeeded by Teodoro Balbo
