= Antonio de Marchi =

Most Reverend Antonio de Marchi
- Bishop of Santorini
- Church: Catholic Church
- Diocese: Diocese of Santorini
- In office: 1588–?
- Predecessor: Bernardo Lauro
- Successor: Pietro de Marchi

Orders
- Consecration: 27 Mar 1588 by Giulio Antonio Santorio

Antonio de Marchi was a Roman Catholic prelate who served as Bishop of Santorini (1588–?).

== Biography ==
On 16 Mar 1588, he was appointed during the papacy of Pope Sixtus V as Bishop of Santorini. On 27 Mar 1588, he was consecrated bishop by Giulio Antonio Santorio, Cardinal-Priest of San Bartolomeo all'Isola. It is uncertain how long he served; the next bishop of record was Pietro de Marchi, who was appointed in 1611.

Catholic Church titles
Preceded by Bernardo Lauro	Bishop of Santorini; 1588–?	Succeeded by Pietro de Marchi
