= Marco Giustiniani (bishop of Chios) =

Roman Catholic prelate

Most Reverend Marco Giustiniani
- Roman Catholic Bishop of Chios
- Church: Catholic Church
- Diocese: Roman Catholic Diocese of Chios
- In office: 1604–1640
- Predecessor: Girolamo Giustiniani
- Successor: Andrea Soffiani

Orders
- Consecration: 12 June 1604 by Girolamo Bernerio

Personal details
- Born: 1547 Chios, Greece
- Died: 1640 (aged 92–93) Chios, Greece

Marco Giustiniani (1547–1640) was a Roman Catholic prelate who served as Roman Catholic Bishop of Chios (1604–1640).

== Biography ==
Marco Giustiniani was ordained a priest in the Order of Preachers. On 31 May 1604, he was appointed as Bishop of Chios during the papacy of Pope Gregory XIII. On 12 June 1604, he was consecrated bishop by Girolamo Bernerio, Cardinal-Bishop of Albano, with Agostino Quinzio, Bishop of Korčula, and Vincenzo Giustiniani, Bishop of Gravina di Puglia, serving as co-consecrators. He served as the local bishop until his death in 1640.

Catholic Church titles
Preceded by Girolamo Giustiniani	Roman Catholic Bishop of Chios; 1604–1640	Succeeded by Andrea Soffiani
