= Dionisio de Avila =

Roman Catholic bishop

Most Reverend Dionisio de Avila
- Bishop of Santorini
- Church: Catholic Church
- Diocese: Diocese of Santorini
- In office: 1539–1552
- Predecessor: Benedetto
- Successor: Ludovico de Argentis

Personal details
- Died: 1552 Santorini, Greece

Dionisio de Avila, O. de M. (died 1552) was a Roman Catholic prelate who served as Bishop of Santorini (1539–1552).

== Biography ==
Dionisio de Avilawas ordained a priest in the Order of the Blessed Virgin Mary of Mercy. On 29 Oct 1539, he was appointed during the papacy of Pope Paul III as Bishop of Santorini. He served as Bishop of Santorini until his death in 1552.

Catholic Church titles
Preceded by Benedetto	Bishop of Santorini; 1539–1552	Succeeded by Ludovico de Argentis
