= Rodrigo de Beniambras =

Most Reverend Rodrigo de Beniambras
- Bishop of Santorini
- Church: Catholic Church
- Diocese: Diocese of Santorini
- In office: 1527–1535
- Predecessor: Santiago Calatayud
- Successor: Benedetto

Personal details
- Died: 1535 Santorini, Greece

Rodrigo de Beniambras or Rodrigo di Beniambras (died 1535) was a Roman Catholic prelate who served as Bishop of Santorini (1527–1535).

== Biography ==
On 11 Mar 1527, Rodrigo de Beniambras was appointed during the papacy of Pope Clement VII as Bishop of Santorini. He served as Bishop of Santorini until his death in 1535.

Catholic Church titles
Preceded by Santiago Calatayud	Bishop of Santorini; 1527–1535	Succeeded by Benedetto
