= Antonio Giustiniani (archbishop of Naxos) =

Greek Roman Catholic prelate

Most Reverend Antonio Giustiniani
- Archbishop of Naxos
- Church: Catholic Church
- Archdiocese: Archdiocese of Naxos
- In office: 1701–1730
- Predecessor: Pietro Martire Giustiniani
- Successor: Giovanni Francesco Bossi
- Previous posts: Vicar Apostolic of Smyrna (1690–1694); Bishop of Syros and Milos (1694–1701)

Orders
- Consecration: 2 May 1694 by Odoardo Cibo

Personal details
- Born: 17 June 1663 Naxos, Greece
- Died: March 1730 (aged 66) Naxos, Greece

Antonio Giustiniani" (17 June 1663 – March 1730) was a Roman Catholic prelate who served as Roman Catholic Archbishop of Naxos (1701–1730), Bishop of Syros and Milos (1694–1701), and Vicar Apostolic of Smyrna (1690–1694).

== Biography ==
Antonio Giustiniani was born in Naxos, Greece on 17 June 1663. On 13 January 1690, he was appointed during the papacy of Pope Alexander VIII as Vicar Apostolic of Smyrna. On 8 February 1694, he was appointed during the papacy of Pope Innocent XII as Bishop of Syros and Milos. On 2 May 1694, he was consecrated bishop by Odoardo Cibo, Titular Patriarch of Constantinople. On 24 January 1701, he was appointed during the papacy of Pope Clement XI as Archbishop of Naxos. He served as Archbishop of Naxos until his death in March 1730.

== External links and additional sources ==
- Cheney, David M. "Archdiocese of Naxos, Andros, Tinos e Mykonos". Catholic-Hierarchy.org. (for Chronology of Bishops) ^{[self-published]}
- Chow, Gabriel. "Metropolitan Archdiocese of Naxos–Andros–Tinos–Mykonos (Greece)". GCatholic.org. (for Chronology of Bishops) ^{[self-published]}

Catholic Church titles
Preceded by	Vicar Apostolic of Smyrna; 1690–1694	Succeeded by
Preceded by Giuseppe Guarchi	Bishop of Syros and Milos; 1694–1701	Succeeded by Michele Caro
Preceded by Pietro Martire Giustiniani	Archbishop of Naxos; 1701–1730	Succeeded by Giovanni Francesco Bossi
