= Santiago Calatayud =

Most Reverend Santiago Calatayud
- Bishop of Santorini
- Church: Catholic Church
- Diocese: Diocese of Santorini
- In office: 1521–1526
- Predecessor: Acenario López
- Successor: Rodrigo de Beniambras

Personal details
- Died: 1526 Santorini, Greece

Santiago Calatayud, O.S.A. or Giacomo da Calatayud (died 1526) was a Roman Catholic prelate who served as Bishop of Santorini (1521–1526).

== Biography ==
Santiago Calatayud was ordained a priest in the Order of Saint Augustine. On 20 Feb 1521, he was appointed during the papacy of Pope Leo X as Bishop of Santorini. He served as Bishop of Santorini until his death in 1526.

Catholic Church titles
Preceded by Acenario López	Bishop of Santorini; 1521–1526	Succeeded by Rodrigo de Beniambras
