= Diocese of Andros =

The Roman Catholic Diocese of Andros was a Latin Catholic bishopric in insular Greece. In 1919, it was absorbed by the Roman Catholic Archdiocese of Naxos, Andros, Tinos and Mykonos.

== Ordinaries ==
=== Diocese of Andros ===
Erected: 13th Century
Latin Name: Andrensis

- Guglielmo Bruno (26 Aug 1492 - 1531 Died)
- Marino Grimani (6 Sep 1531 - )
- Bonaventura Bellemo, O.F.M. (22 Jun 1587 - 1602 Died)
- Eustache Fontana, O.P. (12 Aug 1602 - 1611 Died)
- Nicolaus Righi (3 Aug 1616 - 7 Oct 1619 Appointed, Bishop of Tinos)
- Paulus Pucciarelli, O.P. (7 Jun 1621 - 1631)
- Albertus Aliprandi (28 Apr 1631 - 1634 Died)
- Dominici de Grammatica (12 Jun 1634 - 1656 Died)
- Giovanni Battista Paterio (12 Sep 1672 - )
- Ignatius Rosa (27 May 1675 - 1698 Died)

3 June 1919 United with the Diocese of Mykonos, the Archdiocese of Naxos, and the Diocese of Tinos to form the Archdiocese of Naxos, Andros, Tinos e Mykonos

== See also ==
- Catholic Church in Greece
