= Bonaventura Bellemo =

Most Reverend Bonaventura Bellemo
- Bishop of Andros
- Church: Catholic Church
- Diocese: Diocese of Andros
- In office: 1587–1602
- Predecessor: Marino Grimani
- Successor: Eustache Fontana

Orders
- Consecration: 12 July 1587 by Giulio Antonio Santorio

Personal details
- Died: 1602 Andros, Greece

Bonaventura Bellemo, O.F.M. (died 1602) was a Roman Catholic prelate who served as Bishop of Andros (1587–1602).

== Biography ==
Bonaventura Bellemo was ordained a priest in the Order of Friars Minor. On 22 June 1587, he was appointed during the papacy of Pope Sixtus V as Bishop of Andros. On 12 July 1587, he was consecrated bishop by Giulio Antonio Santorio, Cardinal-Priest of San Bartolomeo all'Isola, with Ladislao d'Aquino, Bishop of Venafro, and Leonard Abel, Titular Bishop of Sidon, serving as co-consecrators. He served as Bishop of Andros until his death in 1602.

Catholic Church titles
| Preceded by Marino Grimani | Bishop of Andros; 1587–1602 | Succeeded by Eustache Fontana |
