= Josif Printezis =

Greek Roman Catholic prelate (born 1970)

- Archbishop of Naxos, Andros, Tinos and Mykonos
- Church: Catholic Church
- Archdiocese: Naxos, Andros, Tinos and Mykonos
- Appointed: 25 January 2021
- Predecessor: Nikolaos Printezis
- Other post: Apostolic Administrator of Chios (since 2021)

Orders
- Ordination: 15 July 1995 by Frangiskos Papamanolis
- Consecration: 23 May 2021 by Nikolaos Printezis

Personal details
- Born: Josif Printezis; 6 February 1970 (age 56) Poseidonia, Syros, Greece
- Education: Saint John's Seminary (Massachusetts)
- Motto: Ἐμοὶ γὰρ τὸ ζῆν Χριστός
- Coat of arms: Josif Printezis's coat of arms

Josif Printezis (Greek: Ιωσήφ Πρίντεζης; born 6 February 1970) is a Greek Roman Catholic prelate who serves as the Archbishop of Naxos, Andros, Tinos and Mykonos and Apostolic Administrator of the Diocese of Chios. He was appointed to these positions by Pope Francis on 25 January 2021, succeeding Nikolaos Printezis.

== Early life and education ==
Printezis was born on 6 February 1970 in Ermoupoli, on the island of Syros, Greece, to Antonios and Maria Printezis. He grew up in the villages of Vissas and Poseidonia, where he completed his primary education. He subsequently attended the First Gymnasium and First Lyceum of Syros.

At the age of 17, he moved to Boston, United States, to study at Saint John's Seminary. In 1991, he graduated with honours from the college after completing a dissertation on Plato's maieutics. In 1995, he obtained a master's degree in theology, specialising in canon law.

== Priesthood ==
Printezis was ordained a priest on 15 July 1995 by Bishop Frangkiskos Papamanolis at the Church of the Annunciation of the Virgin Mary in Syros.

Following his ordination, he served in several parishes on Syros. From 1995 to 1999, he worked in the parish of Pagos, and subsequently served in Danakos until 2016. Between 1999 and 2004, he was parish priest of Saint George's Church in Ano Syros, and from 2004 to 2016 he served at the parish of Vari. He also served at the parish of Vissas between 2014 and 2016. From 2016 to 2021, he was responsible for the parishes of the Cathedral of Saint George and the Church of Saint Sebastian in Syros. In 2017, he was appointed parish priest of the Cathedral of Syros.

In addition to his parish responsibilities, Printezis served as secretary of the Diocese of Syros until 2006, having been appointed by Bishop Frangkiskos Papamanolis. He was involved in youth ministry and the preparation of couples for marriage, and was a member of the diocesan committee for divine worship.

Since 1997, he has served as a judge of the Second Instance Ecclesiastical Tribunal of Greece. From 2001, he also worked as a religious education teacher in public schools, teaching at primary and secondary levels, including vocational and general lyceums. In 2014, he became a member of the Synodal Committee for the Family and the Protection of Life. In 2019, he was appointed president of the Synodal Committee for Divine Worship.

== Episcopal ministry ==
=== Archbishop of Naxos, Andros, Tinos and Mykonos ===
On 25 January 2021, Pope Francis accepted the resignation of Archbishop Nikolaos Printezis and appointed Josif Printezis as Metropolitan Archbishop of Naxos, Andros, Tinos and Mykonos. He was also appointed Apostolic Administrator of the Diocese of Chios. At the time of his appointment, he was serving as parish priest of the Cathedral of Syros.

The appointment was announced by the Holy See and subsequently publicised by the Catholic Archdiocese of Naxos, Tinos, Andros and Mykonos. The announcement attracted coverage from the Athens-Macedonian News Agency, which reported that Printezis was selected to succeed his namesake, Nikolaos Printezis, who had submitted his resignation upon reaching the canonical retirement age.

His episcopal consecration took place on 23 May 2021 at the Cathedral of Our Lady of the Rosary in Xinara, on the island of Tinos. The principal consecrator was Archbishop Nikolaos Printezis, with Archbishop Sevastianos Rossolatos and Bishop Petros Stefanou serving as principal co-consecrators.
