= List of Greek popes =

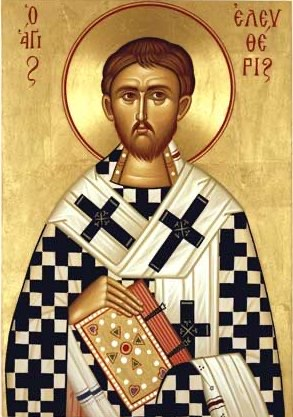
Icon of Pope Saint Eleutherius (r. c. 174 – 189), the third pope of Greek descent

Beginning with Pope Telesphorus (r. c. 126 – c. 137) and ending with Pope Zachary (r. 741–752), there have been twelve bishops of Rome who were of Greek descent. Most were pope before or during the Byzantine Papacy (537–752), a period when the pope was required to be approved by the Byzantine emperor prior to his episcopal consecration. This list does not include all the Sicilian and Syrian popes of Greek extraction from that period.

Of the twelve Greek popes, seven have been canonised as saints.

== Pre-537 ==
- Telesphorus (r. c. 126 – c. 137; canonised)
- Hyginus (r. c. 138 – c. 142; canonised)
- Eleutherius (r. c. 174 – 189; canonised)
- Anterus (r. 235–236; canonised)
- Stephen I (r. 254–257; canonised)
- Sixtus II (r. 257–258; canonised)
- Zosimus (r. 417–418; canonised)

== 537–753 ==
- Theodore I (r. 642–649)
- Conon (r. 686–687)
- John VI (r. 701–705)
- John VII (r. 705–707)
- Zachary (r. 741–752; canonised)

== See also ==
- List of popes by nationality
