= Catholic Church in Greece =

- Greek: Καθολική Εκκλησία στην Ελλάδα
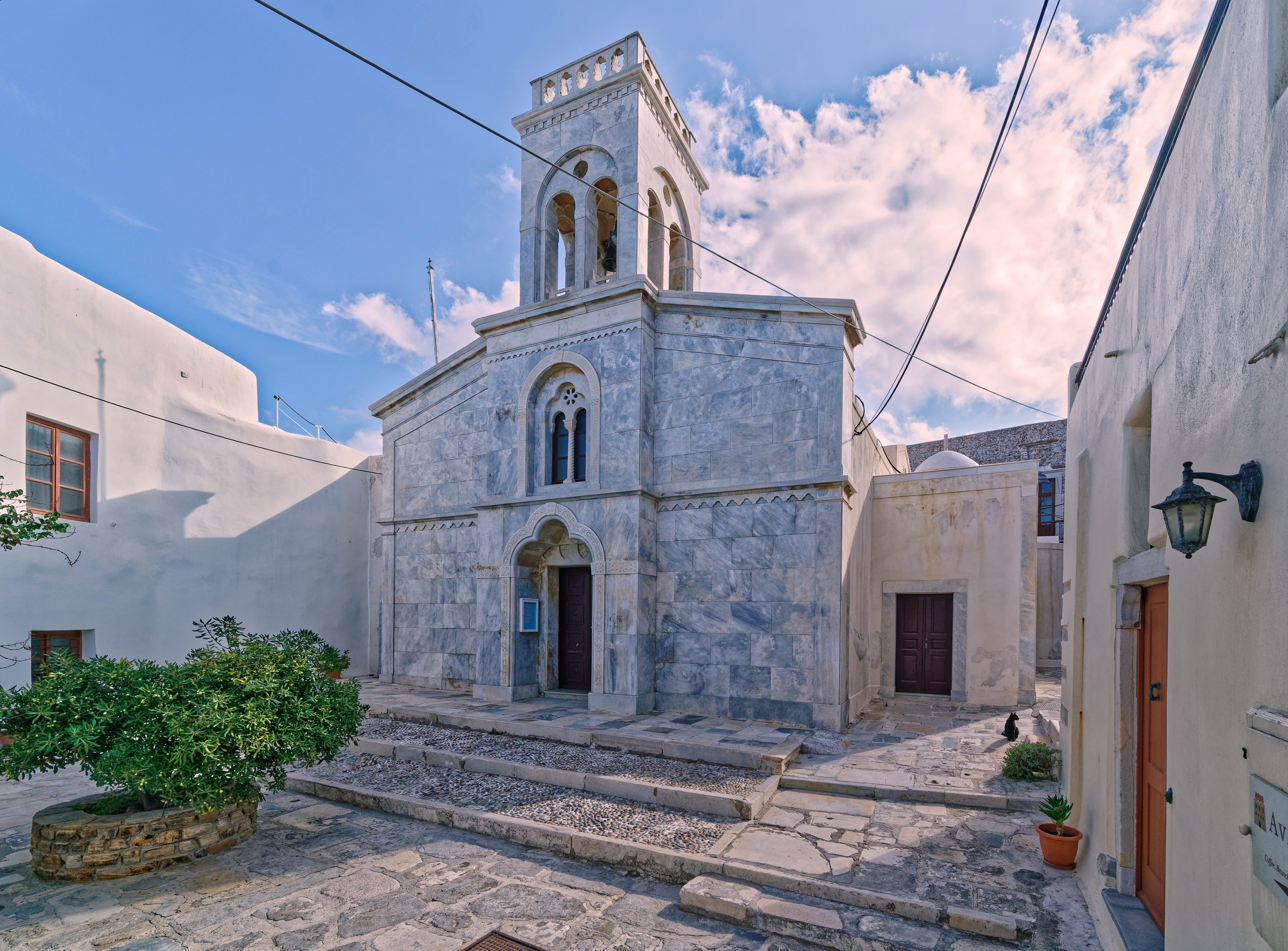
- Catholic medieval Church of Presentation of the Lord, Naxos
- Type: National polity
- Classification: Catholic
- Governance: Catholic Bishops' Conference of Greece
- Pope: Leo XIV
- Apostolic Nuncio: Savio Hon
- Region: Greece
- Language: Latin; Greek
- Headquarters: Athens
- Founder: Apostles Andrew and Paul
- Origin: 1st century

The Catholic Church in Greece is part of the worldwide Catholic Church, under the spiritual leadership of the Pope in Rome. Indigenous Roman Catholic Greeks numbered about 50,000–70,000 in 2022 and were a religious and not an ethnic minority. Most of them are a remnant of Venetian and Genoese rule in southern Greece and many Greek islands (in both the Aegean and Ionian seas) from the early 13th until the late 18th century, Greeks who converted to Catholicism or descendants of the thousands of Bavarians that came to Greece in the 1830s as soldiers and civil administrators, accompanying King Otto. One very old but still common term to reference to them is Φράγκοι, or "Franks", dating to the times of the Byzantine Empire, when medieval Greeks would use that term to describe all Catholics. In addition to that, the derogatory term Papist is used by some Orthodox to describe Catholics.

Since the early 1990s, however, the number of Catholic permanent residents of Greece has greatly increased; as of 2002, they numbered 200,000 at the very least, and probably more. These Catholics are immigrants from Eastern Europe (especially Poland) or from the Philippines, but also include Western European immigrants that live permanently in Athens, Thessaloniki or the Greek islands (especially Crete, Syros, Rhodes and Corfu).

Today, the majority of Catholics live in Athens, a city of about four million people; the rest of them can be found all over Greece. Most indigenous Catholics live in the islands, and especially the Cyclades, where Syros and Tinos in particular have some entirely Catholic villages and parishes. Catholics can be found also in Corfu, Naxos, Santorini, Kefalonia, Zakynthos, Rhodes, Kos, Crete, Samos, Lesbos and Chios. In the mainland, Catholic communities are smaller, and include those of Patras (a city that was home to a large Italian community until World War II), Thessaloniki, Kavala, Volos etc. In addition to Latin-rite Catholics who represent the vast majority of the faithful, there were about 5,000 members of the Greek Byzantine Catholic Church and a few hundred Armenian Catholics in 2002.

The Catholic Church itself states that "the total population of Catholics in Greece exceeds 350,000". Other estimates suggested that there were 133,000 Catholics in Greece (1.22% of the population) in 2020.

The Catholic Church is recognised by the Greek government and Catholic schools operate in the country.

== History ==
Before the division of the church in 1054, there were structures of the Catholic Church in Greece. Since the 5th century, the Roman Catholic archbishop of Thessalonica led the Illyrian Vicariate of the Latin Church. Until 1054, there was mutual recognition between the Latin and Byzantine communities in Greece.

After the separation of churches in 1054, a split occurred between these communities. After the church split and the conquest of Greece by the Ottoman Empire, the Greek Catholics began to be called "Franks" (Greek Φράγκοι). This name of local Catholics came from the faith professed by the Franks. Orthodox Greeks, distinguishing themselves from the Franks, called themselves the "Romans" (Greek Ρωμαίοι), identifying themselves with the Byzantine Empire, which considered itself the successor to the Roman Empire.

After the Fourth Crusade in 1204, the residence of the Latin patriarch with 12 dioceses subordinate to him was established in Constantinople. In 1205, Pope Innocent III established the Latin Archdiocese in Athens. Other Latin church structures were established at the same time. In Greece, various Western monastic orders also operated.

After the conquest of Byzantium by the Ottoman Empire in 1453 in Greece, the activity of the Latin structures gradually ceased and the dioceses of the Latin rite became titular. At the same time, until the 18th century, there were numerous Venetian colonies in Greece, which possessed considerable freedom.

In 1830, a gradual restoration of Church hierarchy began in Greece. That year, Pope Gregory XVI established the first Catholic Church hierarchy, which was called the apostolic delegate. In 1834, Bishop Blancis was appointed apostolic delegate and the Holy See entrusted him with the care of Roman Catholics living in Greece. On 23 July 1875 Pope Pius IX established the archdiocese of Athens and the Peloponnese.

In 1856, a community of Greek Eastern Catholics was formed in Constantinople, which became the basis of the Greek Byzantine Catholic Church.

Since 1968, for the sake of Christian unity, the Catholic Church of Greece reckons Easter according to the Julian calendar, making it coincide every year with the Orthodox celebration of Pascha.

In 1979, the Holy See established diplomatic relations with Greece.

== Popes from Greece ==
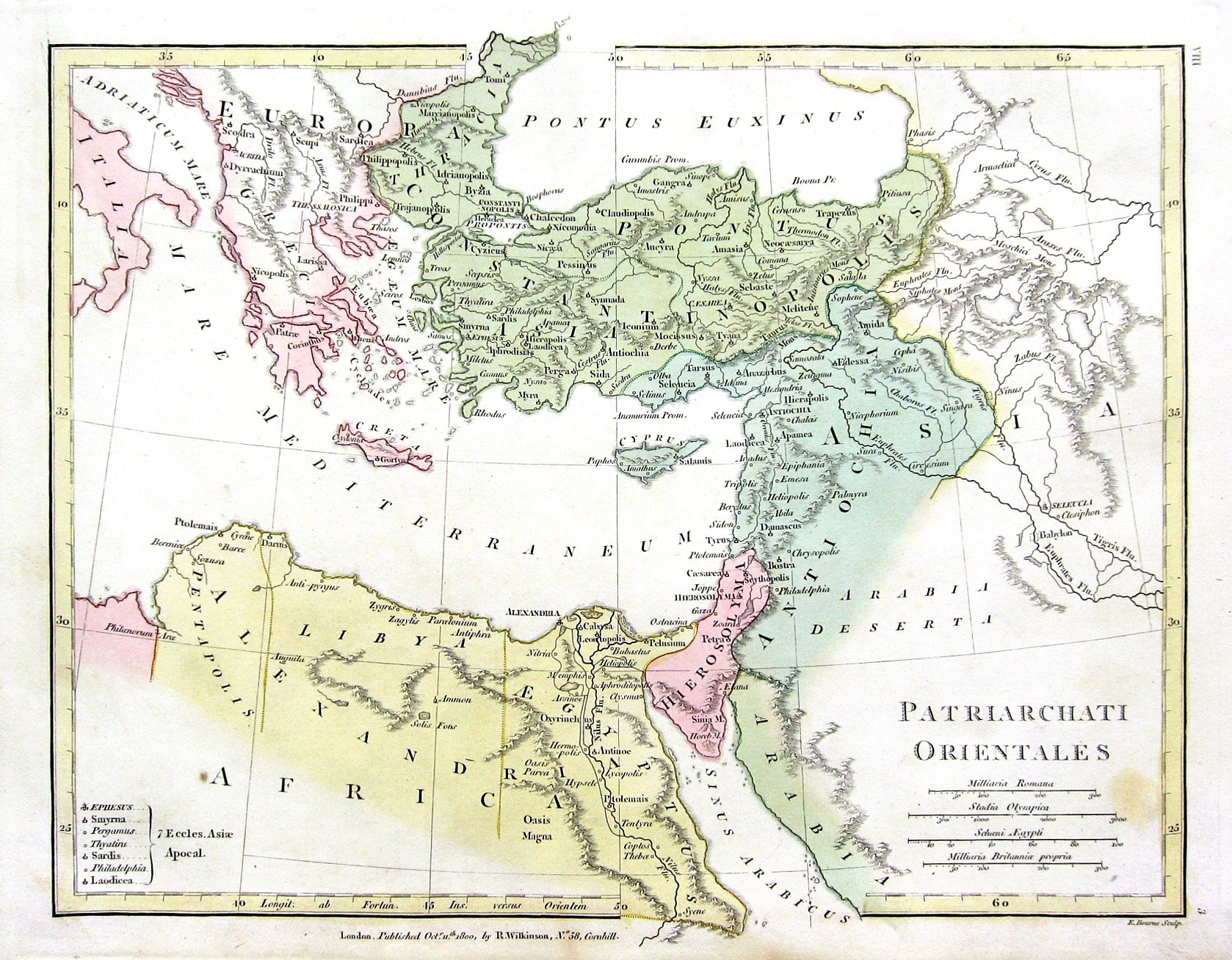
A map of Emperor Justinian's Pentarchy. Almost all of modern Greece was under the jurisdiction of the Holy See of Rome. Emperor Leo III moved the border of the Patriarchate of Constantinople westward and northward in the 8th century.

- Pope Constantine
- Pope Hyginus
- Pope Eleutherius
- Pope Sixtus II

== Bishops' Conference ==
The Bishops' Conference of Greece (Hiera Synodos Katholikis Hierarkhias Hellados) has six members:

- The archbishop of Corfu and apostolic administrator of Thessaloniki
- The archbishop of Naxos and Tinos and apostolic administrator of Chios
- The archbishop of Athens and apostolic administrator of Rhodes
- The bishop of Syros and Santorini and apostolic administrator of Crete
- The exarch of the Greek Catholics of Byzantine Rite (based in Athens)
- The ordinary of the Armenian Catholics (based in Athens)

== Papal representatives to Greece ==
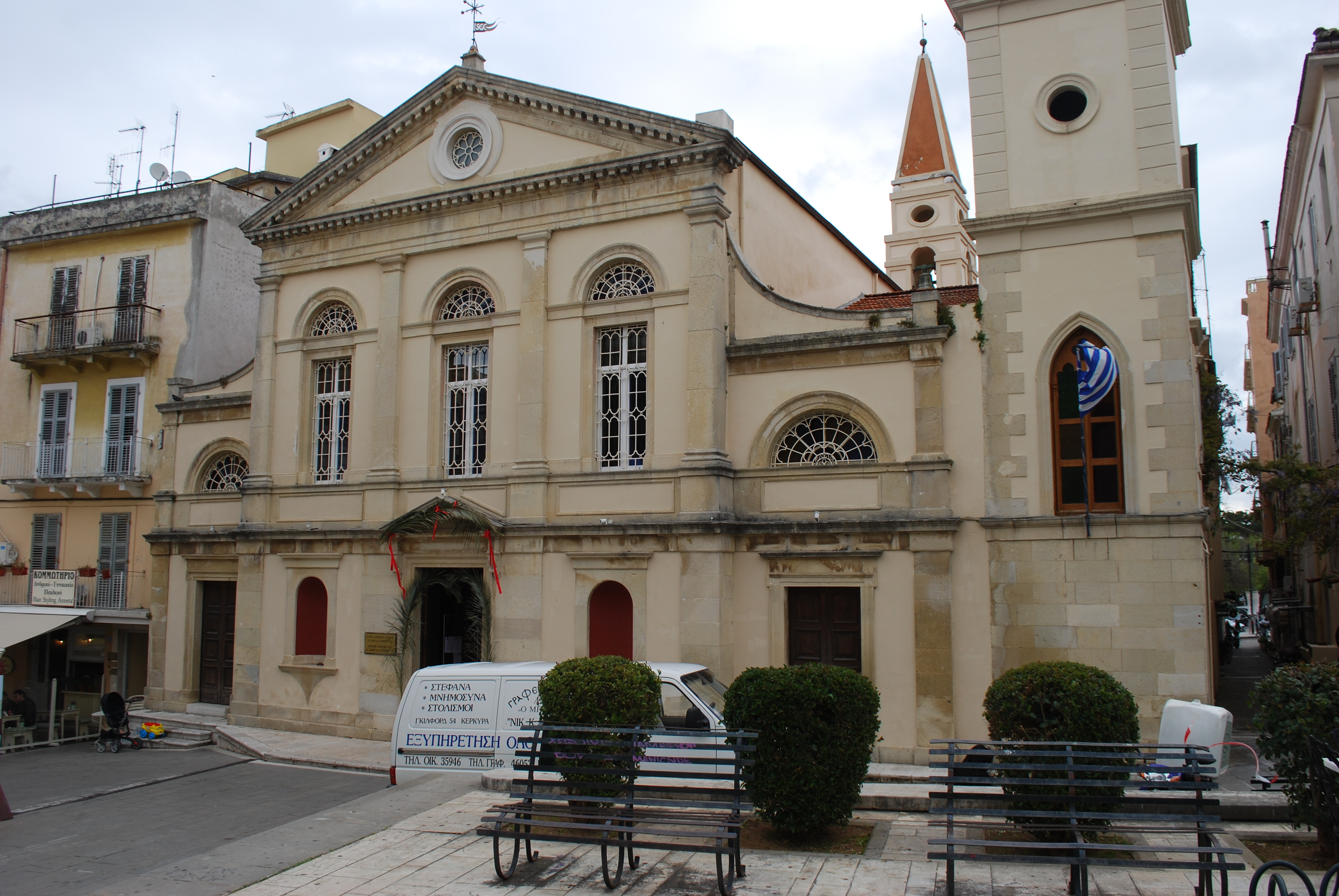
Cathedral of Saint James and Saint Christopher in Corfu

== Organization ==
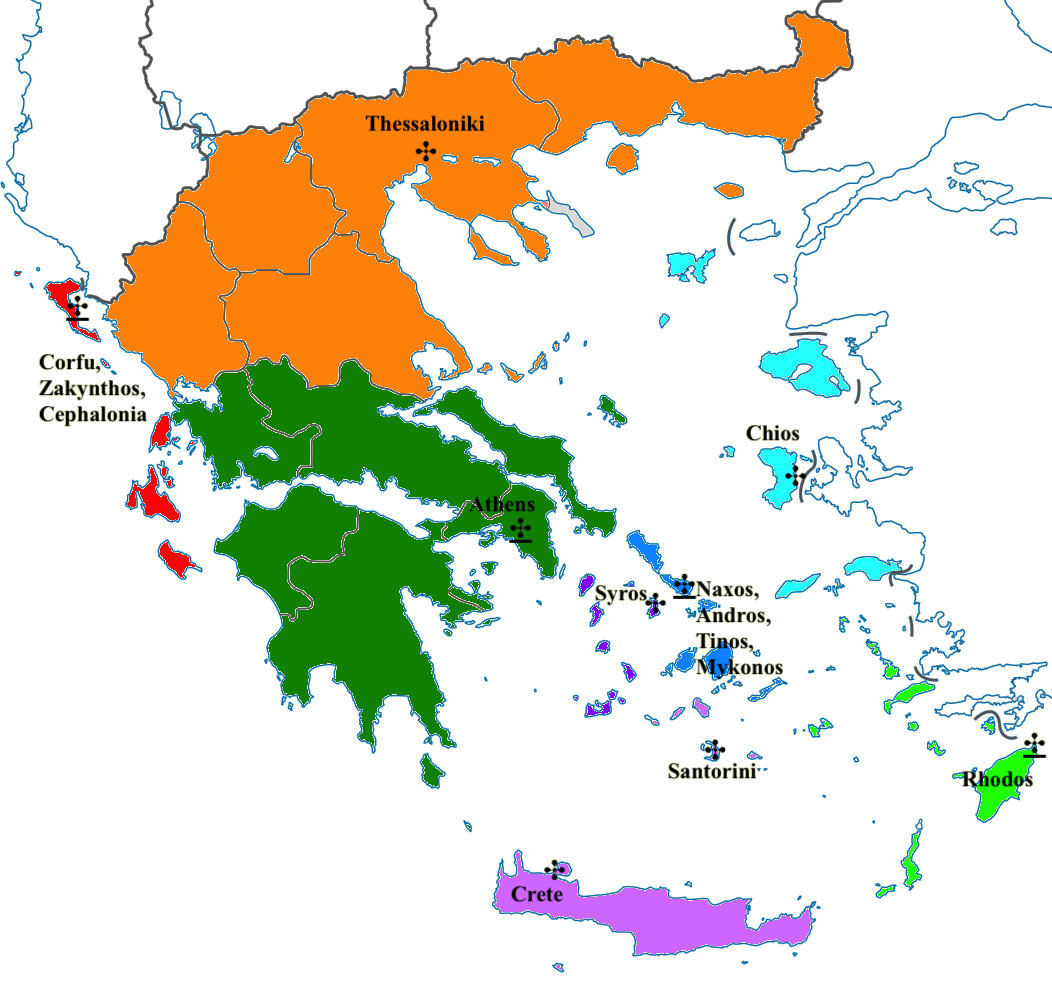
Catholic Dioceses in Greece

=== Latin Catholic ===
- Archdiocese of Athens
- Archdiocese of Rhodos
- Archdiocese of Corfù, Zante and Cefalonia
- Archdiocese of Naxos, Andros, Tinos and Mykonos
  - Diocese of Chios
  - Diocese of Crete
  - Diocese of Santorini
  - Diocese of Syros and Milos
- Apostolic Vicariate of Thessaloniki

==== Dioceses ====
- Catholic Archdiocese of Corfu
- Catholic Archdiocese of Rhodes
- Catholic Archdiocese of Naxos - Tinos
- Greek (Byzantine) Catholic Exarchate

==== Parishes ====
- Catholic parish of Heraklion
- Catholic parish of Kavala
- Catholic parish of Patras
- Catholic parish of Thessaloniki
- German-speaking Catholic community in Greece
- Polish Catholic community in Greece

=== Others ===
- Caritas Hellas
- Jesuit Community in Greece

== Notable Greek Catholics ==
- Demetrios Kydones, theologian
- Ioannis Kyparissiotes, theologian
- Constantine Palaiologos, Last Byzantine emperor.
- Thomas Palaiologos, Despot of Morea
- Andreas Palaiologos, Despot of Morea
- Basilius Bessarion, scholar, theologian and cardinal
- Ioannis Argyropoulos, scholar
- Ioannis Kottounios, scholar
- Marcus Musurus, scholar
- Leo Allatius, scholar
- Francisco Leontaritis, composer
- Vincenzos Cornaros, poet, playwright
- Lorentzos Mavilis, poet and martyr
- Ioannis Andreas Kargas, bishop of Syros
- Dominikos Theotokopoulos ("El Greco"), painter
- Constantine Gerachis (Phaulkon), adventurer
- Ioannis Marangos, archbishop
- Markos Vamvakaris, musician
- Antonis Delatolas, publisher of To Pontiki
- Maria Korinthiou, actress

== Gallery ==
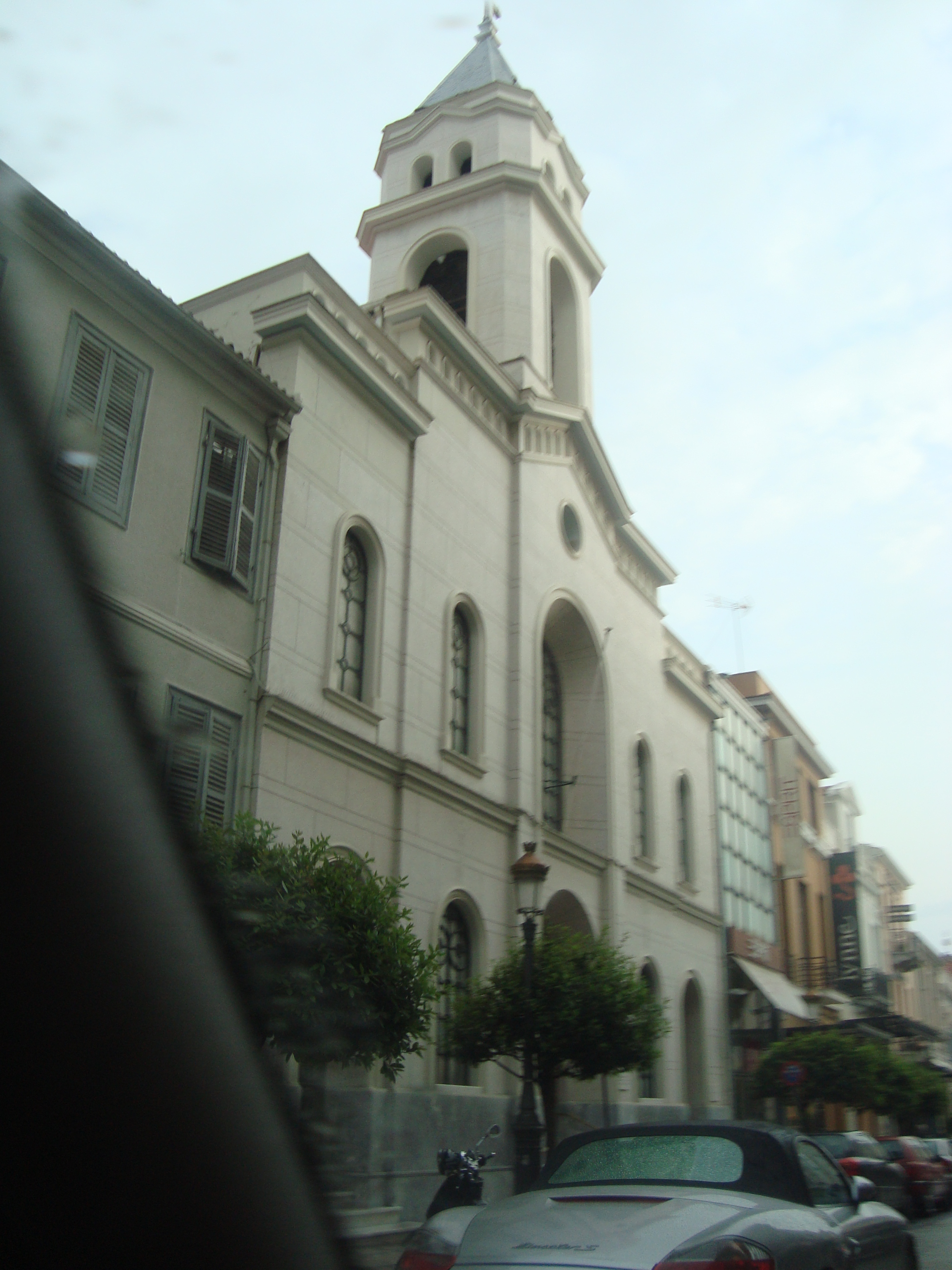
St. Andrew in Patras

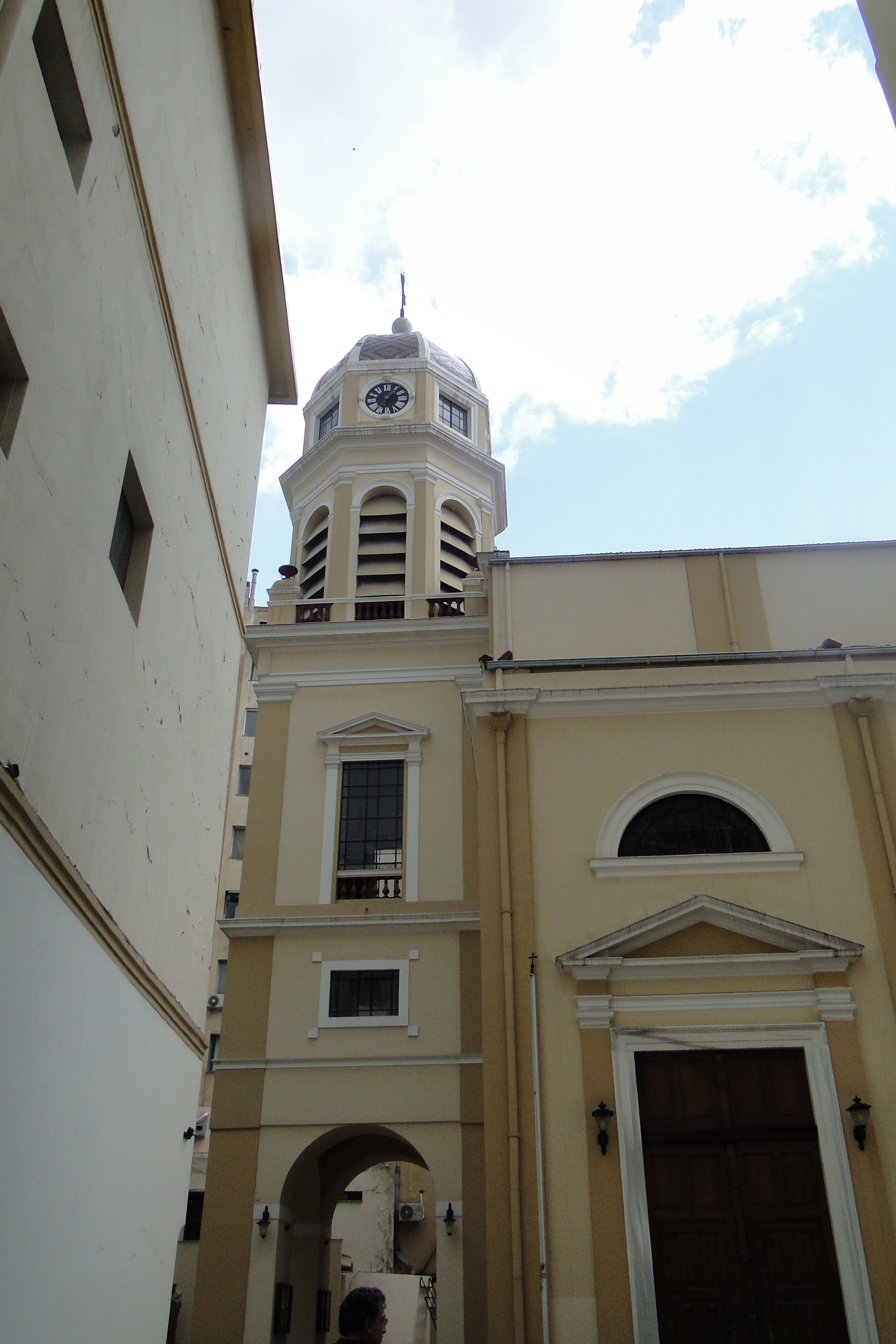
Immaculate Conception Cathedral, Thessaloniki

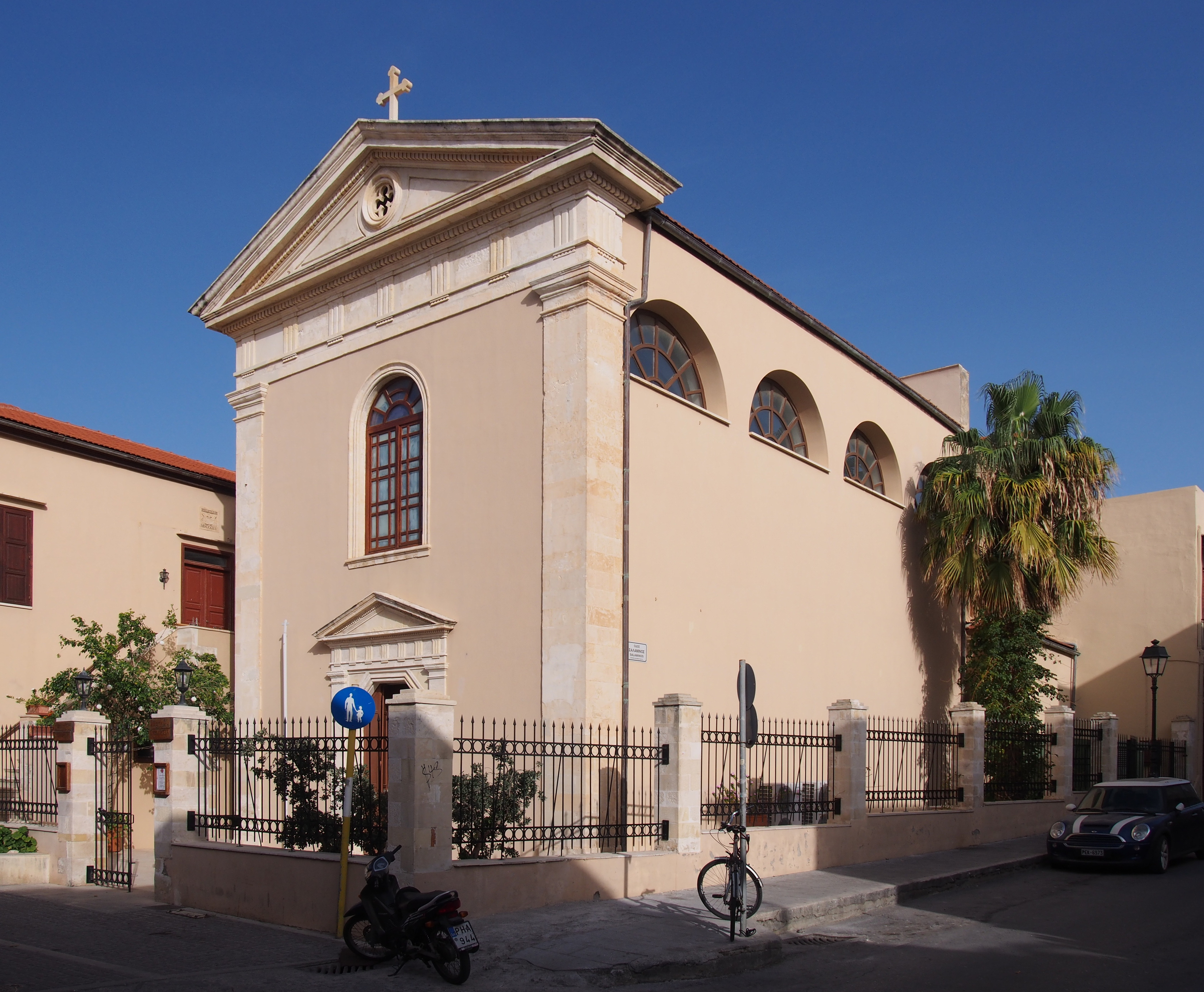
St. Antonios, Rethymno

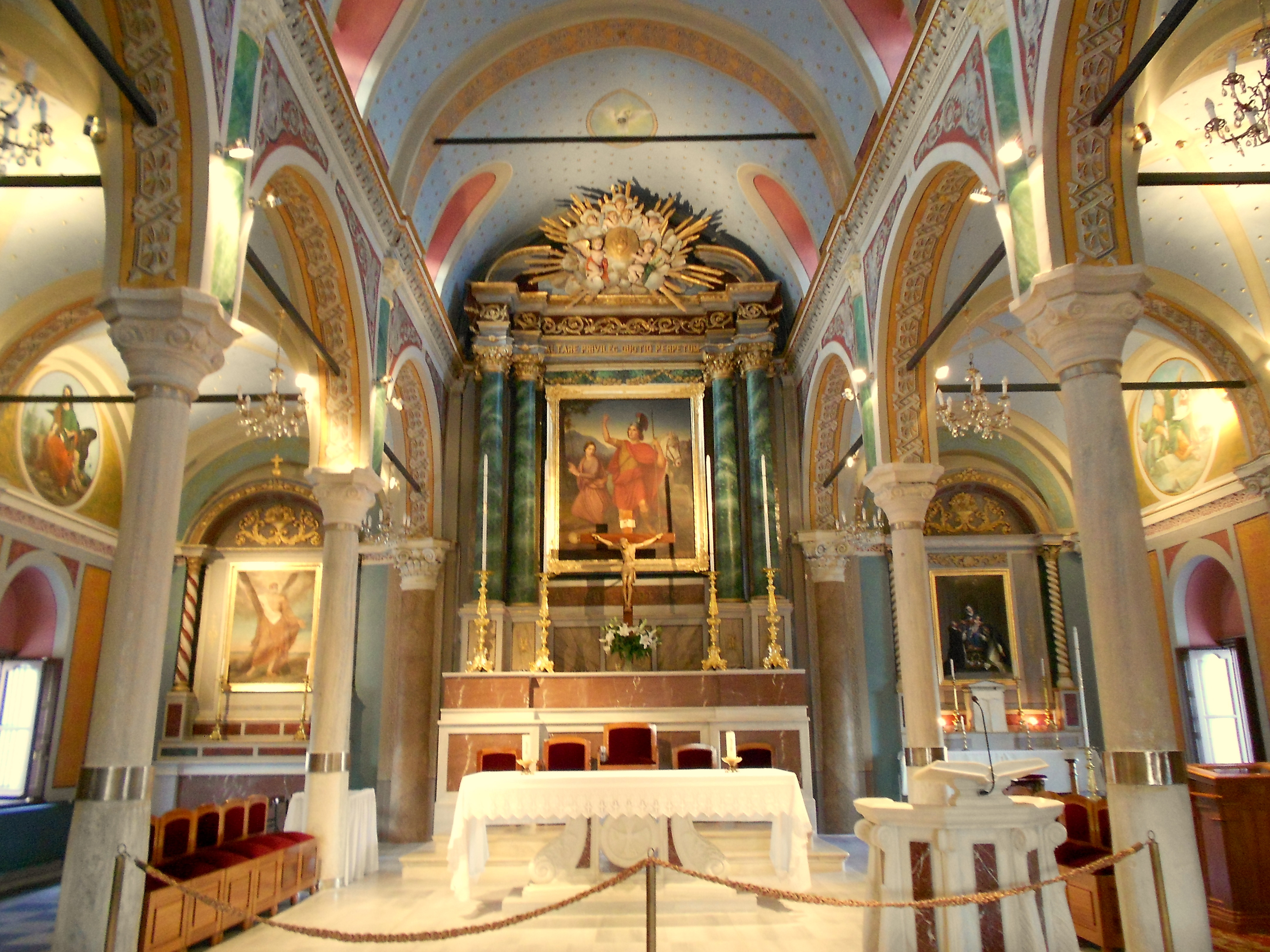
Saint George's Cathedral, Syros

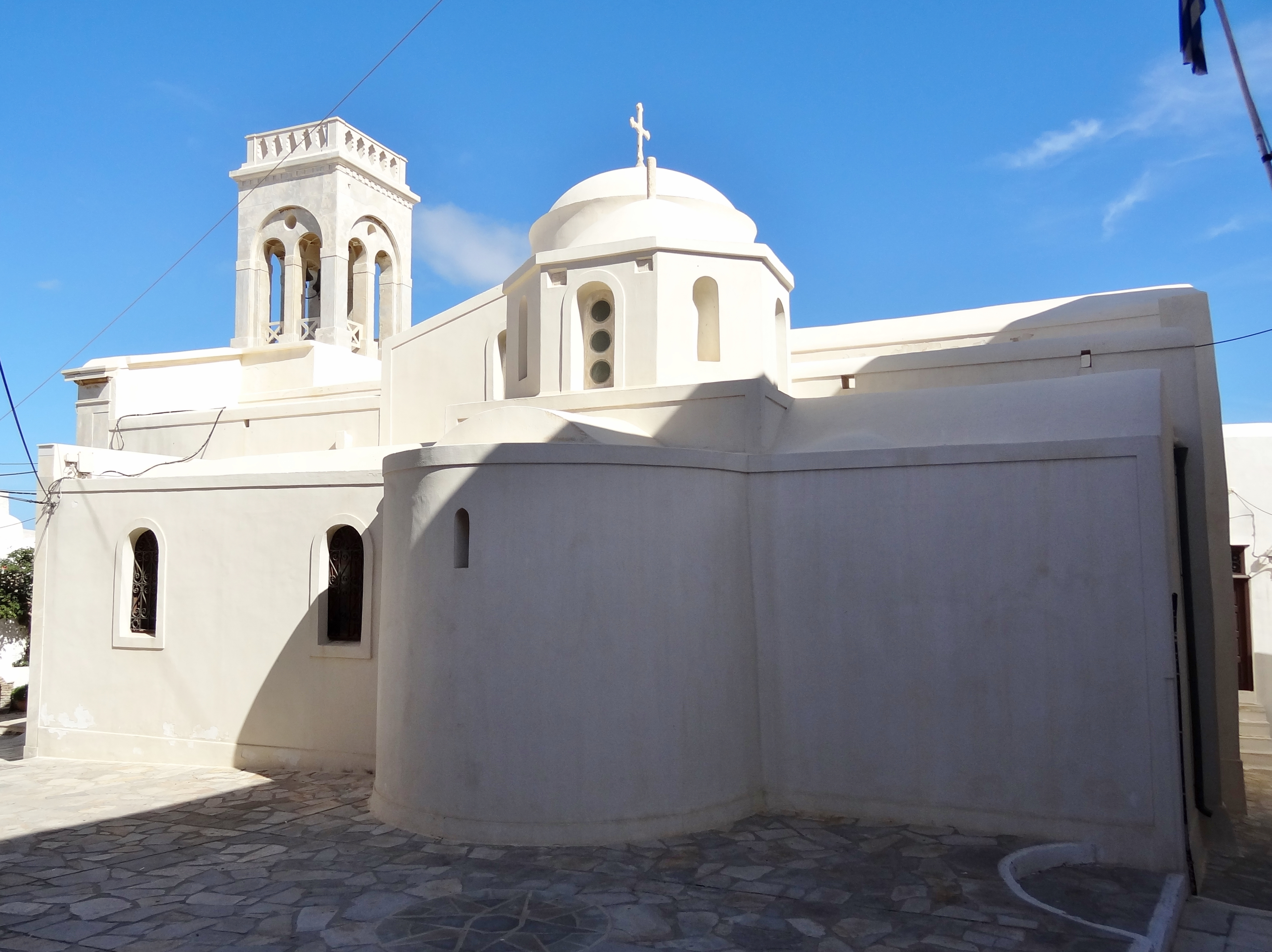
Church of Presentation of the Lord in Naxos

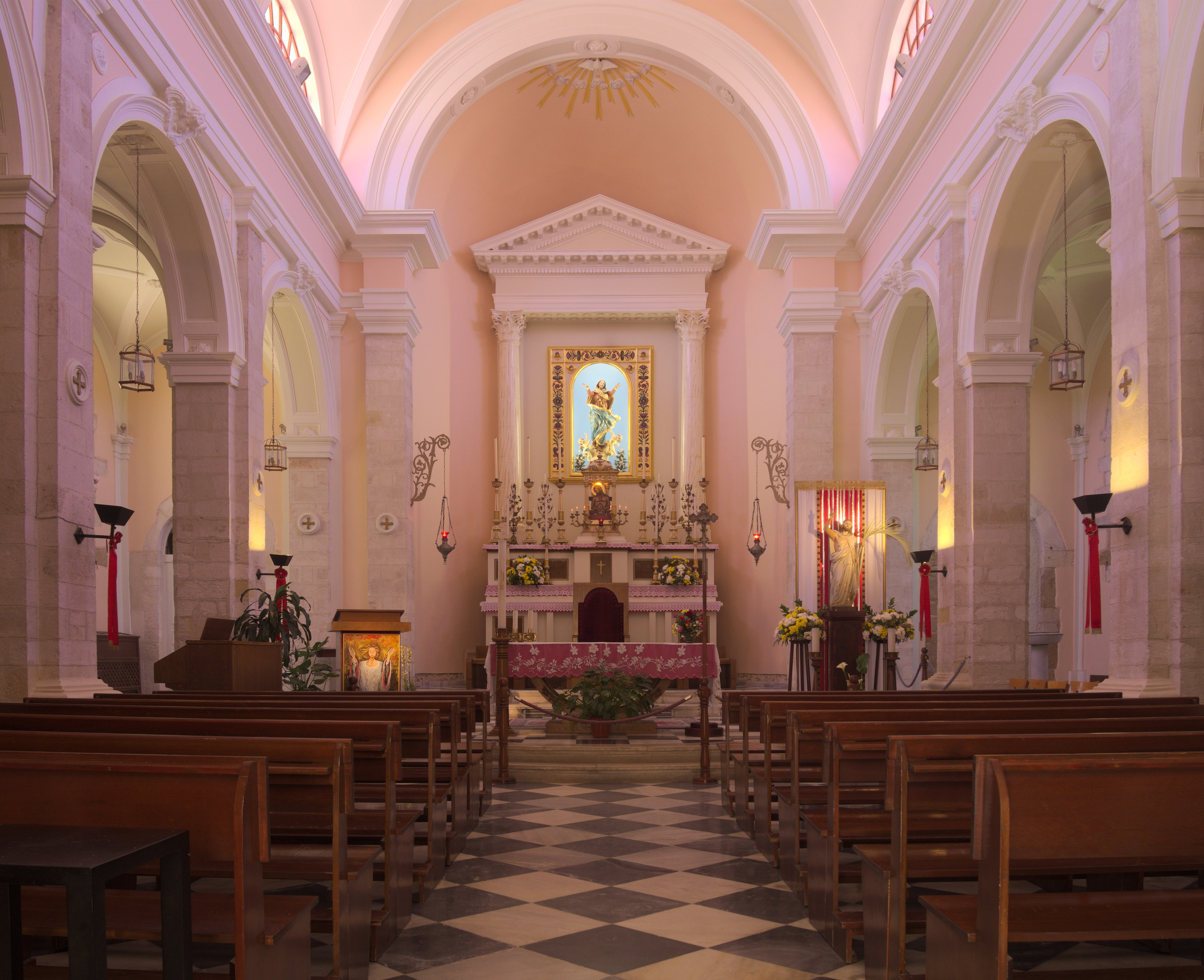
Assumption Cathedral, Chania (Capuchin)

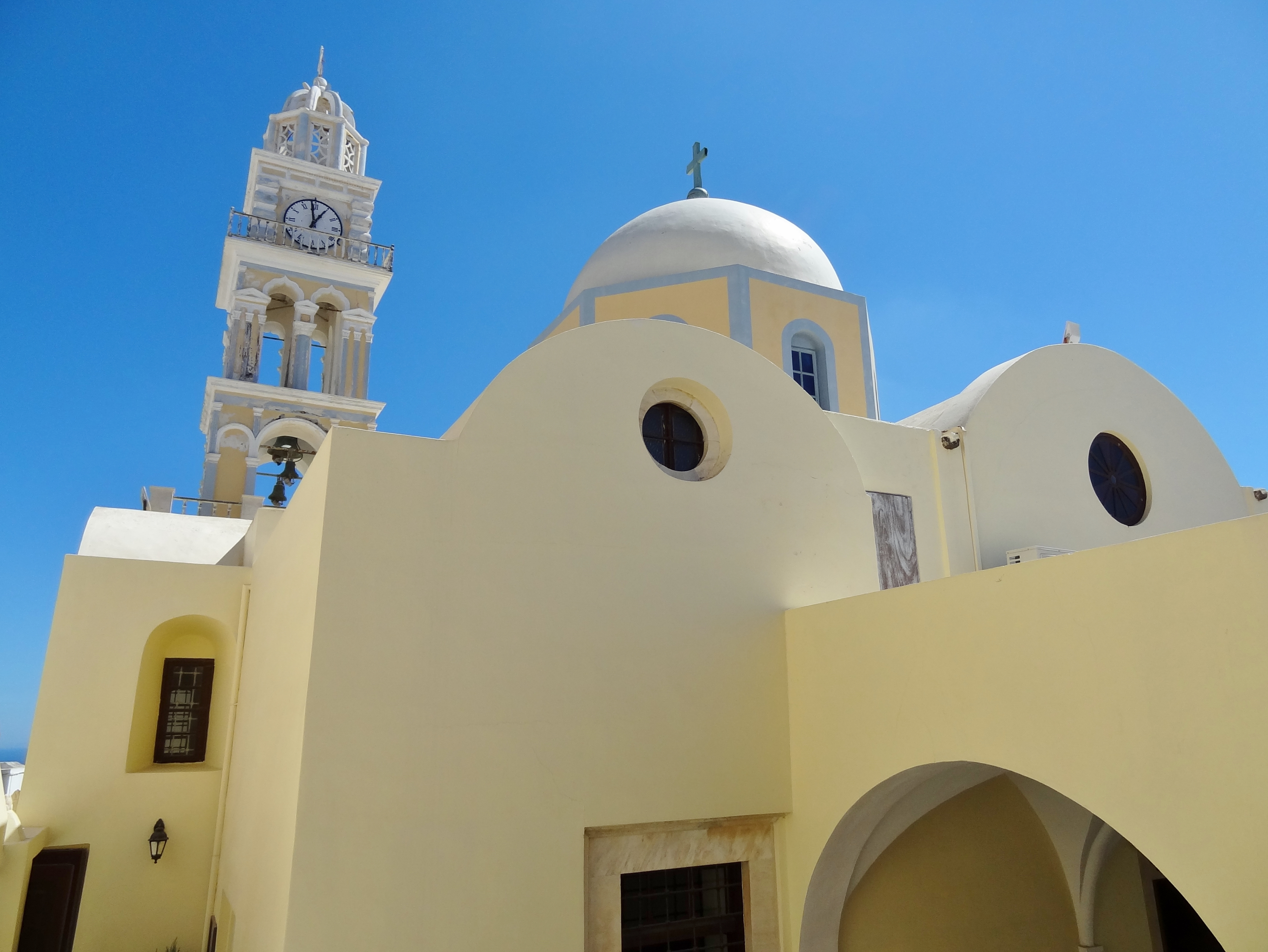
Cathedral of Saint John the Baptist in Fira

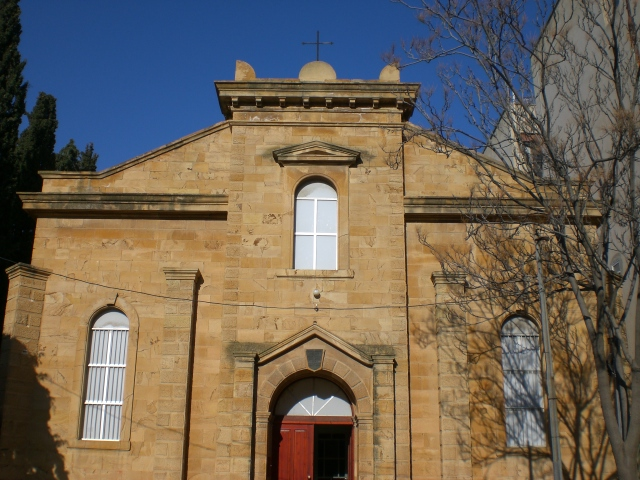
St. Joseph, Alexandroupoli

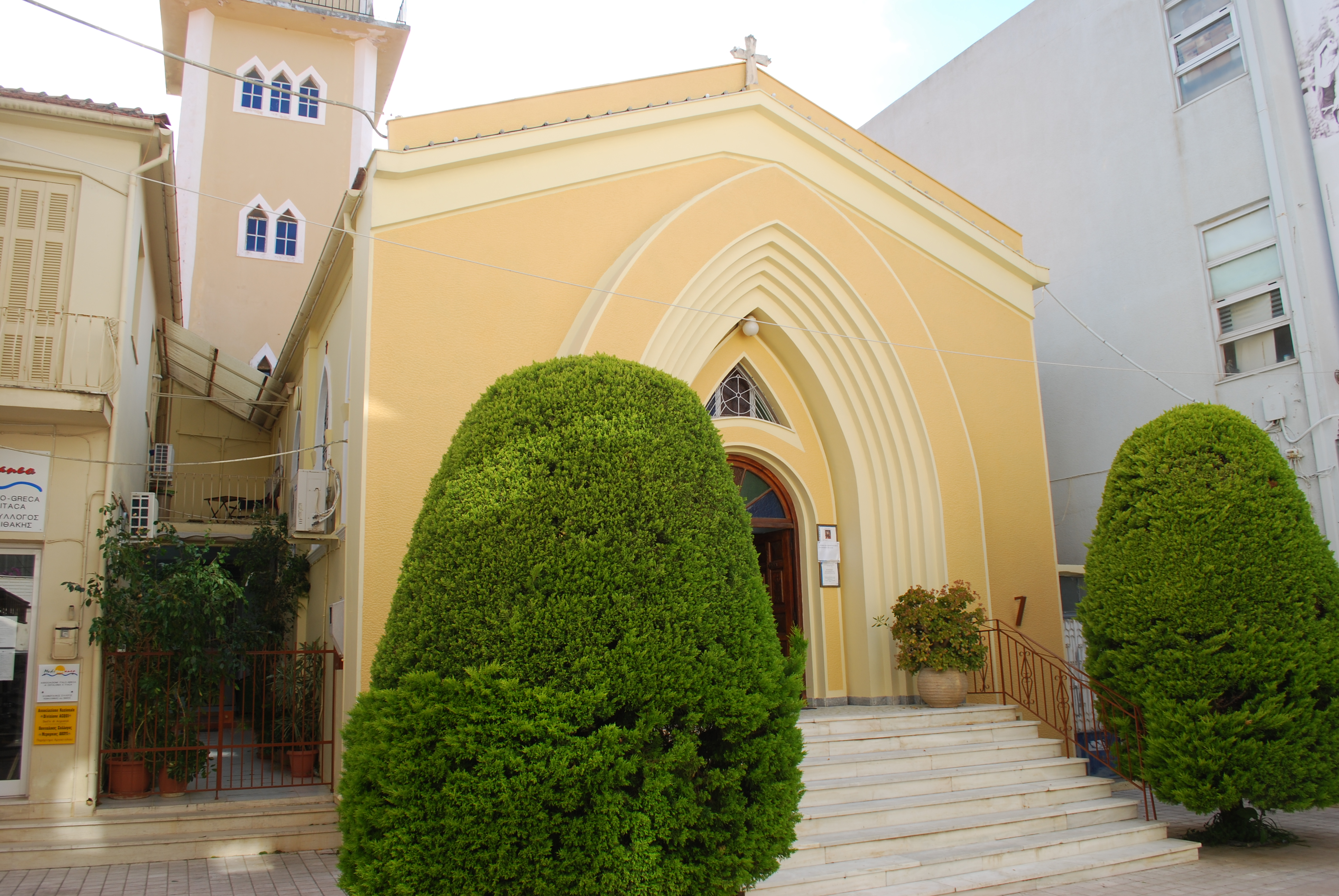
St. Nicolaus in Argostoli

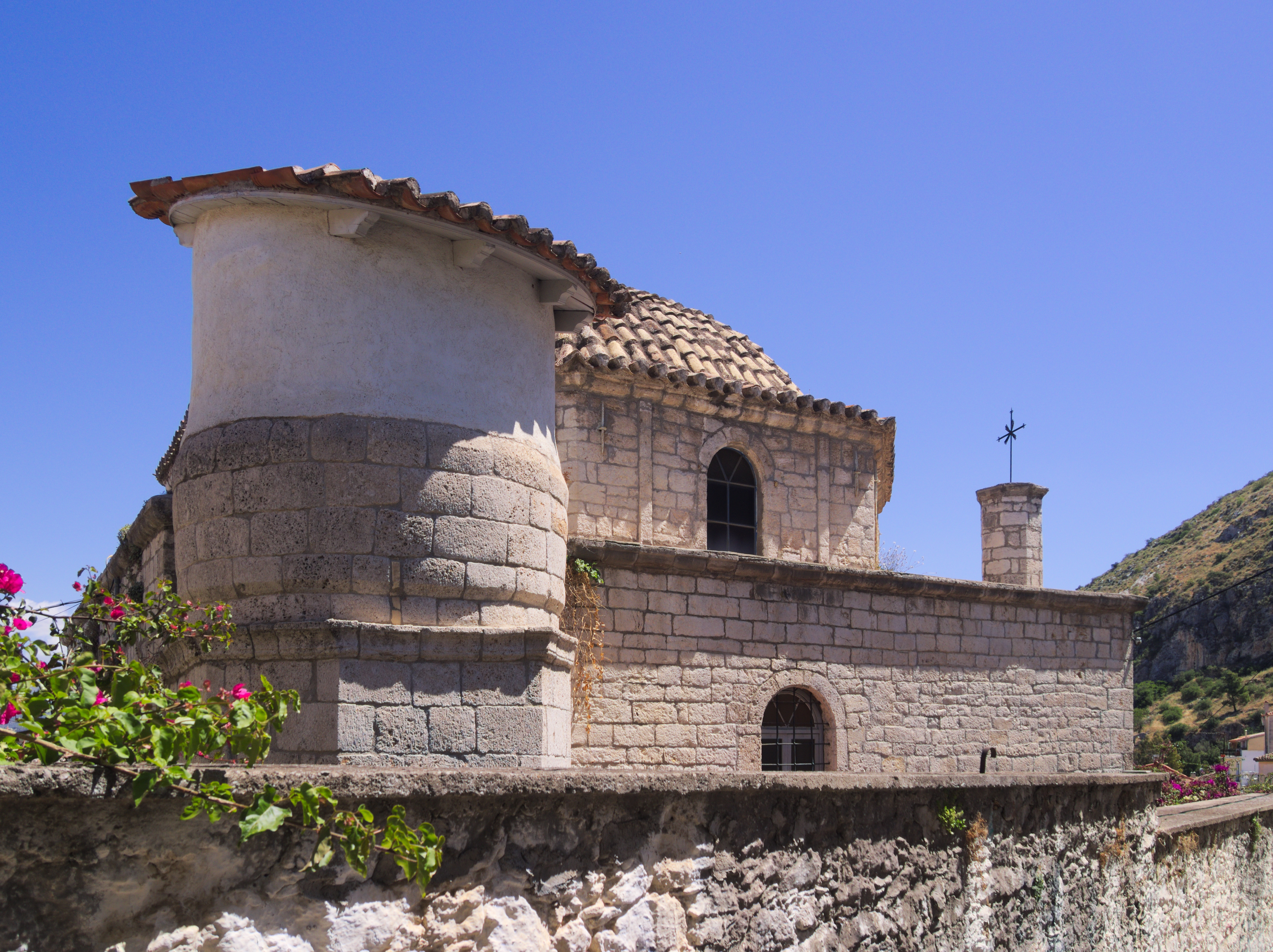
Metamorphosis church in Nafplio

== See also ==
- Greek Byzantine Catholic Church
- List of Greek popes
- Religion in Greece
- Greek Orthodox Church
