= Archdiocese of Naxos, Tinos, Andros and Mykonos =

Roman Catholic archdiocese in Greece

Coordinates: 37.5756°N 25.1635°E

Archdiocese of Naxos, Tinos, Andros, and Mykonos Archidioecesis Naxiensis, Andrensis, Tinensis, et Myconensis Αρχιεπισκοπή Νάξου, Τήνου, Άνδρου και Μυκόνου

Catholic

Location
- Country: Greece

Statistics
- Area: 1,377 km^{2} (532 sq mi)
- Population: Total; Catholics: (as of 2013); 61,900; 5,400 (8.7%)

Information
- Sui iuris church: Latin Church
- Rite: Roman Rite
- Established: 13th Century (As Diocese of Naxos); 1522 (As Archdiocese of Naxos); 3 June 1919 (As Archdiocese of Naxos, Andros, Tinos and Mykonos)
- Cathedral: Cathedral of Our Lady of Rosary in Tinos

Current leadership
- Pope: Leo XIV
- Bishop: Josif Printezis
- Bishops emeritus: Nikolaos Printezis

Website
- http://kantam.gr/

The Archdiocese of Naxos, Tinos, Andros, and Mykonos (Latin: Archidioecesis Naxiensis, Andrensis, Tinensis, et Myconensis) is a Latin Church archdiocese of the Catholic church in insular Greece.

Its cathedral archiepiscopal see is the cathedral of Our Lady of the Rosary, in the village of Xinara, on Tinos, and also has a Co-Cathedral of the Presentation of the Lord, in Naxos town.

The ecclesiastical territory comprises most of the Aegean islands in Greece, including, but not limited to Naxos, Andros, Tinos and Mykonos.

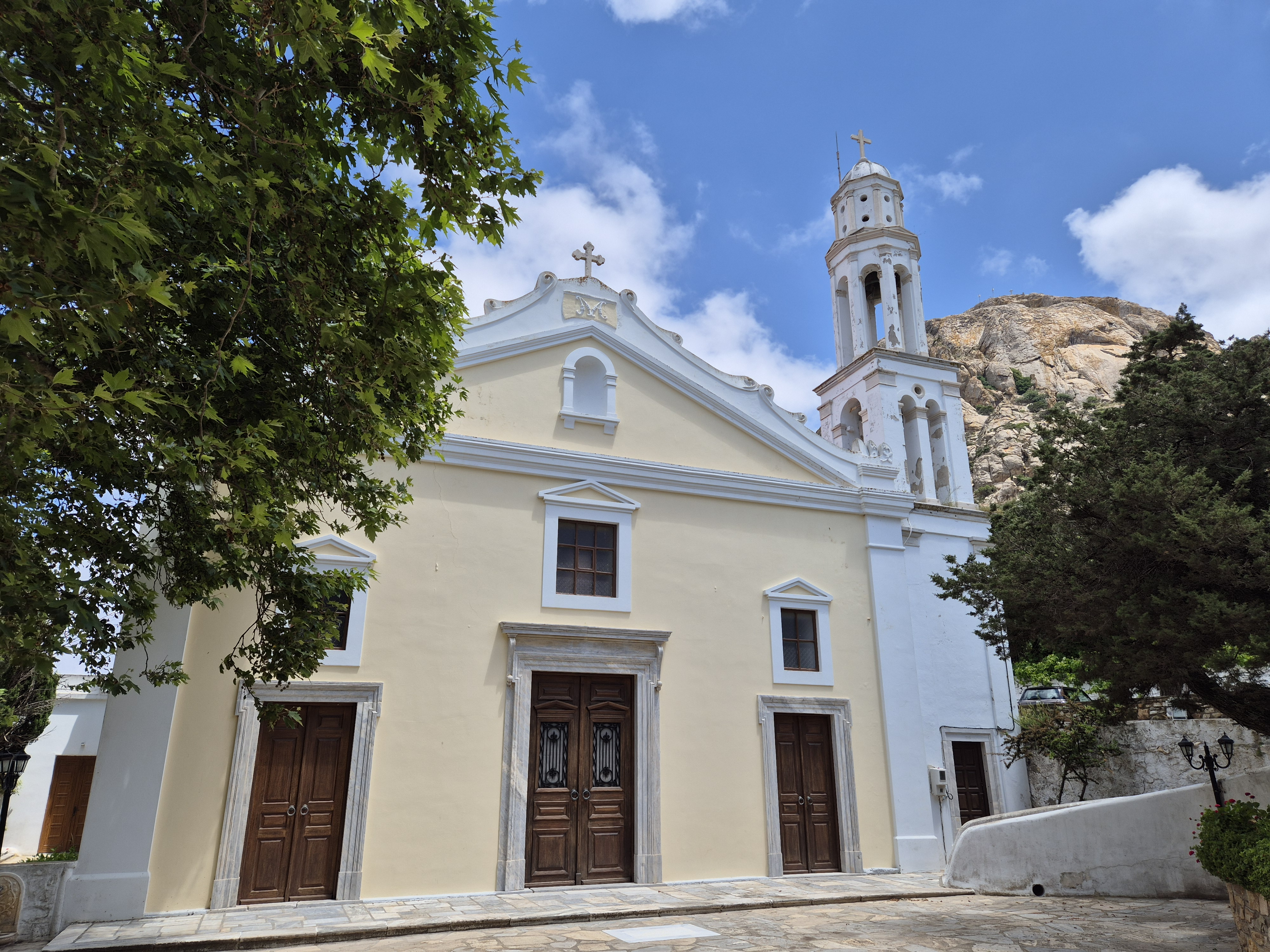
The cathedral of the Roman Catholic archdiocese of Naxos-Tinos, Greece

== History ==
Originally erected as the Diocese of Naxos in the 13th century, the Latin bishopric was promoted to the rank of Metropolitan Archdiocese of Naxos in 1522, after the fall of Rhodes (Ottoman conquest), when the Archiepiscopal see for its Knights Hospitallers' crusader state was in fact moved from there.

In 1538, Naxos (along with the islands of Andros, Paros, and Santorini) fell to the Ottoman naval commander Hayreddin Barbarossa. In response, Pope Paul III assembled a ’’Holy League’’, comprising the Papacy, Spain, the Republic of Genoa, the Republic of Venice and the Knights of Malta, to confront Barbarossa but were defeated at the Battle of Preveza.

On June 3, 1919, the Archdiocese of Naxos was united with the Roman Catholic Archdiocese of Tinos and Mykonos (which in 1824 had absorbed the suppressed Roman Catholic Diocese of Andros, without adopting its title) to form the present Archdiocese of Naxos, Tinos, Andros and Mykonos, whose new name also includes Andros.

In 1964, the parish charitable funds and the various Catholic associations and brotherhoods of the diocese were brought together in a single organisation, as an attempt to unify the efforts. This organisation had the name To spíti tou ftochoú (Το σπίτι του φτωχού; "The Poor Man's House") and helped families through donations and loans, promoting education, and supporting the disabled, widows, and orphans. It was renamed Caritas Naxos-Tinos (Κάριτας Νάξου – Τήνου) in the 1980s and expanded its goals, and became a member of Caritas Hellas in 1981. In 1994, it was registered as an NGO. Caritas Naxos-Tinos is the official social arm of the Roman Catholic Archdiocese of Naxos, Tinos, Andros and Mykonos.

== Province ==
The Metropolitan's ecclesiastical province comprises his own archdiocese and the following suffragan dioceses :

- Roman Catholic Diocese of Chios
- Roman Catholic Diocese of Crete
- Roman Catholic Diocese of Santorini
- Roman Catholic Diocese of Syros and Milos.

== Bishops ==
(all Latin Church)

=== Diocese of Naxos ===
Erected: 13th Century
Latin Name: Naxiensis

- Giorgio (1252.11.12 – ?)
- Bernardino (1330.10.19 – 1332.05.13), later Bishop of Sorres (1332.05.13 – ?)
- Daniele (? – death 1345)
- Andrea, Carmelites (O. Carm.) (1349.01.19 – 1356.05.29), later Bishop of Bosa (Italy) (1356.05.29 – 1360)
- Tommaso, Friars Minor (O.F.M.) (1357.06.30 – ?)
- Stefano (? – 1377.09.18), later (Metropolitan) Titular Archbishop of Cæsarea in Palæstina (1377.09.18 – ?)
- Pantaleo Dioscoro di Nasso [which is Italian for 'of Naxos'] (1418.05.02 – ?), previously Bishop of Syros (Greece) (1410.02.12 – 1418.05.02)
- Leonardo, Augustinian Order (O.E.S.A.) (1446.06.03 – ?)
- Francesco, O.F.M. (1453.04.30 – ?)
- Antonio (1458.12.29 – ?)
- Nicola (1460.08.22 – ?)
- Nicola di Gaeta (1479.02.13 – ?), previously Bishop of Minervino (1492.01.23 – 1497.05.15), Bishop of Acerra (Italy) (1497.05.15 – 1504.04.15)
- Roberto de Noya (Noja), O.P. (1504.04.15 – 1515 Died)
- Paolo Zabarella, O.E.S.A. (1515 – ?)
- Filippo di Vegis (1519.09.15 – 1523)

=== Archdiocese of Naxos ===
Elevated: 1522
Latin Name: Naxiensis

- Giacomo Coppi (archbishop) (1524–1538 Died)
- Giuseppe de Montanaris (1538–1540 Died)
- Sebastiano Leccavella, O.P. (1542–1562 Appointed, Bishop of Lettere-Gragnano)
- Antonio Giustiniani (archbishop of Lipari), O.P. (1562–1564 Appointed, Archbishop (Personal Title) of Lipari)
- Francesco Pisani (bishop) (1564–1569 Appointed, Bishop of Chioggia)
- Domenico di Grammatica (1579–?)
- Dionisio Reudio, O.F.M. (1593–1615 Died)
- Angelo Gozzadini (1616–1621 Appointed, Archbishop (Personal Title) of Civita Castellana e Orte)
- Marco Antonio Quirino, O.Cruc. (1622–1625 Resigned)
- Raffaele Schiattini (1625–1657 Died)
- Bartolomeo Polla (1659–1691 Died)
- Pietro Martire Giustiniani, O.P. (1691–1700 Appointed, Archbishop (Personal Title) of Tinos)
- Antonio Giustiniani (archbishop of Naxos) (1701–1730 Died)
- Giovanni Francesco Bossi, O.F.M. Conv. (1730–1732 Died)
- Antonio Maturi, O.F.M. (1733–1749 Resigned)
- Pietro Martire de Stefani, O.P. (1750–1773 Died)
- Giovanni Battista Crispi (1773–1796 Died)
- Godefroid Philippe Joseph de La Porte, O.F.M. Cap. (1796–1799 Died)
- Binkentios Coressi (1800–1814 Appointed, Coadjutor Vicar Apostolic of Constantinople)
- Andrea Veggetti (1816–1838 Died)
- Niccola Candoni (1838–1842 Died)
- Domenico Castelli, O.P. (1844–1852 Died)
- François Cuculla (1853–1864 Died)
- Lorenzo Bergeretti (1864–1742)
- Giuseppe Zaffino (1875–1892 Appointed, Archbishop of Athens)
- Filippo Camassei (1904–1906 Appointed, Patriarch of Jerusalem)
- Leonard Brindisi (1909–1919 Appointed, Archbishop of Corfù, Zante e Cefalonia)

=== Archdiocese of Naxos, Andros, Tinos and Mykonos ===
United: 3 June 1919 with the Diocese of Andros, the Diocese of Mykonos, and the Diocese of Tinos
Latin Name: Naxiensis, Andrensis, Tinensis, et Myconensis

- Leonard Brindisi (1909–1919 Appointed, Archbishop of Corfu, Zakynthos and Cefalonia)
- Matteo Vido (1919–1924 Died)
- Alessandro Guidati (1929–1947 Retired)
- Joannis Baptist Filippucci (Filippoussis) (1947–1959 Died)
- Ioannis Perris (1960–1993 Retired)
- Nikolaos Printezis (1993–2021 Retired)
- Josif Printezis (since 2021)

== Sources and external links ==
- GCatholic.org, with incumbent biography links
