= Diocese of Chios =

Roman Catholic diocese in Greece

Coordinates: 38.3727°N 26.1317°E

Diocese of Chios Dioecesis Chiensis Ρωμαιοκαθολική Επισκοπή Χίου

Catholic

Location
- Country: Greece
- Ecclesiastical province: Naxos, Andros, Tinos and Mykonos
- Metropolitan: Naxos, Andros, Tinos and Mykonos

Statistics
- Area: 4,116 km^{2} (1,589 sq mi)
- Population: Total; Catholics: (as of 2013); 200,520; 450 (0.2%)

Information
- Sui iuris church: Latin Church
- Rite: Roman Rite
- Established: 13th Century
- Cathedral: Cathedral of St. Nicholas, Chios

Current leadership
- Pope: Leo XIV
- Bishop: Sede vacante
- Apostolic Administrator: Josif Printezis

The Diocese of Chios (Latin: Dioecesis Chiensis) is a Latin Church diocese of the Catholic Church located on the island of Chios in the ecclesiastical province of Naxos, Andros, Tinos and Mykonos in Greece.

== History ==
- 1400: Established as Diocese of Chios

== Diocese of Chios ==
Bishops of Chios (Roman rite)

- Constantino Giustiniani, O.P. (27 Aug 1540 - 1546 Died)
- Girolamo Giustiniani, O.P. (15 Dec 1599 - 1604 Resigned)
- Marco Giustiniani, O.P. (31 May 1604 - 1640 Died)
- Andrea Soffiani (10 Mar 1642 - 1686 Died)
- Leonardo Balsarini (Mar 1686 Succeeded - 19 Dec 1698 Resigned)
- Tomaso Giustiniani, C.R.M. (28 May 1700 - 22 Jul 1709 Appointed, Bishop of Nebbio)
- Philippus Bavestrelli (30 Sep 1720 - 6 Apr 1754 Died)
- Giovanni Battista Bavestrelli (16 Sep 1754 - 31 Aug 1772 Appointed, Vicar Apostolic of Constantinople)
- Jean Antoine Voricla (12 Jul 1773 - 28 Feb 1785 Died)
- Pietro Antonio Craveri, O.F.M. Obs. (19 Dec 1785 - 7 Apr 1788 Confirmed, Bishop of Galtelli-Nuoro)
- Nicolao Lorenzo Timoni (15 Sep 1788 - 18 Nov 1812 Died)
- Binkentios Coressi (24 Jul 1797 - Did Not Take Effect)
- Francesco Saverio Dracopoli (19 Dec 1814 - 1 Aug 1821 Died)
- Ignazio Giustiniani (10 May 1829 - 10 Mar 1875 Died)
- Andrea Policarpo Timoni (30 Jul 1875 - 13 May 1879 Appointed, Archbishop of Izmir)
- Ignazio Nicolaus Giustiniani (13 May 1879 - 26 Oct 1884 Died)
- Fedele Abbati (Abati), O.F.M. (23 Jan 1885 - 27 Apr 1890 Resigned)
- Dionisio Nicolosi (6 Jun 1890 - 25 Jan 1916 Died)
- Nikolaos Charichiopoulos (Harikoupoulos) (3 Jan 1917 - 1 Jul 1939 Died)
  - Archbishop Alessandro Guidati (Apostolic Administrator 1939 – 1947.02.22)
  - Archbishop Giovanni Battista Filippucci (Apostolic Administrator 1947.05.29 – 1959.11.06)
  - Fr. Rocco Dellatolla (Apostolic Administrator 1959 – 1961)
  - Archbishop Ioannis Perris (Apostolic Administrator 1961 – 1993)
  - Archbishop Nikolaos Printesis (Apostolic Administrator 1993.04.29 – 2021.01.25)
  - Archbishop Josif Printezis (Apostolic Administrator 2021.01.25 – present)

== See also ==
- Roman Catholicism in Greece

== Sources ==
- GCatholic.org
- Catholic Hierarchy
