= Apostolic Nunciature to Guatemala =

Diplomatic post of the Holy See

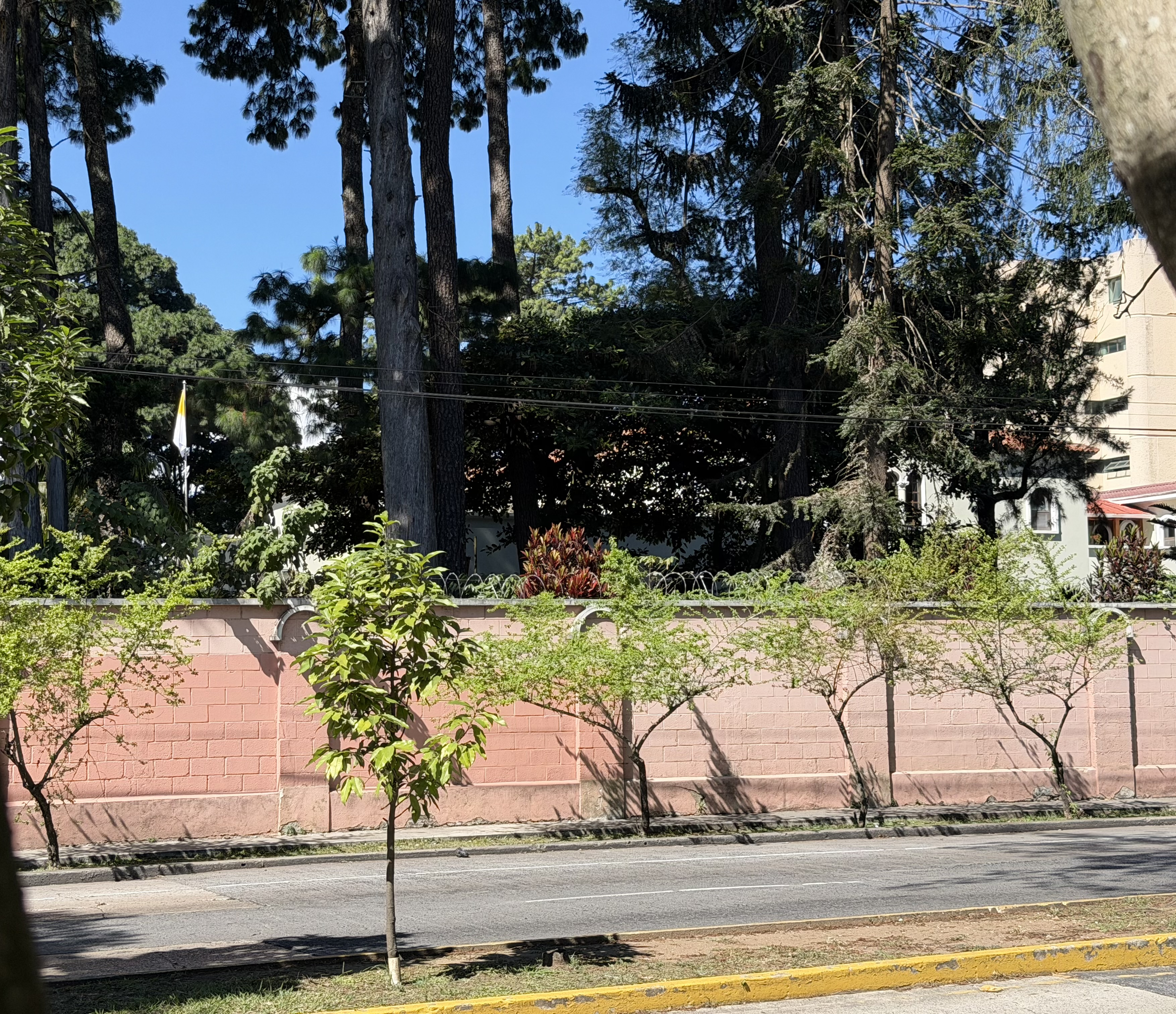
Apostolic Nunciature in Guatemala City

The Apostolic Nunciature to Guatemala is an ecclesiastical office of the Catholic Church in Guatemala. It is a diplomatic post of the Holy See, whose representative is called the Apostolic Nuncio with the rank of an ambassador. The nuncio resides in Guatemala City.

The Holy See used a delegate—a member of its diplomatic corps not granted official status by their host country—to represent its interests to church officials, civil society, and the government. The Holy See and the government of Guatemala established diplomatic relations and Pope Pius XI created the Nunciature to Guatemala on 15 March 1936.

== List of papal representatives to Guatemala ==
Apostolic Delegates to Central America

- Giovanni Battista Marenco (15 September 1920 – 22 October 1921)
- Carlo Chiarlo (28 January 1932 – 30 September 1933)
- Albert Levame (21 December 1933 – 15 March 1936)

Apostolic Nuncios

- Albert Levame (15 March 1936 – 12 November 1939)
- Giuseppe Beltrami (20 February 1940 – 15 November 1945)
- Giovanni Castellani (18 December 1945 – 23 August 1951)
- Gennaro Verolino (5 September 1951 – 25 February 1957)
- Giuseppe Paupini (25 February 1957 – 23 May 1959)
- Ambrogio Marchioni (1 July 1959 – 1 September 1964)
- Bruno Torpigliani (1 September 1964 – 3 August 1968)
- Girolamo Prigione (27 August 1968 – 2 October 1973)
- Emanuele Gerada (8 November 1973 – 15 October 1980)
- Oriano Quilici (26 June 1981 – 11 July 1990)
- Giovanni Battista Morandini (12 September 1990 – 23 April 1997)
- Ramiro Moliner Inglés (10 May 1997 – 17 January 2004)
- Bruno Musarò (10 February 2004 – 5 January 2009)
- Paul Richard Gallagher (19 February 2009 – 11 December 2012)
- Nicolas Thévenin (5 January 2013 – 4 November 2019)
- Francisco Montecillo Padilla (17 April 2020 – present)
