= St. Francis of Assisi Cathedral, Rhodes =

Catholic cathedral in Rhodes, Greece

St. Francis of Assisi Cathedral
- Cathedral of St Francis of Assisi
- Εκκλησία του Αγ. Φραγκίσκου της Ασίζης
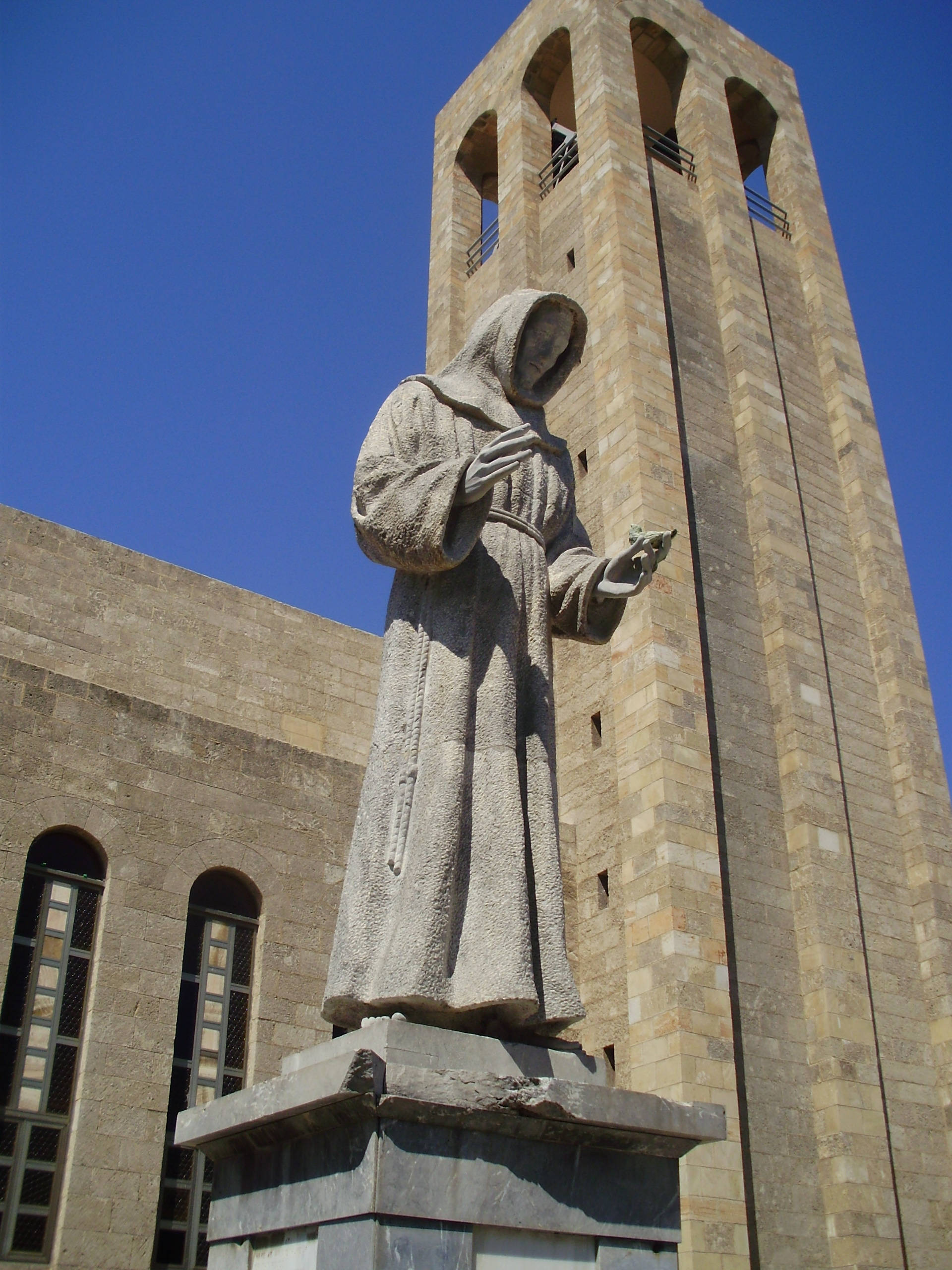
- The cathedral in 2009

- Location of the cathedral in Greece
- St. Francis of Assisi Cathedral
- 36°26′21″N 28°13′30″E
- Location: City of Rhodes, Rhodes, South Aegean
- Country: Greece
- Language: Greek
- Denomination: Roman Catholic Church
- Sui iuris church: Holy See
- Religious institute: Franciscans
- Churchmanship: Latin rite

History
- Status: Cathedral
- Dedication: Francis of Assisi

Architecture
- Functional status: Active
- Architect: Armando Bernabiti
- Architectural type: Church
- Groundbreaking: September 20, 1936
- Completed: 1939

Administration
- Archdiocese: Rhodes

Clergy
- Archbishop: vacant (as of December 2025)

The St. Francis of Assisi Cathedral (Greek: Εκκλησία του Αγ. Φραγκίσκου της Ασίζης, romanized: Ekklisia Agios Fragkiskos), also called the Catholic Cathedral of Rhodes, is a Roman Catholic cathedral located in the city of Rhodes, of the island of Rhodes, in the South Aegean region of Greece. The church is situated near the gate of St. Athanasius, between the two districts Acandia and St. John. The church is the seat for the Archbishop of Rhodes.

== Overview ==
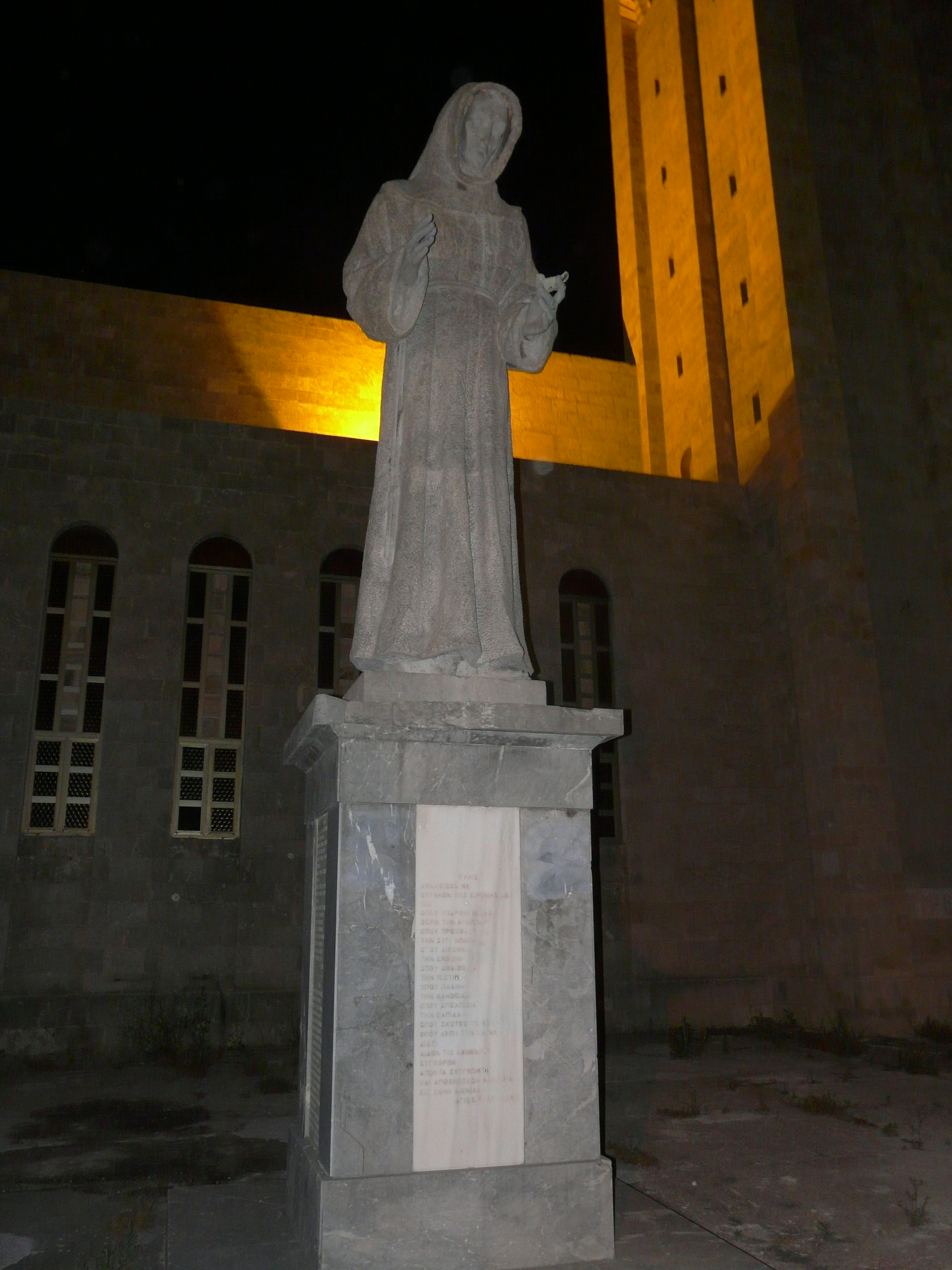
View of the statue of Saint Francis at night

On September 20, 1936 the first stone was laid in the presence of Archbishop Giovanni Castellani and the Italian governor of the Dodecanese, Mario Lago. The works for the construction of the church, designed by architect Armando Bernabiti, ended in 1939. In 1940, the church was equipped with an organ and enriched with 14 terracotta bas-reliefs depicting the Stations of the Cross, the sculptor Monteleone.

The frescoes on the walls of the choir were painted by Pietro Gaudenzi. On the ceiling above the central altar, a cross rises, around which symbols of the four evangelists are arranged symmetrically. Gaudenzi also are the paintings on the side altars representing, respectively, the Annunciation and St. Maurice.

== See also ==
- Roman Catholicism in Greece
- List of churches in Greece
