= Antonio Samorè =

Italian cardinal and diplomat

His Eminence Antonio Samorè
- Cardinal, Librarian of Holy Roman Church
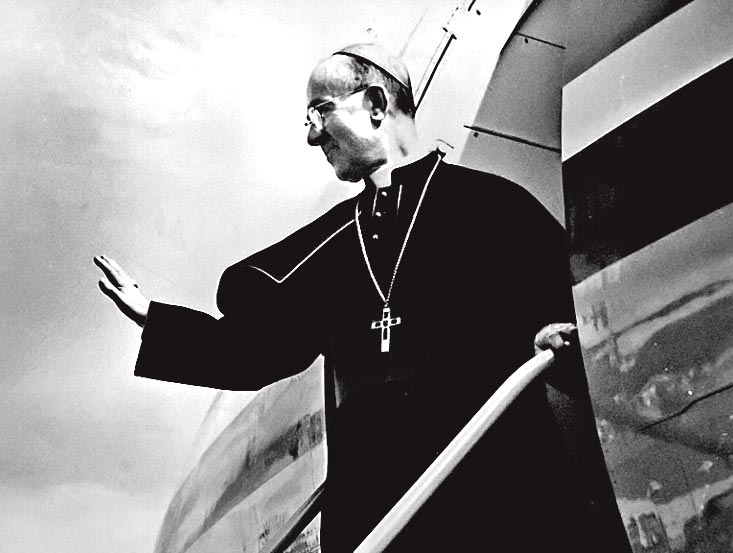
- Samorè in 1978
- Church: Catholic Church
- Diocese: Sabina–Poggio Mirteto
- Appointed: 25 January 1974
- Term ended: 3 February 1983
- Previous posts: Apostolic Nuncio to Colombia (1950–1953); Titular Archbishop of Ternobus (1950–1967); Secretary of the Sacred Congregation for Extraordinary Ecclesiastical Affairs (1953–1967); Cardinal-Priest of Santa Maria Sopra Minerva (1967–1974); President of the Sacred Congregation for Extraordinary Ecclesiastical Affairs (1967–1968); President of the Pontifical Commission for Latin America (1967–1968); Prefect of the Sacred Congregation for the Discipline of the Sacraments (1968–1974)

Orders
- Ordination: 10 June 1928 by Ersilio Menzani
- Consecration: 16 April 1950 by Clemente Micara
- Created cardinal: 26 June 1967 by Paul VI
- Rank: Cardinal-priest (1967–1974); Cardinal-bishop (1974–1983)

Personal details
- Born: 4 December 1905 Bardi, Kingdom of Italy
- Died: 3 February 1983 (aged 77) Rome, Italy
- Denomination: Roman Catholic
- Motto: Auxilium a Domino
- Coat of arms

Styles of Antonio Samorè
- Reference style: His Eminence
- Spoken style: Your Eminence
- Informal style: Cardinal
- See: Sabina–Poggio Mirteto (suburbicarian)

Antonio Samorè (4 December 1905 – 3 February 1983) was an Italian cardinal and diplomat of the Catholic Church.

== Biography ==
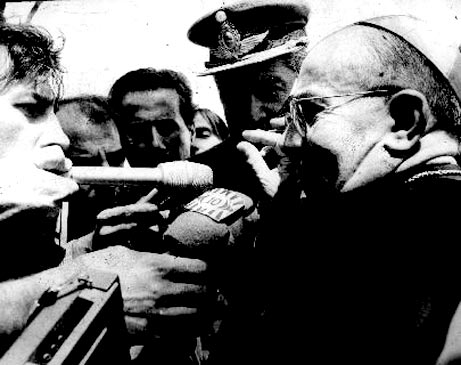
Cardinal Samorè speaking to the Argentine press during the Beagle Channel conflict, 1978.

Samorè was born in Bardi, near Parma. After studying at the seminary in Piacenza and the Pontifical Lateran University in Rome, he was ordained to the priesthood by Bishop Ersilio Menzani on 10 June 1928. Samorè then did pastoral work in Piacenza until 1932, when he became attaché and secretary of the Lithuanian nunciature. He was raised to the rank of Privy Chamberlain of His Holiness on 28 February 1935, and later a Domestic Prelate of His Holiness on 27 February 1947. In 1938, Samorè was named secretary of the nunciature to Switzerland and also entered the Roman Curia as an official of the Secretariat of State. He was then counselor of the apostolic delegation to the United States from 1947 to 1950.

On 30 January 1950, Samorè was appointed Apostolic Nuncio to Colombia and Titular Archbishop of Tirnovo by Pope Pius XII. He received his episcopal consecration on the following 16 April from Clemente Micara, with Archbishop Filippo Bernardini and Bishop Alberto Carinci serving as co-consecrators, in the church of Santa Maria sopra Minerva. Samorè later returned to Rome upon his naming as Secretary of the Congregation for Extraordinary Ecclesiastical Affairs on 7 February 1953. As Secretary, he was the second-highest official of that dicastery. Before and after the Second Vatican Council (1962–1965), later as President of the Pontifical Commission for Latin America, he was charged by Pope Paul VI to stem support of liberation theology and "ecclesial base communities" by the Latin American Episcopal Conference (CELAM). Samorè was one of the few people made privy to the third part of the Secret of Fátima by Pope St. John XXIII.

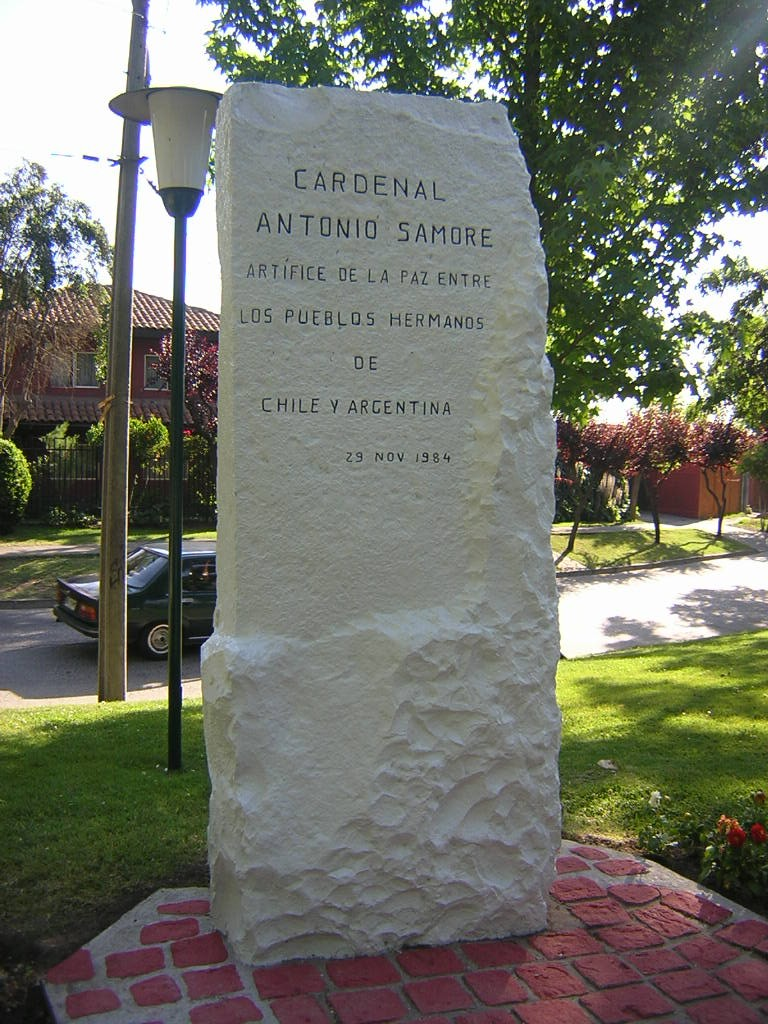
Homage to Cardinal Samorè, in Santiago de Chile.

He was created Cardinal-Priest of Santa Maria sopra Minerva by Paul VI in the consistory of 26 June 1967. A protégé of Alfredo Ottaviani, the heavily conservative Samorè advised Pope Paul against granting his approval to artificial birth control. The next year, on 1 November 1968, Paul appointed him Prefect of the Congregation for the Discipline of the Sacraments. Following the death of Giovanni Urbani in 1969, Cardinal Samorè was one of the leading contenders to succeed him as Patriarch of Venice; the position went to Bishop Albino Luciani. Samorè, upon resigning as Prefect on 25 January 1974, was named Archivist and Librarian of the Holy Roman Church. On 12 December of that same year, he became Cardinal Bishop of Sabina–Poggio Mirteto.

From 1978 to 1983, he acted as a special representative of Pope John Paul II, earning Samorè the nickname "the Vatican Kissinger", for mediating the dispute between Chile and Argentina, which were on the brink of war because of a disagreement concerning the ownership of the strategic Picton, Lennox and Nueva islands during the Beagle conflict. The international pass of Puyehue that links Osorno in Chile with Bariloche (Argentina) was later renamed Cardenal Antonio Samorè Pass.

Samorè died of a heart attack in Rome, at age 77. He is buried in the church of the Carmelite monastery of Vetralla.

Catholic Church titles
Preceded by Giuseppe Beltrami	Apostolic Nuncio to Colombia; 30 January 1950 – 7 February 1953	Succeeded by Paolo Bertoli
Preceded by Carlo Confalonieri	President of the Pontifical Commission for Latin America; 1967–1968	Succeeded by Carlo Confalonieri
Preceded by none	President of the Congregation for Extraordinary Ecclesiastical Affairs; 1967–1968	Succeeded by post abolished
Preceded by Francis Brennan	Prefect of the Sacred Congregation for the Discipline of the Sacraments; 1 November 1968 – 25 January 1974	Succeeded by James Knox
Preceded by Eugène-Gabriel-Gervais-Laurent Tisserant	Archivist of the Holy Roman Church; 25 January 1974 – 3 February 1983	Succeeded by Alfons Maria Stickler SDB
Preceded by Eugène-Gabriel-Gervais-Laurent Tisserant	Librarian of the Holy Roman Church; 25 January 1974 – 3 February 1983	Succeeded by Alfons Maria Stickler SDB
