= Apostolic Prefecture of Rhodes and adjacent islands =

The Apostolic Prefecture of Rhodes and adjacent islands was a Latin Catholic apostolic prefecture (missionary pre-diocesan jurisdiction, not entitled to a titular bishop) in the Greek Aegean islands.

== History ==
It was established on 14 August 1897 on territory once belonging to the then long-suppressed (but titular see-turned) historical Metropolitan Roman Catholic Archdiocese of Rhodes.

It was suppressed on 28 March 1928 to (re)establish on its territory the resurrected, but no longer Metropolitan Roman Catholic Archdiocese of Rhodes, which is also exempt, i.e. directly subject to the Holy See.

== Ordinaries ==
(all Latin missionary members of the Friars Minor (O.F.M.)

Apostolic Prefects of Rhodes and adjacent islands

- Andrea Felice da Ienne, O.F.M. (1897.08.31 – 1910)
- Ignace Beaufays, O.F.M. (1911.03.27 – ?)
- Bonaventura Rossetti, O.F.M. (? – ?); also? Apostolic Vicar of Libya (1907.08 – ?)
- Florido Ambrogio Acciari, O.F.M. (? – 1928.03.28), later apostolic administrator (1928.03.28 – 1929) and Archbishop (1938.03.30 – 1970.03.10) of successor archdiocese Rhodes

== See also ==
- Roman Catholicism in Greece

== Sources and external links ==
- GigaCatholic
