= Francesco Niccolini =

Italian archbishop and diplomat

- Church: Catholic Church
- See: Archbishop of Rhodes
- Appointed: 10 September 1685
- Term ended: 4 February 1692
- Other posts: Nuncio to Portugal, Nuncio to France

Orders
- Consecration: 16 December 1685 (Bishop) by Jean-Baptiste Adhémar de Monteil de Grignan

Personal details
- Born: 1639 Florence, Tuscany
- Died: February 4, 1692 (aged 52–53) Paris, France

Francesco Niccolini (also Nicolini, 1639 – 1692) was an Italian archbishop and diplomat, Apostolic Nuncio to Portugal from 1685 to 1690 and to France from 1690 to 1692.

== Life ==
Born in Florence in 1639, he was nephew of the archbishop of the city Pietro Niccolini. He graduated in utroque iure in Pisa. He made a rapid career in the administration of the Papal States holding the roles of governor of Fabriano in 1667, of Camerino from May 1668, of Ascoli from April 1669 and Vice-legate of Avignon from 1677 to 1685.

Destined for the Nunciature to Portugal, he was appointed titular Archbishop of Rhodes on 10 September 1685 and consecrated bishop in the church of the Jesuit College of Avignon on 16 December 1685 by Jean-Baptiste Adhémar de Monteil de Grignan, coadjutor of the Archbishop of Arles.

Francesco Niccolini remained as a nuncio in Portugal until 1690, when he was nominated nuncio to France. Reached Paris, he had his first meeting with the Sun King on November 28 of that year.

Seal of Francesco Niccolini from "Catalogue des bulles et sceaux conservés aux archives départementales de Vaucluse" (France)

He died in Paris on 4 February 1692 and was buried in the Capuchin church on rue Saint-Honoré.
