= Armando Bernabiti =

Italian architect

Armando Bernabiti (Crevalcore, 4 March 1900 – Crevalcore, 4 March 1970) was an Italian architect.

== Life and career ==
Born in Crevalcore, Bernabiti studied at the Academy of Fine Arts in Bologna and began working as an architect in Paris and Rome. He designed public and private buildings in a mostly Rationalist style, though with strong influence from local vernacular architecture.

=== Portolago ===
In 1923, Bernabiti was invited by Benito Mussolini along with Rodolfo Petracco to design the city of Portolago in Leros. The city's planning and architecture was inspired by modernism, Futurism, and classical geometry. Described as "the only truly rationalist town outside of Italy", their work on Portolago has been praised for its beauty, imagination and inclusivist nature.

=== Rhodes ===
National Theatre of Rhodes, 2012

In 1927, he moved to the Dodecanese, which had been an Italian possession since 1912. Much of his work in Rhodes to helped to solidify Italian dominance on the island by transforming it into a destination for culture and tourism. His first work in Rhodes was the Archaeological Museum square in 1928. The design aimed to restore of the original character of the buildings with cues from Italian architecture to make it feel familiar to visitors.

Aquarium of Rhodes, 2023

The Aquarium of Rhodes, an Art Deco design, was constructed between 1934 and 1935. When it first started operations in 1937, it was named the Reale Istituto di Ricerche Biologiche di Rodi (Royal Biological Research Institute of Rhodes). Research here included the hydrology, sponges, and fisheries of the Aegean. In 1937, Bernabiti designed the National Theatre of Rhodes (previously Teatro Giacomo Puccini) in the International Style with glass brick masonry. Using a modernist style, Bernabiti designed the Town Hall and the Casa del Fascio, the Cinema Theatre Roma, the Hotel Roma, a primary school and nursery, residential and commercial areas, and residences for military officers. The ELLI building was designed and built from 1936 to 1938 to house bathing facilities, a refreshment room, and a diving boat in the sea. It is designed in an eclectic style, blending the modernism with oriental details, to feature a prominent circular hall with arched window doors and numerous lozenge-form skylights.

=== Other work ===
His other notable works include the Diagoras Stadium, St. Francis of Assisi Cathedral, and the Kallithea Thermal baths. In Kos, he designed both the Casa del Fascio and the Casa del Balilla.
