= Lakki, Leros =

Lakki Λακκί
- Settlement
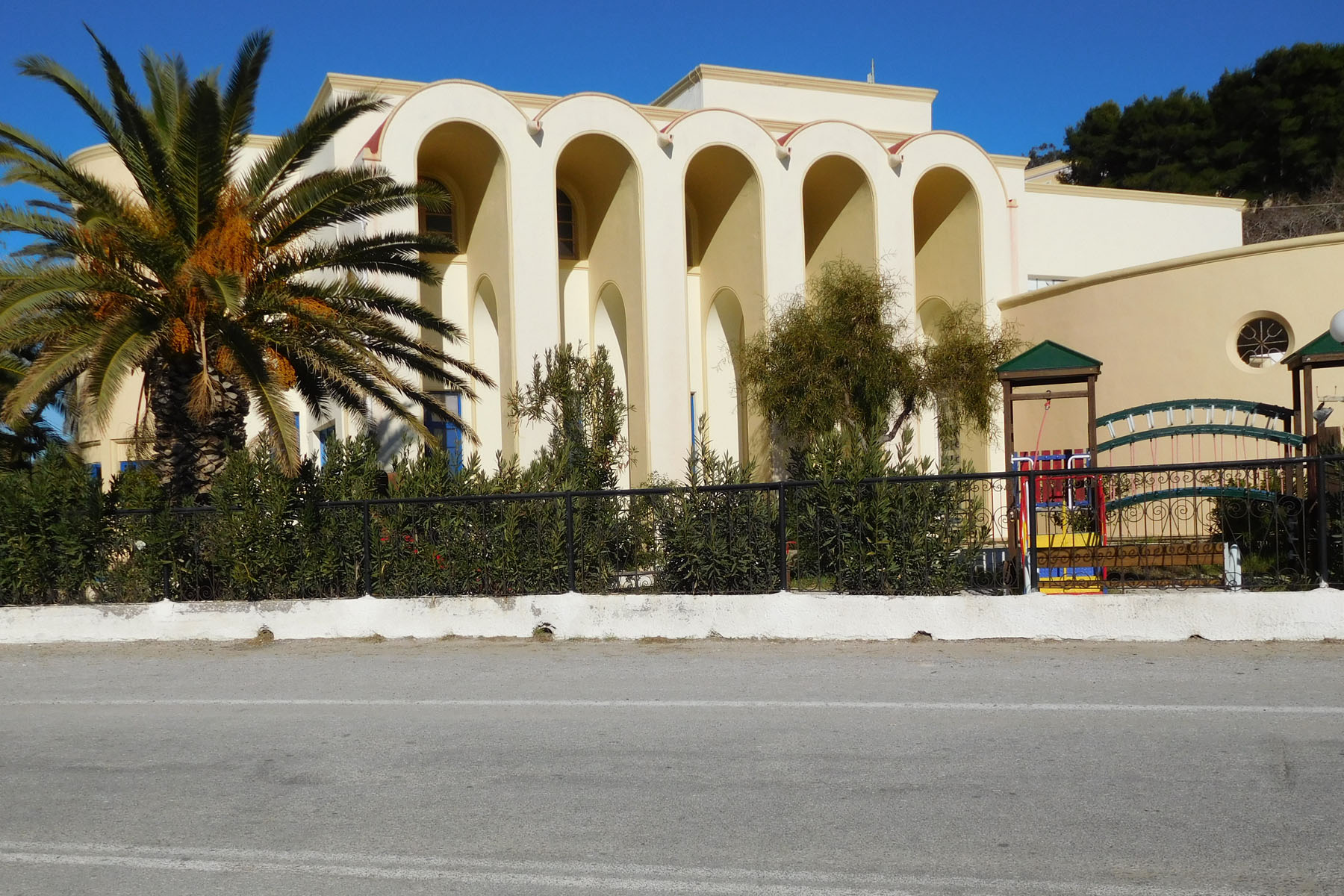
- The school of Lakki

- Location within Greece
- Coordinates: 37°07′54″N 26°51′07″E
- Country: Greece
- Administrative region: South Aegean
- Regional unit: Kalymnos
- Municipality: Leros

Population (2021)
  - Total: 2,093
- Time zone: UTC+2 (EET)
  - Summer (DST): UTC+3 (EEST)

Lakki (Greek: Λακκί), known as Portolago (Greek: Πόρτο Λάγο) until 1947, is a community on the Greek island of Leros, in the Dodecanese, at the head of Lakki Bay. The population was 2,093 at the 2021 census.

The area was built up as the main base of the Italian Royal Navy in the Dodecanese starting in 1923. The town of Portolago was founded in the 1930s, under Italian rule, as a new model town, most of whose inhabitants were from the Italian military. After Leros was transferred to Greece in 1947, it was renamed Lakki.

== History ==
During Ottoman times, the area was known as Lakki and had just a few fishing huts. Following the Italo-Turkish War in 1912, the Dodecanese became part of Italy. As one of the largest bays in the Aegean, the Italians saw its potential as a naval base to expand their military presence in the eastern Mediterranean. In the 1920s and 30s, an entire town was built from scratch by the architects Armando Bernabiti and Rodolfo Petracco. The resulting town was named Portolago, allegedly after Mario Lago, the Governor of the Italian colony from 1922 to 1936, although some sources say the Italians had already named the bay Portolago due to its resemblance to a lake and the arrival of a Governor called Lago was purely a coincidence. Etymologically the toponym is in fact derived from the word Ancient Greek λάκκος (lắkkos) which meant generally "a pond" evidently referring to the natural shape of the harbour, from which derived the ancient Λακκίον (Lakkíon) and, after the apocope, the nowadays Greek toponym, already anchored semantically at the same meaning.

Portolago has been described as "the only true rationalist town outside of Italy."

The buildings include:

- Casa del Balilla (House of the Fascist Youth) (1933), Bernabiti
- Covered market (1934–1936), Petracco
- Elementary school and creche (1934–1936), Petracco
- City Hall and Casa del Fascio (Fascist Party headquarters) (1935–1938), Bernabiti
- Cinema/Theater (1936–1938), Bernabiti
- Church of Saint Francis (now of Saint Nicholas) (1935–1939), Bernabiti

=== Naval base ===
Portolago was built up as the main base of the Italian Royal Navy in the Dodecanese starting in 1923, as the harbor of Rhodes was too small. The bay is deep, and about 3.5 km long and over 1 km wide, making it a suitable location for a naval base, in fact one of the best in the eastern Mediterranean. Under Italian rule, Portolago Bay (as it was then called) was heavily fortified. There was a double boom across the narrow entrance, and several batteries of guns covering it.

The naval base included buildings and naval installations. There was no airstrip but there was a seaplane ramp. The island garrison included about 6,500 men. It was the home port for two destroyers, two small torpedo boats, and four submarines.
