= Giovanni Castellani =

Italian prelate (1888–1953)

Giovanni Maria Emilio Castellani O.F.M.
- Apostolic Nuncio to Guatemala and El Salvador
- Church: Catholic Church
- See: Apostolic Nunciature to Guatemala & El Salvador
- In office: 13 December 1945 – 23 August 1951
- Predecessor: Giuseppe Beltrami
- Successor: Gennaro Verolino
- Other posts: Official of the Secretariat of State (1951-1953); Titular Archbishop of Perge (1937-1953)
- Previous posts: Vicar Apostolic of Addis Abeba (1937-1945); Apostolic Nuncio to Italian East Africa (1937-1945); Archbishop of Rhodos (1929-1937)

Orders
- Ordination: 4 September 1910
- Consecration: 2 April 1929 by Bonaventura Cerretti

Personal details
- Born: 13 April 1888 Kingdom of Italy
- Died: 30 August 1953 (aged 65) Rome, Italy

Giovanni Maria Emilio Castellani O.F.M. (13 April 1888 – 30 August 1953) was an Italian prelate of the Catholic Church, who became an archbishop in 1929 and led jurisdictions in Greece and Ethiopia. He worked in the diplomatic service of the Holy See from 1945 to 1953.

== Biography ==
Giovanni Castellani was born in Civitella, in the Diocese of Todi, Italy, on 13 April 1888. He was ordained a priest of the Franciscans on 4 September 1910.

On 5 January 1929, Pope Pius XI appointed him Archbishop of Rhodes, Greece. He received his episcopal consecration on 2 April 1929 from Cardinal Bonaventura Cerretti in the Basilica of Saint Mary of the Angels in Assisi.

On 25 March 1937, Pope Pius named him titular archbishop of Perge, Apostolic Delegate to Italian East Africa, (Note: Italian East Africa was an Italian colony formed in 1936 through the merger of Italian Somalia, Italian Eritrea, and the newly occupied Ethiopian Empire, conquered in the Second Italo-Ethiopian War.) and Vicar Apostolic of Addis Abeda, Ethiopia.

On 18 December 1945, Pope Pius XII named him Apostolic Nuncio to both El Salvador and Guatemala. He took up a position in the offices of the Secretariat of State in Rome on 23 August 1951. (Note: His successor in El Salvador and Guatemala, Gennaro Verolino, was appointed on 5 September 1951.)

He died in Rome on 30 August 1953.
