= Giuseppe Beltrami =

Italian cardinal (1889–1973)

His Eminence Giovanni Beltrami
- Apostolic Internuncio Emeritus to the Netherlands
- Church: Roman Catholic Church
- Appointed: 31 January 1959
- Term ended: 26 June 1967
- Predecessor: Paolo Giobbe
- Successor: Angelo Felici
- Other post: Cardinal-Priest of Santa Maria Liberatrice a Monte Testaccio pro hac vice (1967–73)
- Previous posts: Apostolic Nuncio to El Salvador (1940–45); Apostolic Nuncio to Guatemala (1940–45); Titular Archbishop of Damascus (1940–67); Apostolic Nuncio to Colombia (1945–48); Apostolic Nuncio to Lebanon (1950–59)

Orders
- Ordination: 5 March 1916 by Giousè Signori
- Consecration: 7 April 1940 by Luigi Maglione
- Created cardinal: 26 June 1967 by Pope Paul VI
- Rank: Cardinal-priest

Personal details
- Born: Giuseppe Beltrami; 17 January 1889 Fossano, Kingdom of Italy
- Died: 13 December 1973 (aged 84) Rome, Italy
- Buried: Fossano Cathedral
- Education: Pontifical Roman Athenaeum Saint Apollinare
- Motto: Illuminato mea Dominus

Styles of Giuseppe Beltrami
- Reference style: His Eminence
- Spoken style: Your Eminence
- Informal style: Cardinal
- See: none

Giuseppe Beltrami (17 January 1889 – 13 December 1973) was an Italian cardinal of the Roman Catholic Church who served as internuncio to the Netherlands from 1959 to 1967, and was elevated to the cardinalate in 1967.

== Biography ==
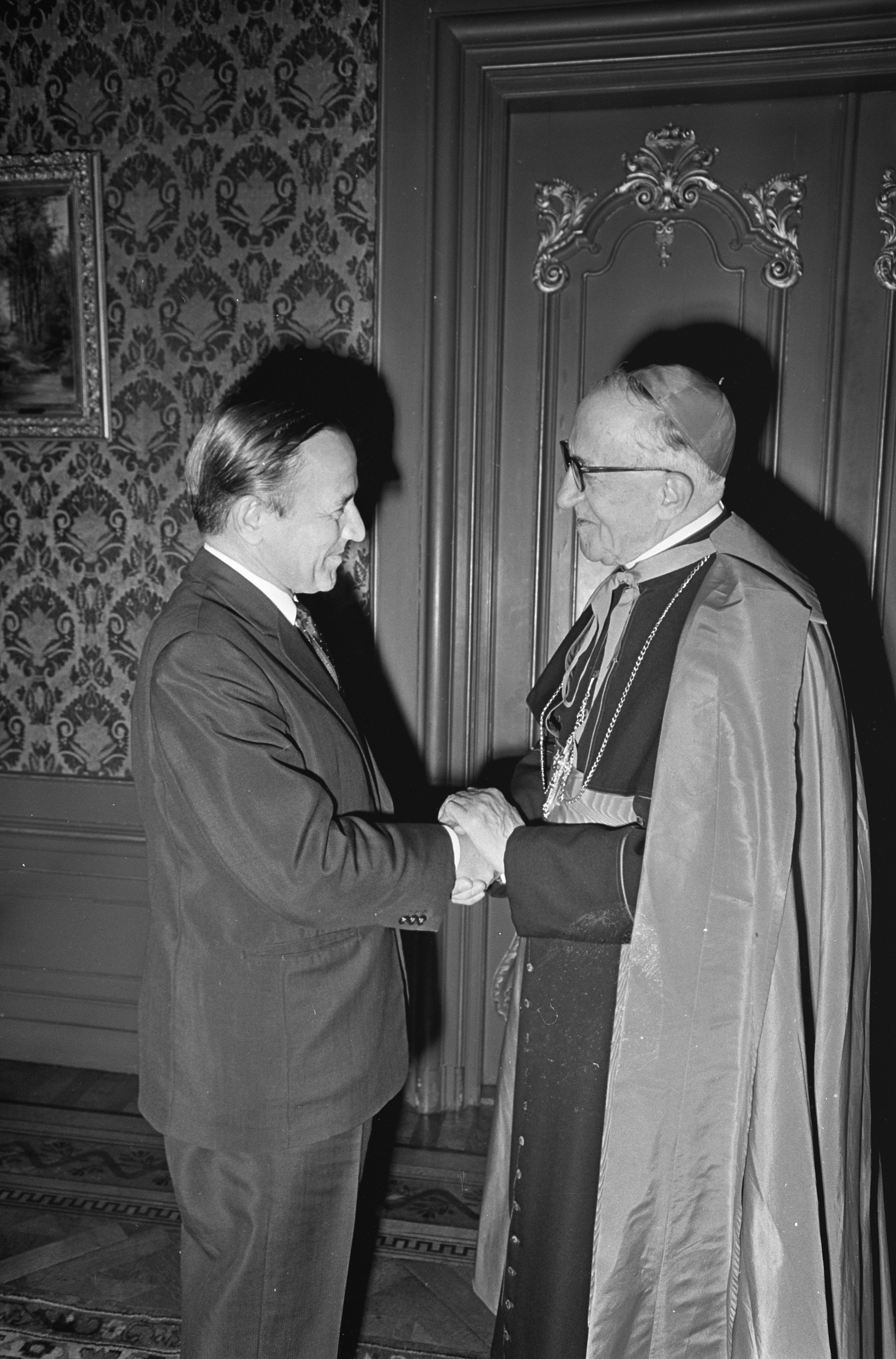
Piet de Jong and Giuseppe Beltrami (1967)

Born in Fossano, Giuseppe Beltrami attended the seminary in Fossano before being ordained to the priesthood on 5 March 1916. He served as a chaplain in the Italian Army during World War I (1916–1919), and then studied until 1923 at the Pontifical Roman Athenaeum S. Apollinare, from where he obtained his doctorates in theology and in canon law, and the Royal University, earning a doctorate in letters.

From 1923 to 1926, Beltrami was a staff member of the Vatican Library. He was raised to the rank of an honorary chamberlain of his holiness on 14 July 1924 and became an official of the Secretariat of State in 1926. Monsignor Beltrami then served as a lawyer for the causes of canonisation and beatification in the Sacred Congregation of Rites until 1940, also being named a privy chamberlain of his holiness on 9 July 1926.

On 20 February 1940, Beltrami was appointed Apostolic Nuncio to Guatemala and El Salvador and titular archbishop of Damascus. He received his episcopal consecration on the following 7 April from Cardinal Luigi Maglione, with Archbishop Gabriele Vettori and Bishop Angelo Soracco serving as co-consecrators, in the church of San Carlo al Corso.

Beltrami was named Nuncio to Colombia on 15 November 1945; during his tenure there, he served as the papal legate to the National Eucharistic Congress in Bogotá on 29 June 1946. During his tenure, Tulio Botero Salazar was appointed private secretary of the nunciature. The Archbishop worked as a nuncio at the disposition of the Secretariat of State from 1948 to 1950, when he was assigned as Nuncio to Lebanon on 4 October. Beltrami was appointed internuncio to the Netherlands on 31 January 1959 and faced much theological dissidence in the usually progressive country. The Dutch Catholic clergy once complained that Beltrami "kept the wires to Rome hot with reports of heresy in Holland".

He attended the Second Vatican Council from 1962 to 1965. Pope Paul VI created him Cardinal Priest of S. Maria Liberatrice al Monte Testaccio in the consistory of 26 June 1967. The appointment of the successor to Beltrami's diplomatic post in the Netherlands was published on 22 July 1967. He lost the right to participate in a papal conclave upon reaching the age of 80, on 1 January 1971.

The Cardinal died in Rome, at age 84. He is buried in the cathedral of his native Fossano.

Catholic Church titles
Preceded by unknown	Nuncio to Guatemala; 1940–1945	Succeeded by Giovanni Castellani, OFM
Preceded by Albert Levame	Nuncio to El Salvador; 1940–1945	Succeeded by Giovanni Castellani, OFM
Preceded by Paolo Giobbe	Nuncio to Colombia; 1945–1948	Succeeded by Antonio Samoré
Preceded by Alcide Marina, CM	Nuncio to Lebanon; 1950–1959	Succeeded by Paolo Bertoli
Preceded by Paolo Giobbe	Internuncio to the Netherlands; 1959–1967	Succeeded by Angelo Felici
