= Aquarium of Rhodes =

- Interactive map of Aquarium of Rhodes
- 36.4571°N 28.2207°E
- Date opened: 1937
- Location: Rhodes, Greece
- Total volume of tanks: 80,000 litres (21,000 US gal)
- Website: http://rhodes-aquarium.hcmr.gr

The Aquarium of Rhodes, also known as the Hydrobiological Station of Rhodes, is a research centre, aquarium and museum in Rhodes, Greece. It was built in the 1930s, when the island was under the Italian rule and is currently administered by the Hellenic Centre for Marine Research.

== History ==
The building, an Art Deco design by the Italian architect Armando Bernabiti, was constructed between 1934 and 1935. When it first started operations in 1937, it was named the Reale Istituto di Ricerche Biologiche di Rodi (Royal Biological Research Institute of Rhodes). Research here included the hydrology, sponges, and fisheries of the Aegean.

When the island was handed back to Greece in 1947, the facility was operated as part of the "Hellenic Hydrobiological Institute". Since 1963 it has been known as the "Hydrobiological Station of Rhodes", and is administered by the National Centre of Marine Research. An exhibition area was added to the north side of the building in 1971–72.

== Layout ==
The aquarium is in the basement of the building; and it is a corridor designed to look like an underwater cave. The tanks along each side of the corridor are filled with approximately 80,000 litres (21,000 US gal) of filtered seawater, providing a natural environment for the residents. There is also a freshwater tank housing a threatened species that is endemic to Rhodes, the Rhodes minnow.

The displays in the museum include sea anemones and plants, octopuses, sea urchins, corals, bivalves, crabs, lobsters, sea turtles, dolphins, seals, mollusks, sharks and many fish, that were all found in Rhodes and the surrounding Dodecanese islands. A really unique one is a 2000 years old skeleton of a Mediterranean monk seal that was found in a grave at an archaeological site at the port of Rhodes.

There is a separate holding facility for incoming specimens and organisms that need special handling, where the facility also cares for sea turtles and seals that have been injured nearby.

== Gallery ==
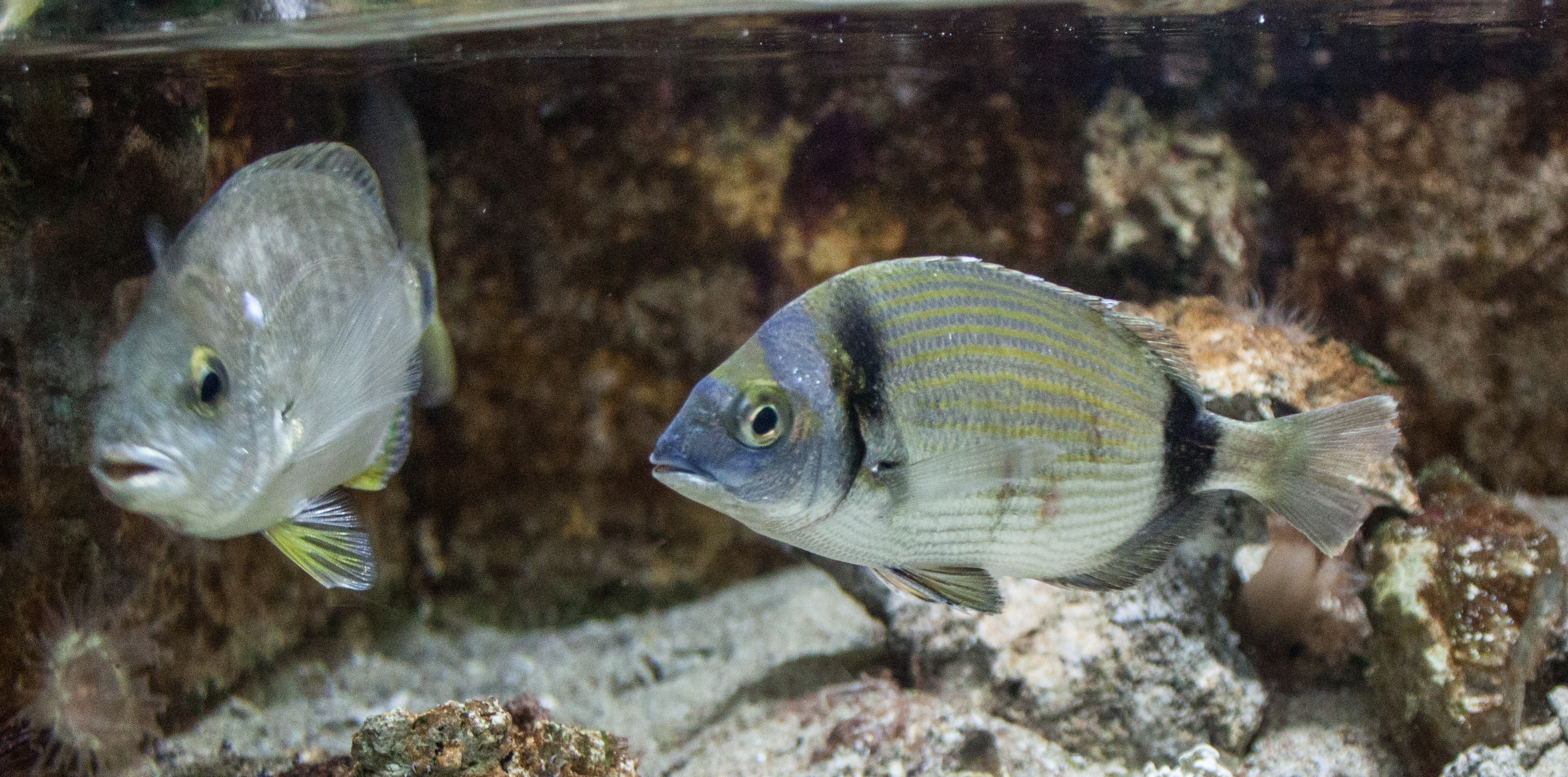
Diplodus vulgaris

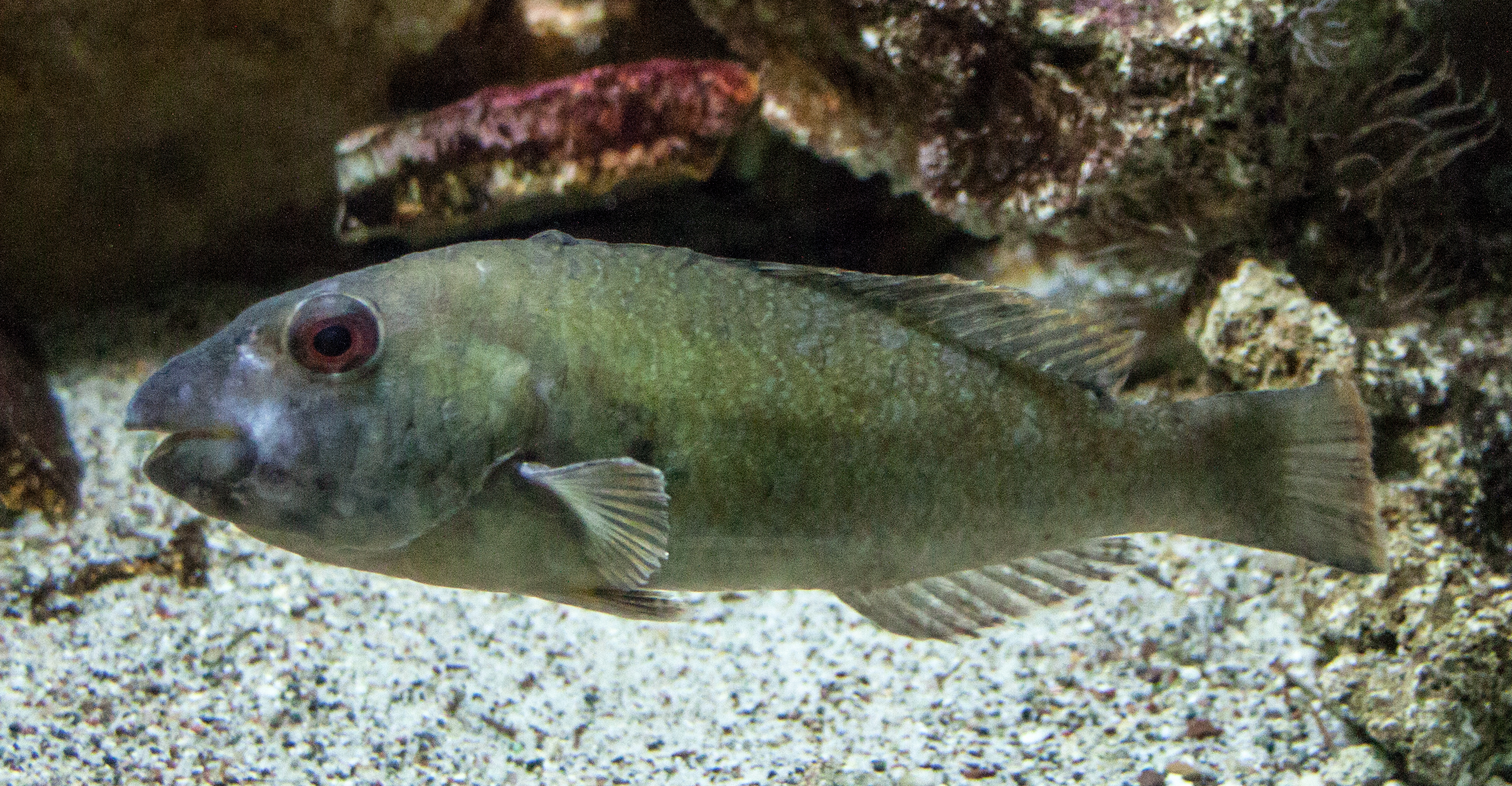
Sparisoma cretense

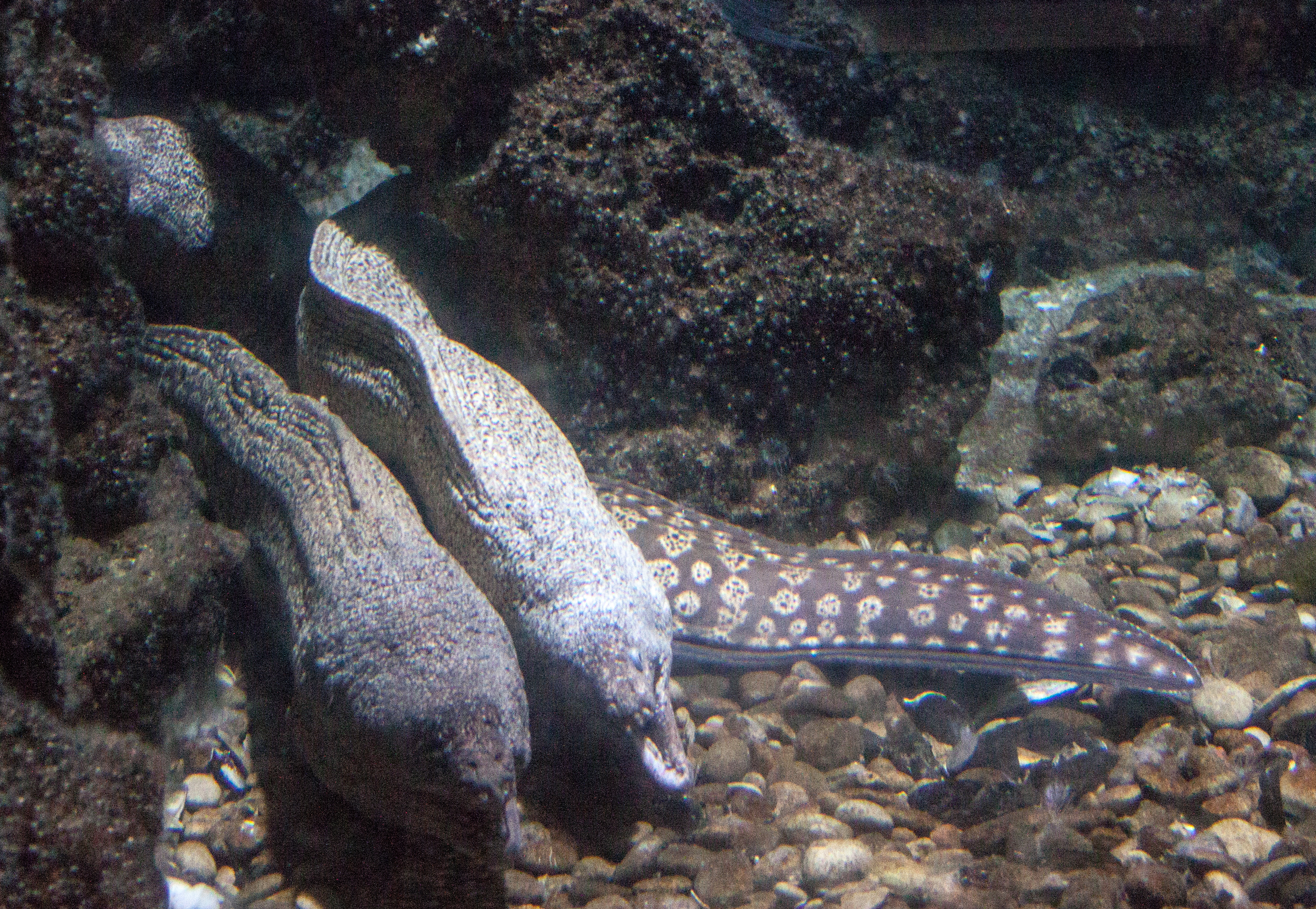
Muraena helena

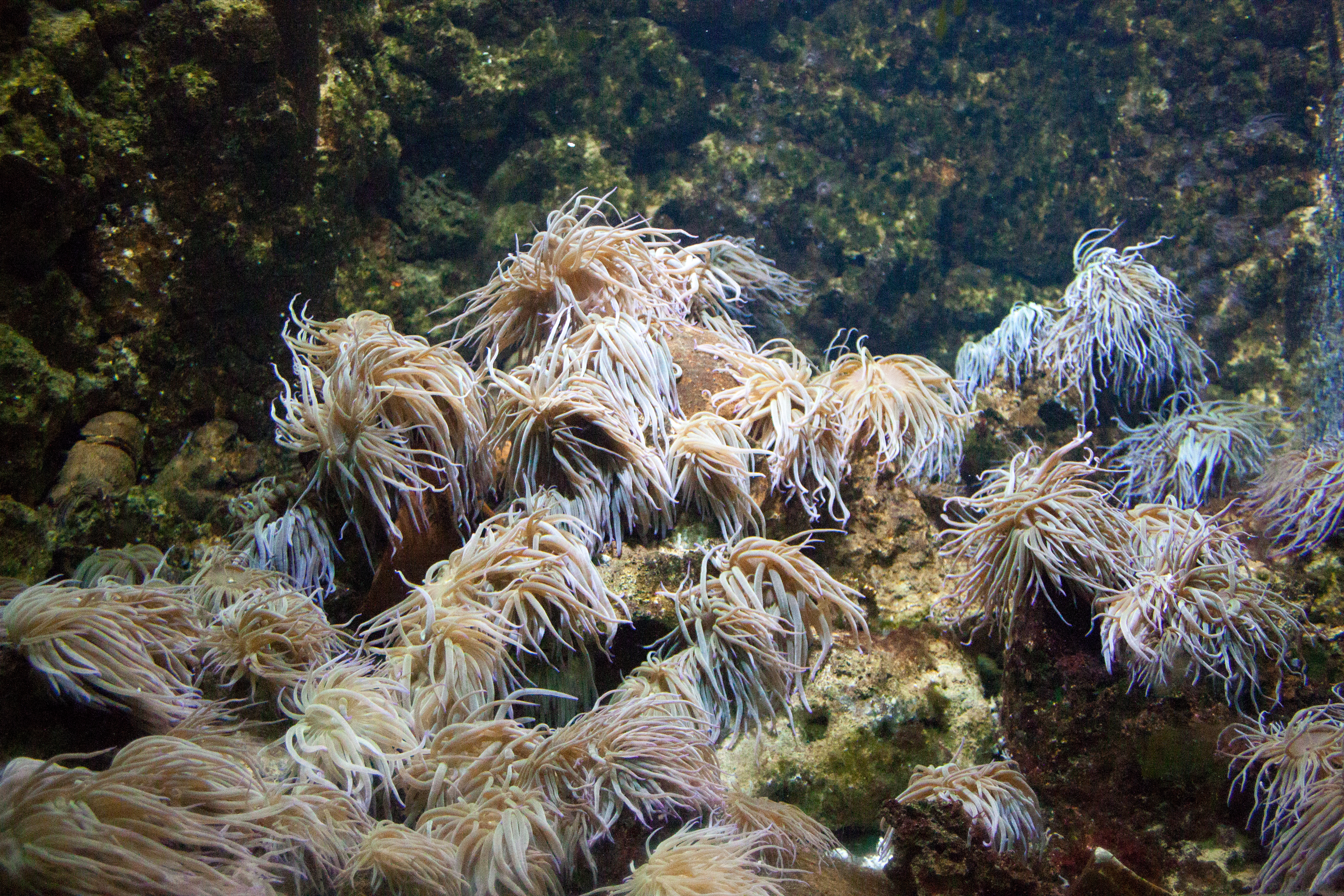
Anemonia viridis

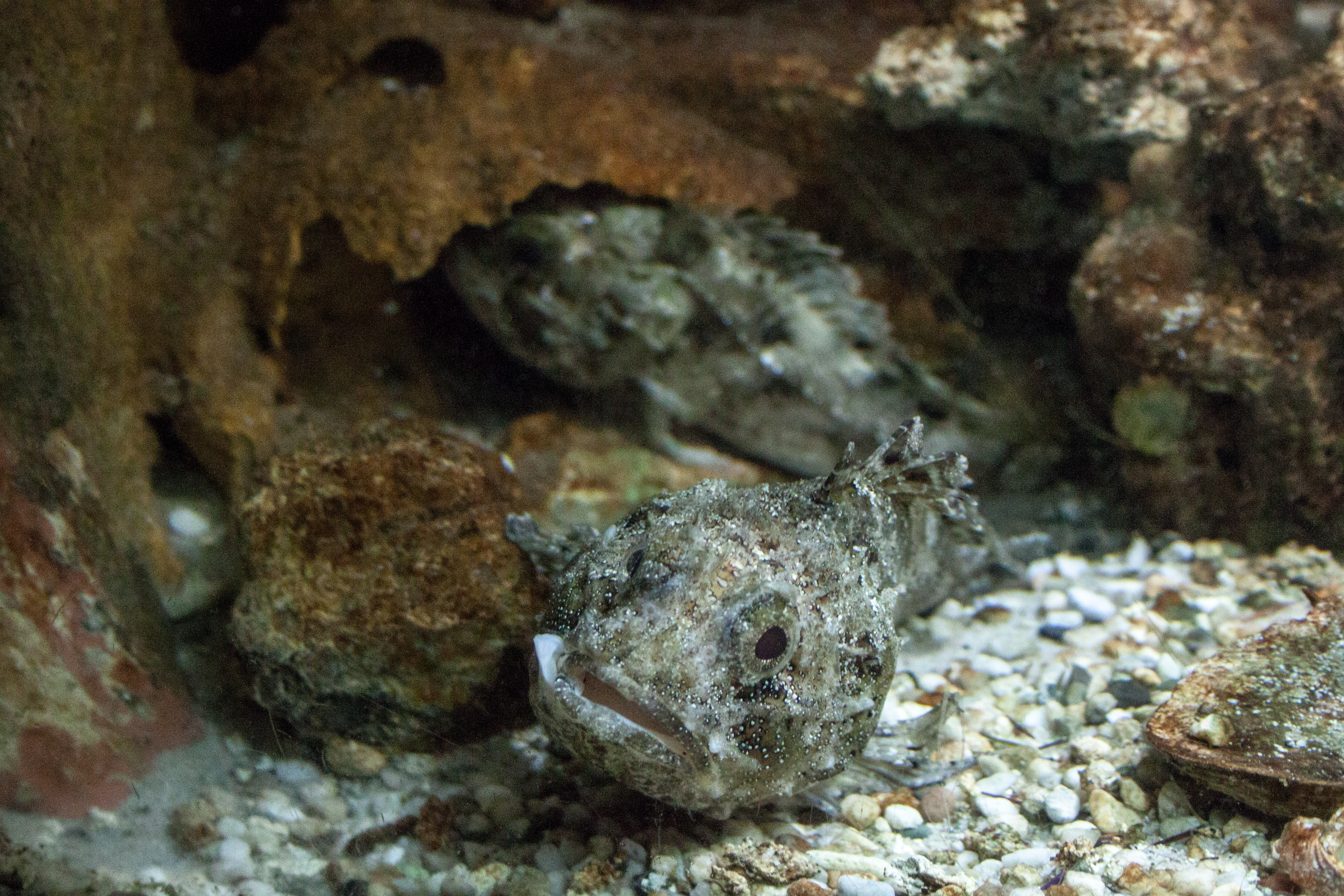
Scorpaena porcus

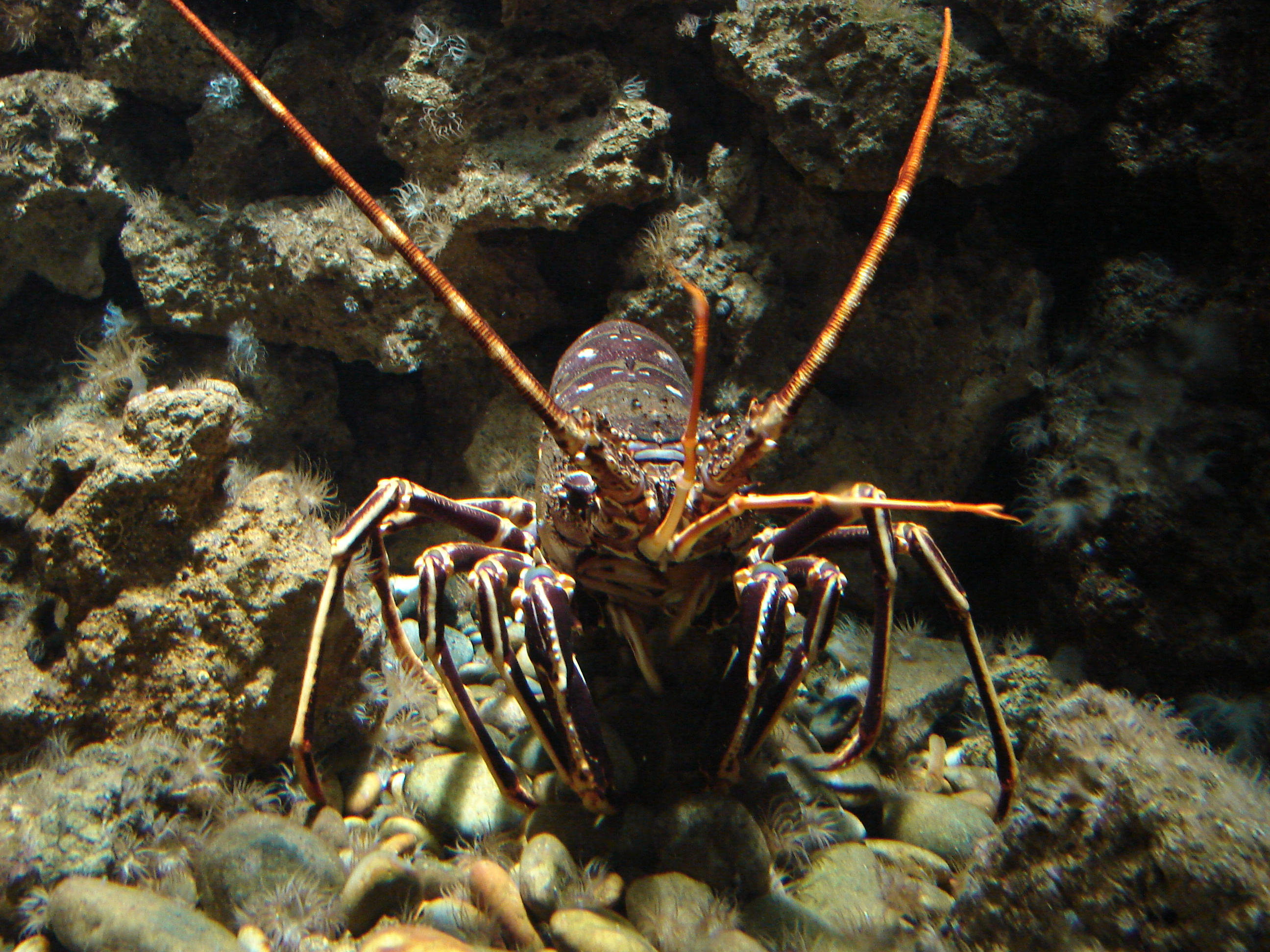
Palinurus elephas

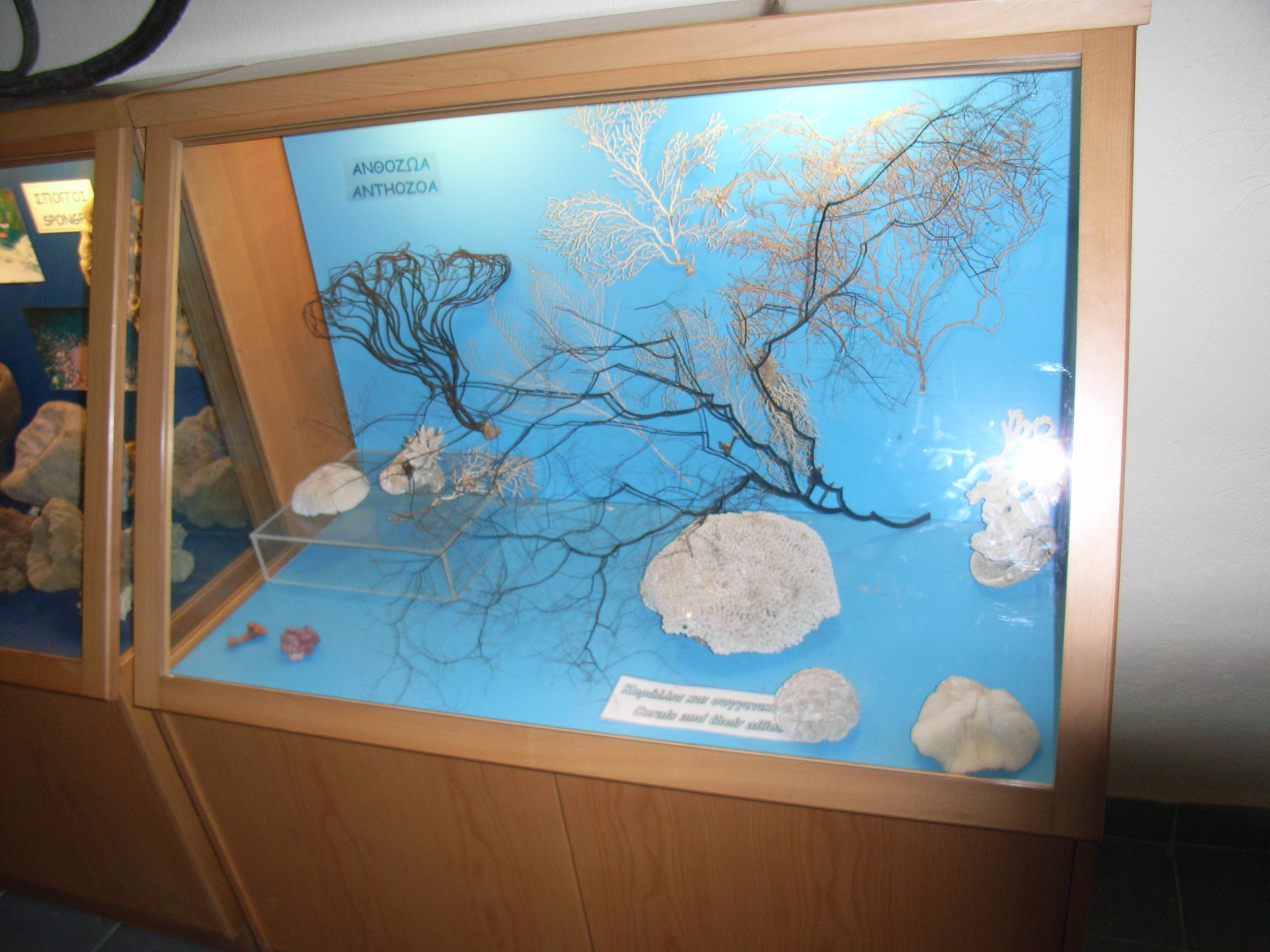
Anthozoa

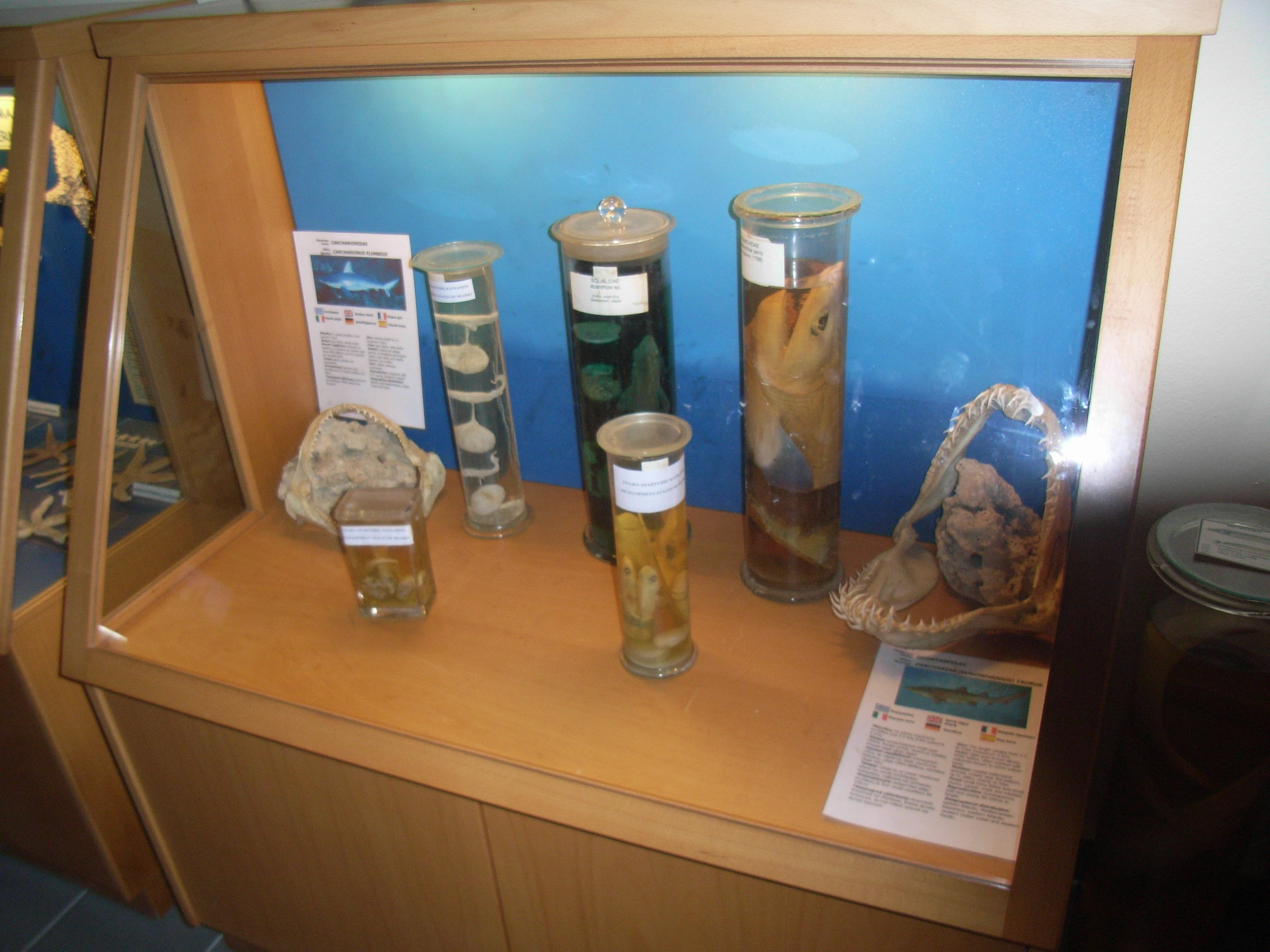
Shark ontogeny

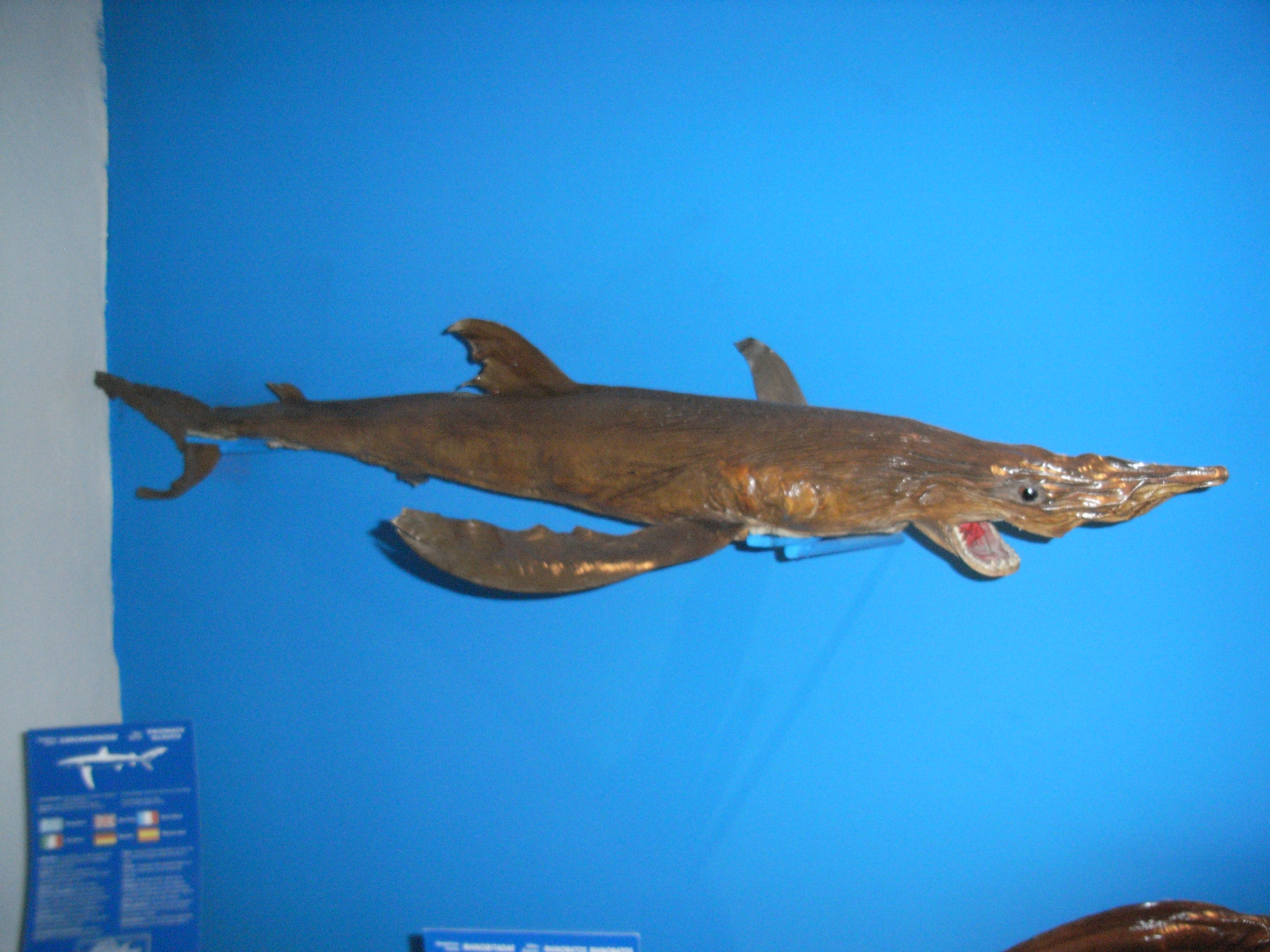
Prionace glauca

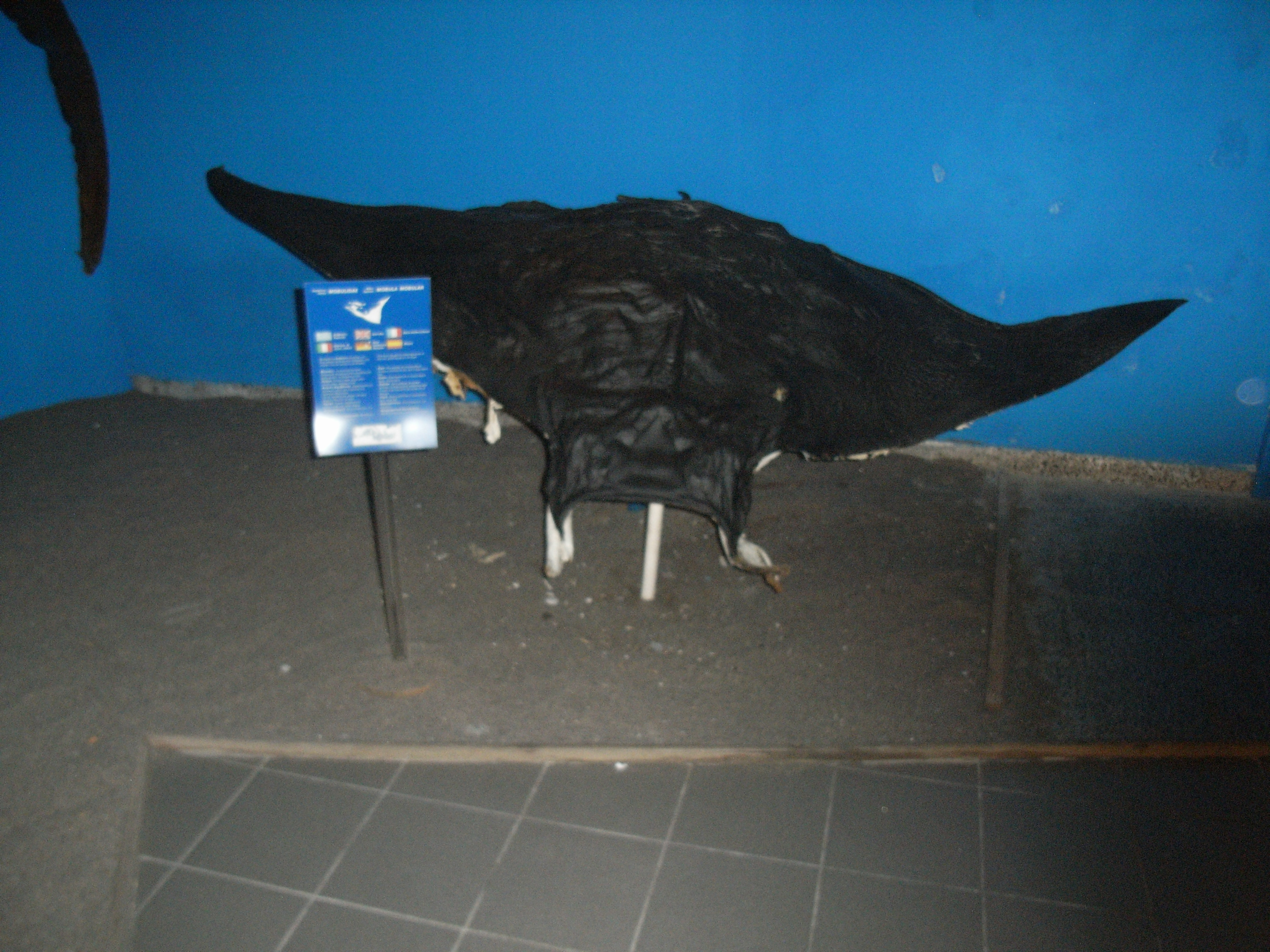
Mobula mobular

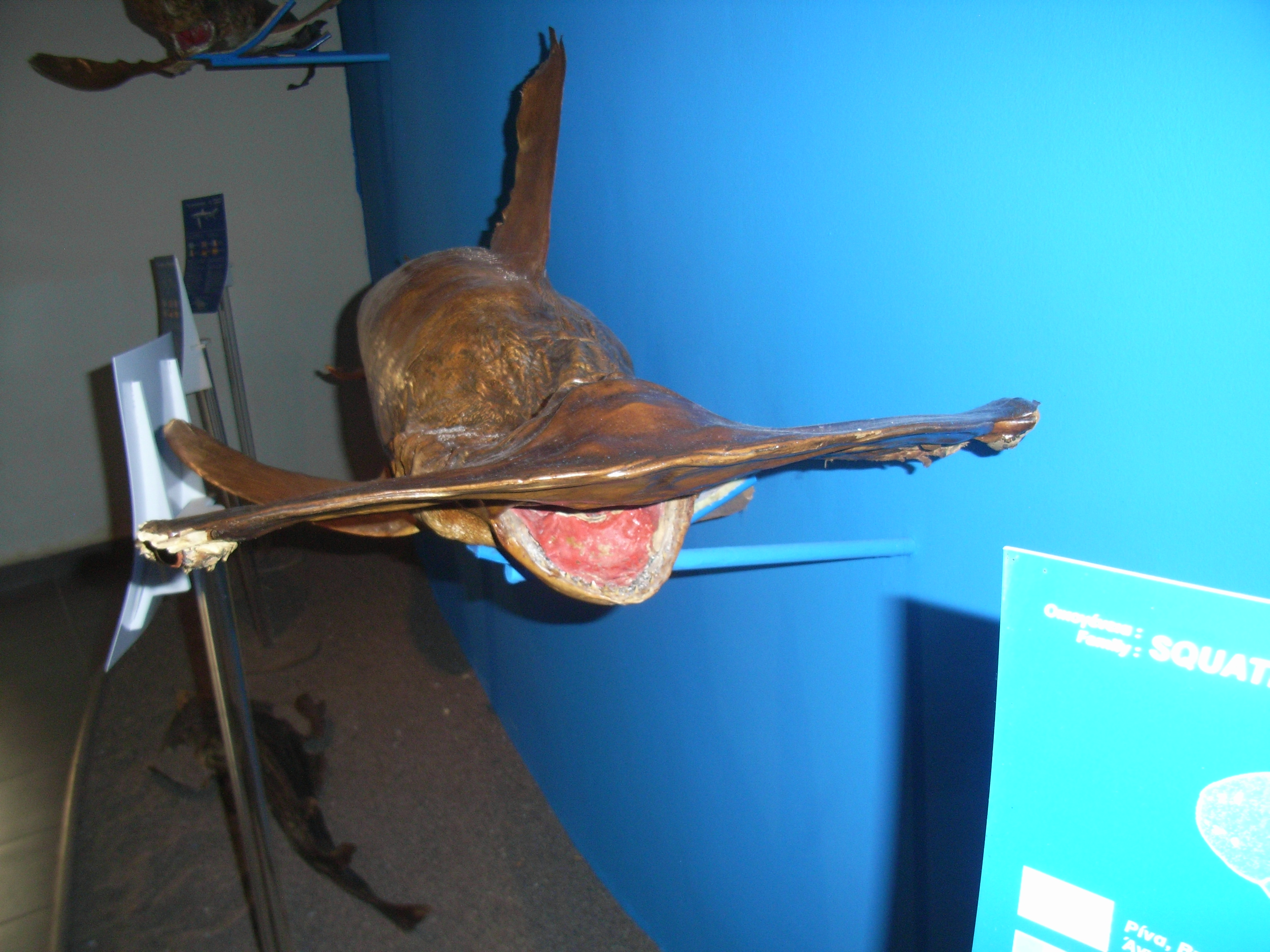
Sphyrna zygaena

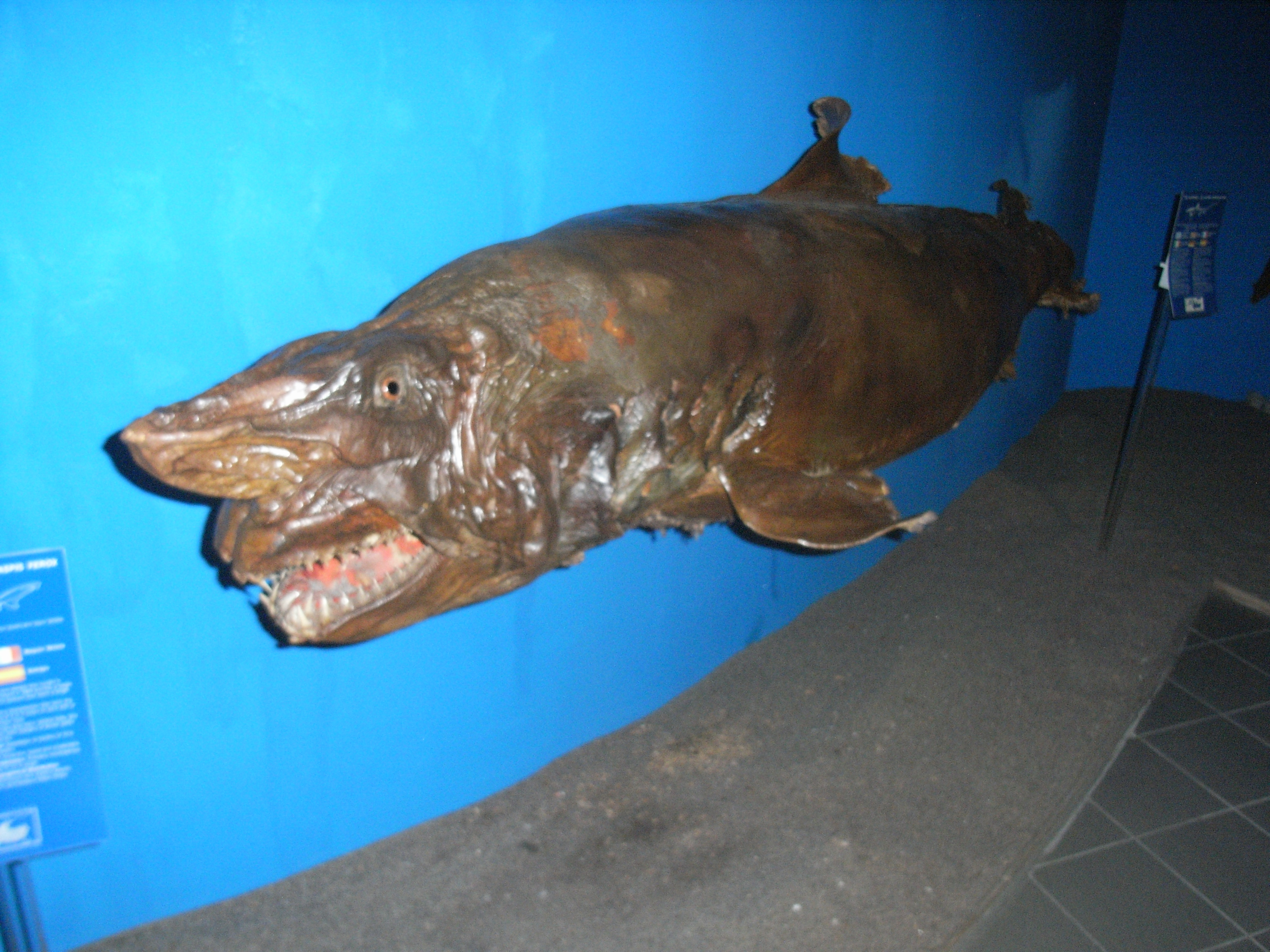
Odontaspis ferox
