= Gennaro Verolino =

Italian Roman Catholic bishop and diplomat

His Excellency, The Most Reverend Gennaro Verolino
- Titular Archbishop of Corinth
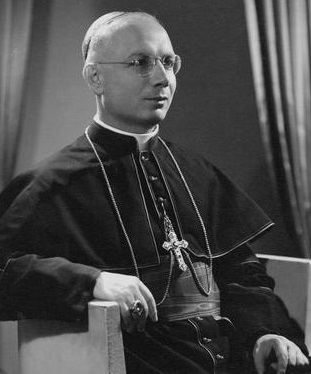
- Church: Catholic Church
- In office: 5 September 1951 – 17 November 2005
- Predecessor: Ettore Felici
- Successor: Vacant
- Previous posts: President of the Pontifical Commission for Sacred Archaeology (1969-1986); Official of the Secretariat of State (1967-1969); Prefect of the Congregation of Ceremonies (1963-1967); Apostolic Nuncio to Costa Rica (1957-1963); Apostolic Nuncio to Guatemala & El Salvador (1951-1957)

Orders
- Ordination: 23 December 1928 by Francesco De Pietro
- Consecration: 7 October 1951 by Clemente Micara, Paolo Giobbe and Nicola Capasso

Personal details
- Born: 3 November 1906 Naples, Kingdom of Italy
- Died: 17 November 2005 (aged 99) Rome
- Denomination: Roman Catholic

Styles of Gennaro Verolino
- Reference style: His Excellency; The Most Reverend
- Spoken style: Your Excellency
- Religious style: Archbishop

Gennaro Verolino (3 November 1906 – 17 November 2005) was an Italian Roman Catholic bishop and a diplomat for the Holy See.

== Life ==
Born in Naples, Verolino grew up in Acerra, his mother's birthplace, he studied at the seminary there and then at the Jesuit theological faculty in Naples. He was ordained a priest on 23 December 1928 in the private chapel of Francesco De Pietro, Bishop of Acerra. He was soon invited to Rome to study at the Apollinare, graduating in utroque iure and taking up a diplomatic career in the service of the Holy See.

As secretary of the apostolic nuncio Angelo Rotta, he lived in Hungary from 1944 onwards. At risk to his own life and with the support of Rotta and the consent of Pope Pius XII, Verolino saved over 30,000 Jews from the Holocaust by putting them under his diplomatic protection and supplying them with fake passports. For these actions he was the first winner of the Swedish Per Anger Prize in 2004. Yad Vashem also recognized him as Righteous Among the Nations in 2007. Due to an initially reluctant attitude to acknowledge his deeds, this process took several years and its recognition came only posthumous.

From February to November 1948, because the Internuncio Saverio Ritter was ill, he led the Nunciature as chargé d'affaires.

He was appointed titular archbishop of Corinth and Apostolic Nuncio to both El Salvador and Guatemala on 5 September 1951 by Pius XII. He was consecrated bishop by Cardinal Clemente Micara the following October.

On 25 February 1957 he was named Apostolic Nuncio to Costa Rica and on 2 March 1963 Secretary of the Sacred Ceremonial Congregation until its suppression in 1967 during Pope Paul VI's reform of the Roman Curia. He took part in all the sessions of the Second Vatican Council. He resigned from all his positions in 1986 because of age and died in Rome in 2005 at the age of 99. In 2007, he was buried in the episcopal chapel of Acerra cemetery.
