= Apostolic Nunciature to Colombia =

Diplomatic Mission of the Holy See in Colombia

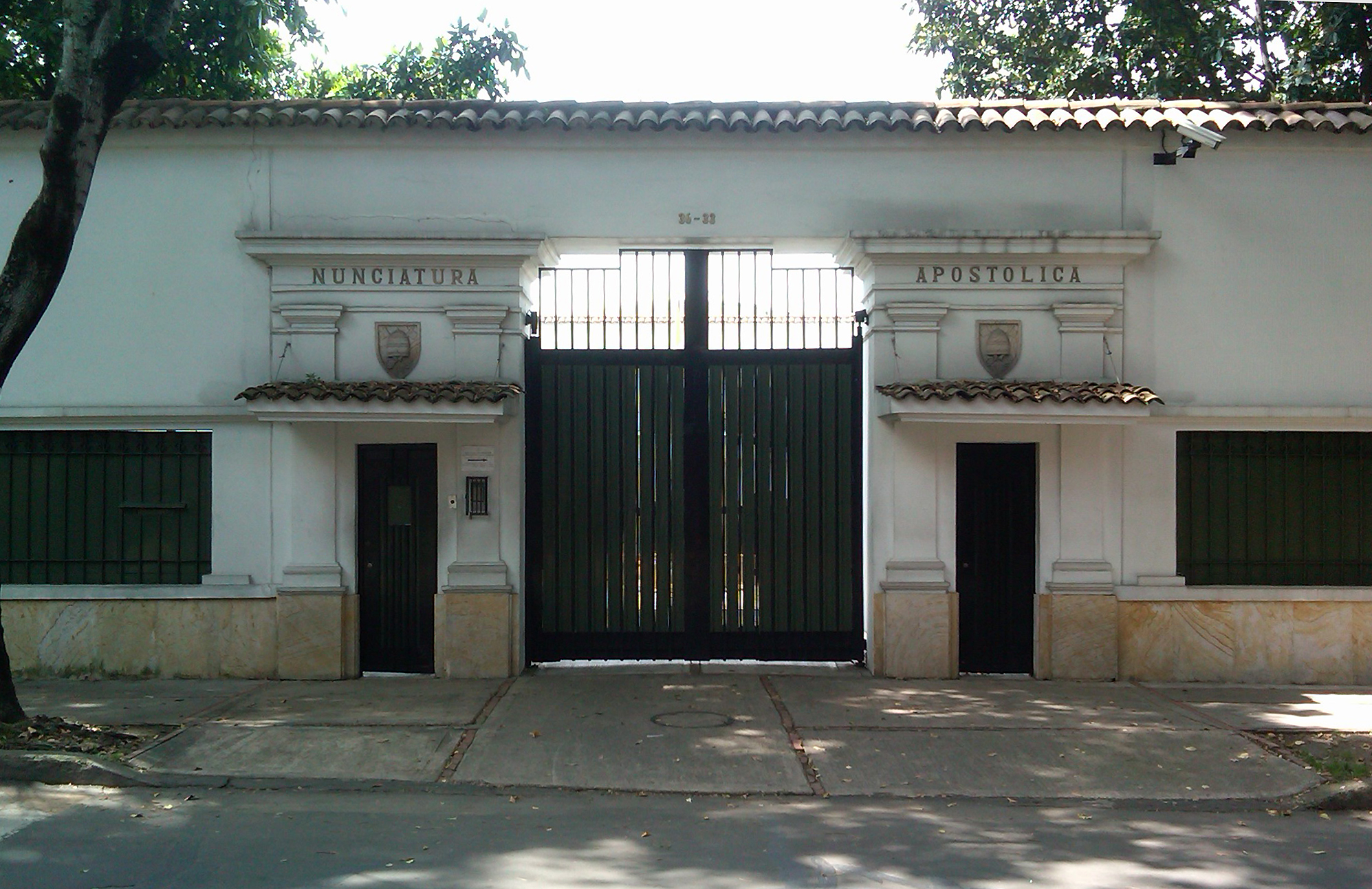
- Location: Bogotá, Colombia
- Address: Carrera 15 # 36-67 - Teusaquillo, Apartado Aéreo 3740, Bogotá, Colombia.
- Coordinates: 4.6254°N 74.0705°W
- Website: http://nunciatura.org.co/

The Apostolic Nunciature to Colombia the diplomatic mission of the Holy See to Colombia. It is located in Bogotá. The current Apostolic Nuncio is Archbishop Paolo Rudelli, who was named to the position by Pope Francis on 19 julio 2023.

The Apostolic Nunciature to the Republic of Colombia is an ecclesiastical office of the Catholic Church in Colombia, with the rank of an embassy. The nuncio serves both as the ambassador of the Holy See to the President of Colombia, and as delegate and point-of-contact between the Catholic hierarchy in Colombia and the Pope.

== Papal representatives to Colombia ==
Apostolic Delegates

- Gaetano Baluffi (9 September 1836 - 30 June 1842)
- Lorenzo Barili (26 May 1851 - 17 June 1856)
- Mieczyslaw Halka Ledóchowski (17 June 1856 - 25 July 1861)
- Giovanni Battista Agnozzi (24 March 1882 - 1887)
- Luigi Matera (17 May 1887 - 1 August 1890)
- Antonio Sabatucci (21 September 1890 - 31 December 1895)
- Antonio Vico (24 November 1897 - 4 February 1904)
- Francesco Ragonesi (7 September 1904 - 9 February 1913)
- Carlo Montagnini (10 February 1913 - 24 October 1913 Died)
- Alberto Vassallo-Torregrossa (25 November 1913 - 29 August 1915)
- Enrico Gasparri (14 November 1915 - 1 September 1920)

Apostolic Nuncios

- Roberto Vicentini (18 May 1922 - 28 October 1924)
- Paolo Giobbe (20 March 1925 - 13 June 1935)
- Carlo Serena (4 July 1935 - 22 October 1945)
- Giuseppe Beltrami (3 or 15 November 1945 – 4 October 1950)
- Antonio Samoré (30 January 1950 – 7 February 1953)
- Paolo Bertoli (7 May 1953 – 15 April 1959)
- Giuseppe Paupini (23 May 1959 – 1969)
- Angelo Palmas (19 April 1969 – 2 September 1975)
- Eduardo Martínez Somalo (12 November 1975 – 5 May 1979)
- Angelo Acerbi (14 August 1979 – 28 March 1990)
- Paolo Romeo (24 April 1990 – 5 February 1999)
- Beniamino Stella (11 February 1999 – 13 October 2007)
- Aldo Cavalli (29 October 2007 – 16 February 2013)
- Ettore Balestrero (22 February 2013 - 6 July 2018)
- Luis Mariano Montemayor (27 September 2018 – 25 February 2023)
- Paolo Rudelli (19 July 2023 – 30 March 2026)
- Angelo Accattino (15 August 2026 – present)
