= Rodolfo Petracco =

Italian architect

Rodolfo Petracco (Trieste, 1889 – Foggia, 1961) was an Italian architect.

== Life and career ==
He was born in Trieste in 1889. After graduating, he moved to the Dodecanese, which had been an Italian possession since 1912. Together with Florestano Di Fausto and Armando Bernabiti he designed numerous public and private buildings in a mostly Rationalist style, though with strong influence from local vernacular architecture. His most ambitious work was the foundation of the city of Portolago in Leros, designed from scratch together with Bernabiti. Described as "the only truly rationalist town outside of Italy", their work on Portolago has been praised for its beauty, imagination and inclusivist nature.

In Rhodes, he designed the Palace of Justice and the Church of San Giovanni (today, Evangelismos church). In Kos, he designed the Archaeological Museum and Market.

After the War, he settled in Foggia where he died in 1961.
