= Archdiocese of Rhodes =

Latin Catholic ecclesiastical jurisdiction in Greece

Coordinates: 36.4437°N 28.2270°E

Archdiocese of Rhodes Archidioecesis Rhodiensis Αρχιεπισκοπή Ρόδου

Catholic

Location
- Country: Greece
- Metropolitan: Immediately exempt to the Holy See

Statistics
- Area: 2,714 km^{2} (1,048 sq mi)
- Population: Total; Catholics: (as of 2010); 150,000; 2,000 (1.3%)

Information
- Denomination: Catholic Church
- Sui iuris church: Latin Church
- Rite: Roman Rite
- Established: 28 March 1928
- Cathedral: Cathedral of St Francis of Assisi

Current leadership
- Pope: Leo XIV
- Bishop: Sede vacante
- Apostolic Administrator: Theodoros Kontidis, S.J.

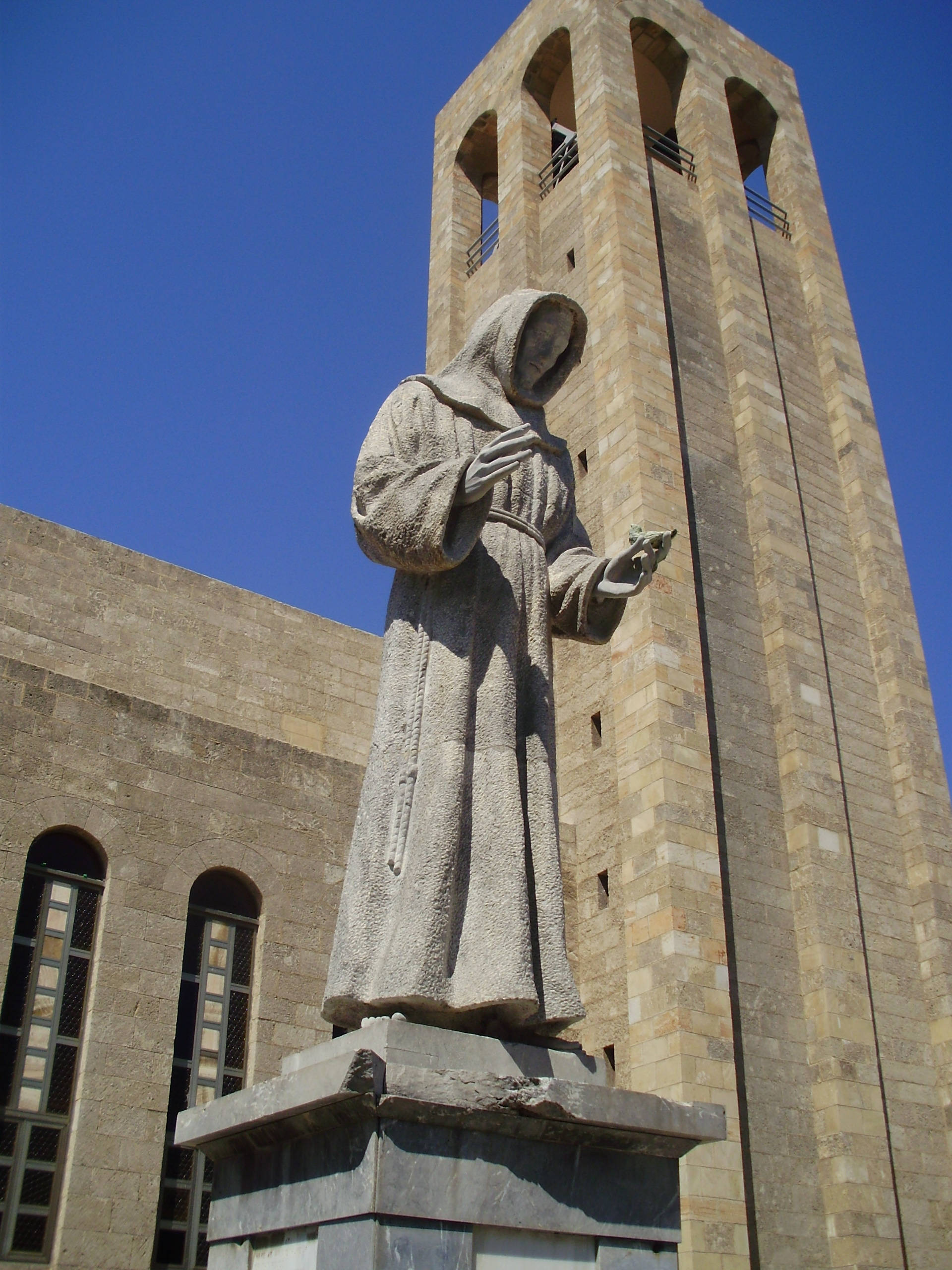
St. Francis of Assisi in Rhodes.

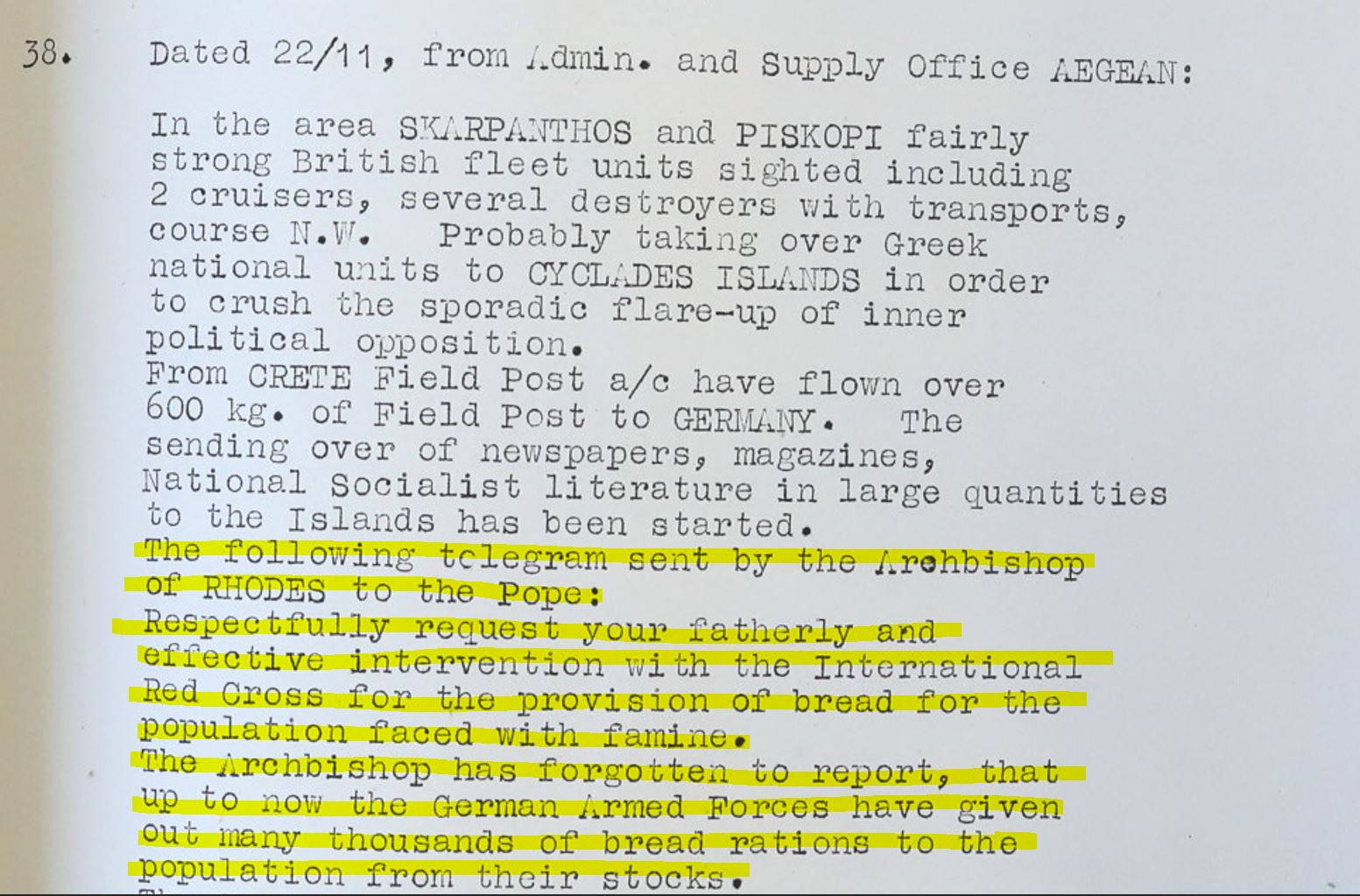
Message captured by Allied ULTRA mentioning the Archbishop of Rhodes on 22 November 1944

The Archdiocese of Rhodes (Latin: Archidioecesis Rhodiensis) is a Latin Church ecclesiastical territory or archdiocese of the Catholic Church in Greece. The archdiocese is directly exempt to the Holy See and not part of an ecclesiastical province. It was at various times a titular see and later a metropolitan see. It has its cathedra within St. Francis of Assisi Cathedral in the eponymous capital of the island of Rhodes.

One former cathedral of "Our Lady of the Castle" was turned into a mosque during the Ottoman period and is now a museum, the other former cathedral of St. John was turned into a Greek Orthodox church.

== History ==
An ancient diocese was established in Rhodes around 200 AD and promoted to Metropolitan Archdiocese around 400 AD. It continues as the Greek Orthodox Metropolis of Rhodes.

A Catholic see was established on the island when it became the seat of the Knights Hospitaller in 1308 following their conquest of Rhodes. In 1523, with the fall of the island to the Ottoman Empire, it was suppressed as a residential diocese but turned into a titular see.

On March 28, 1928, it was restored as non-metropolitan, exempt Archdiocese of Rhodos on the territory of the suppressed Apostolic Prefecture of Rhodes and adjacent islands.

== Episcopal ordinaries ==
=== Metropolitan Archbishops of Rhodes ===
- Belijan (? – 1324-09-26), later Metropolitan Archbishop of Salona (Croatia) (1324-09-26 – 1328-01-28)
- Ugo de Scuria, Friars Minor (O.F.M.) (1351-06-20 – 1361-12-15), later Metropolitan Archbishop of Ragusa (Croatia) (1361-12-15 – 1370-07-12), finally Archbishop-Bishop of Ostuni (Italy) (1370.07.12 – death 1374)

=== Titular Archbishop of Rhodes ===
- Francesco Niccolini, (1685-09-10 – 1692-02-04)

=== Exempt Archbishop of Rhodes ===
- Archbishop Florido Ambrogio Acciari, Friars Minor (O.F.M.) as Apostolic Administrator (1928–1929)
- Giovanni Maria Emilio Castellani, O.F.M. (1929-01-15 – 1937-03-25)
- Friar Pier Crisologo Fabi, O.F.M. as Apostolic Administrator (1937–1938)
- Florido Ambrogio Acciari, O.F.M. (1938-03-30 – 1970-03-10)
- Friar Michail-Petros Franzidis, O.F.M. as Apostolic Administrator (1970–1992)
- Archbishop Nikolaos Foskolos as Apostolic Administrator (1992–2014)
- Sevastianos Rossolatos as Apostolic Administrator (12 August 2014 – 14 July 2021)
- Theodoros Kontidis, S.J. as Apostolic Administrator (14 July 2021 – present)

== See also ==
- Roman Catholicism in Greece
- Panagia tou Kastrou
