= Paolo Giobbe =

Italian Cardinal

- Cardinal of the Holy Roman Church
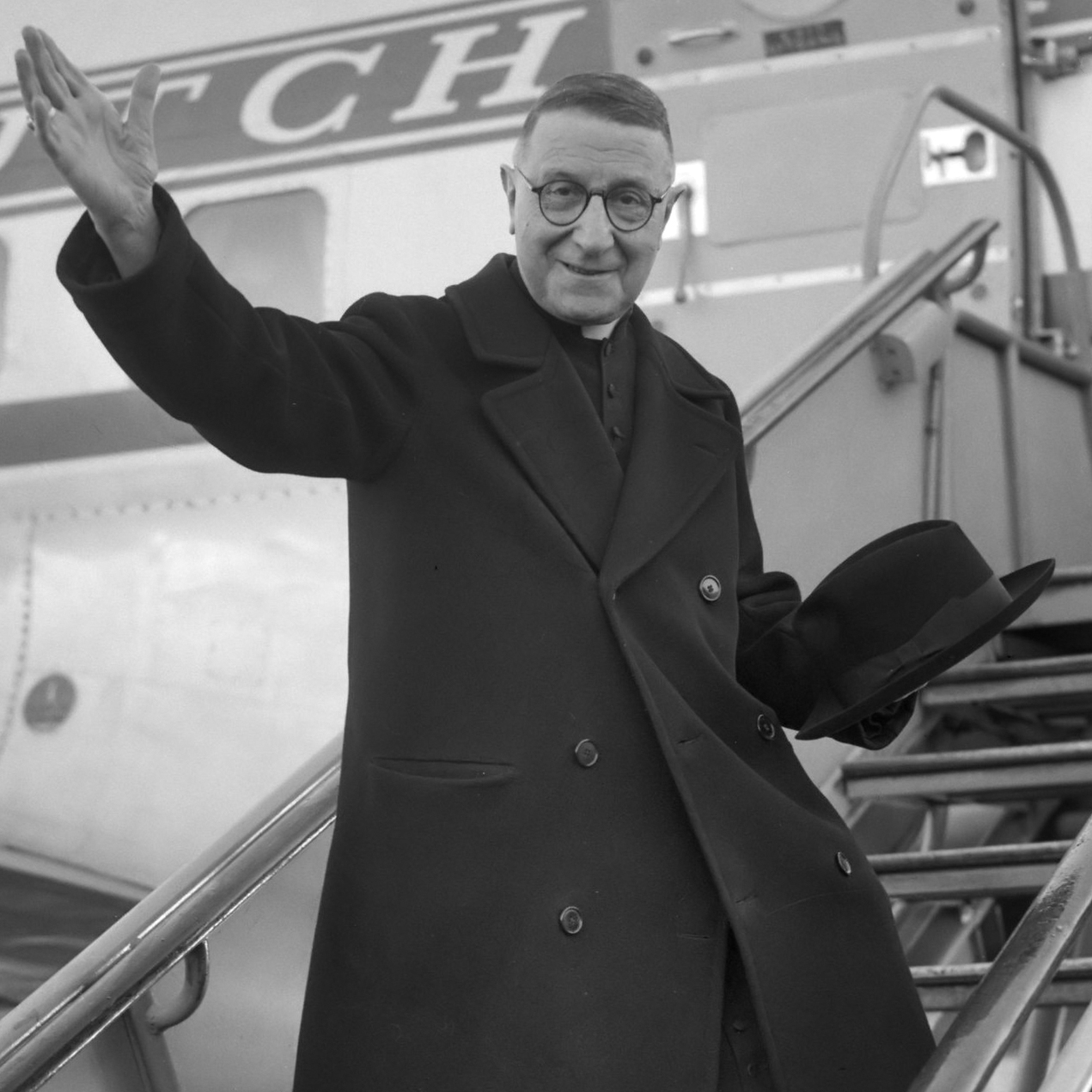
- Paolo Giobbe in 1958
- Church: Catholic Church
- See: Santa Maria in Vallicella
- In office: 18 December 1958 – 14 August 1972
- Predecessor: Francesco Borgongini Duca
- Successor: James Knox
- Other post: Patron of the Sovereign Military Hospitaller Order of Saint John of Jerusalem, of Rhodes and of Malta (1961-1972)
- Previous posts: Datary of the Apostolic Dataria (1959-1968); Apostolic Internuncio to the Netherlands (1935-1958); Titular Archbishop of Ptolemais in Thebaide (1925-1958); Apostolic Nuncio to Colombia (1925-1935)

Orders
- Ordination: 4 December 1904
- Consecration: 26 April 1925 by Pietro Gasparri
- Created cardinal: 15 December 1958 by Pope John XXIII

Personal details
- Born: 10 January 1880 Rome, Kingdom of Italy
- Died: 14 August 1972 (aged 92) Rome, Italy

Paolo Giobbe (10 January 1880 – 14 August 1972) was an Italian cardinal of the Catholic Church who served as Papal Datary in the Roman Curia from 1959 to 1968, and was elevated to the cardinalate in 1958 as Cardinal-Priest of Santa Maria in Vallicella.

He participated in the conclave of 1963, which elected Pope Paul VI. Lost his right to participate in the conclave by being older than eighty years, January 1, 1971.

Catholic Church titles
Preceded by Enrico Gasparri	Apostolic Nuncio to Colombia; 1925–1935	Succeeded by Giuseppe Beltrami
Preceded by Cesare Orsenigo	Nuncio to the Netherlands; 1935–1959	Succeeded by Giuseppe Beltrami
Preceded by Federico Tedeschini	Papal Datary; 1959–1968	Succeeded by none
Records
Preceded by Benedetto Aloisi Masella	Oldest living Member of the Sacred College; 30 September 1970 – 14 August 1972	Succeeded by José da Costa
