= Paolo Bertoli =

Italian cardinal (1908–2001)

His Eminence Paolo Bertoli
- Prefect Emeritus of the Congregation for the Causes of Saints
- Church: Roman Catholic Church
- Appointed: 7 May 1969
- Term ended: 1 March 1973
- Predecessor: Benno Walter Gut
- Successor: Luigi Raimondi
- Other post: Cardinal-Bishop of Frascati (1979–2001)
- Previous posts: Apostolic Administrator of Constantinople (1952–53); Apostolic Delegate to Turkey (1952–53); Titular Archbishop of Nicomedia (1952–69); Apostolic Nuncio to Colombia (1953–59); Apostolic Nuncio to Lebanon (1959–60); Apostolic Nuncio to France (1960–69); Cardinal-Deacon of San Girolamo della Carità (1969–73); Cardinal-Priest of San Girolamo dei Croati (1973–79); Camerlengo of the Apostolic Camera (1979–85)

Orders
- Ordination: 15 August 1930 by Giuseppe Bertazzoni
- Consecration: 11 May 1952 by Eugène Tisserant
- Created cardinal: 28 April 1969 by Pope Paul VI
- Rank: Cardinal-Deacon (1969–73); Cardinal-Priest (1973–79); Cardinal-Bishop (1979–2001)

Personal details
- Born: Paolo Bertoli; 1 February 1908 Poggio Garfagnana, Kingdom of Italy
- Died: 8 November 2001 (aged 93) Rome, Italy
- Parents: Carlo Bertoli; Aride Poli
- Education: Pontifical Major Roman Seminary; Pontifical Roman Athenaeum S. Apollinare
- Motto: Fide tutior
- Coat of arms

Styles of Paolo Bertoli
- Reference style: His Eminence
- Spoken style: Your Eminence
- Informal style: Cardinal
- See: Frascati (suburbicarian see)

Paolo Bertoli (1 February 1908 – 8 November 2001) was an Italian Roman Catholic cardinal and prefect of the Congregation for the Causes of Saints.

== Early life ==
Paolo Bertoli was born in Poggio Garfagnana in Italy. He was educated at the Seminary of Lucca and later at the Pontifical Roman Seminary in Rome, where he earned doctorates in philosophy and theology. He carried on his studies at the Pontifical Roman Athenaeum "S. Apollinare", where he earned a doctorate in utroque iure (in both canon and civil law).

== Priest ==
He was ordained on 15 August 1930 in Lucca. From 1930 until 1933, he studied further. From 1933 until 1938, he served as an attaché of the nunciature in Yugoslavia. He was created Privy chamberlain of His Holiness in 1934. He was an Auditor of the nunciature in France between 1938 and 1942. He was raised to the level of domestic prelate of His Holiness in 1946. He was the papal representative to an international conference to solve the problems caused by the Second World War in Bern, Switzerland, in 1946. He was chargé d'affaires of the nunciature in Czechoslovakia for 1949 but was unable to hold the post for political reasons.

== Bishop ==
Pope Pius XII appointed him titular Archbishop of Nicomedia on 24 March 1952 and then named him apostolic delegate to Turkey two days later. He was consecrated a bishop on 11 May 1952 by Eugène Tisserant, then Dean of the College of Cardinals. He was appointed Apostolic Nuncio to Colombia on 7 May 1953.

He was named Apostolic Nuncio to Lebanon on 16 April 1959 and Apostolic Nuncio to France on 16 April 1960. He attended the Second Vatican Council.

== Cardinal ==
He was created cardinal deacon of San Girolamo della Carità in the consistory of 28 April 1969. Pope Paul VI appointed him prefect of the Congregation for the Causes of Saints on 7 May 1969. He remained as prefect until he resigned on 1 March 1973. He was raised to the order of cardinal priests and exchanged his deaconry for the title of S. Girolamo degli Schiavoni on 5 March 1973. He took part in the 1978 conclaves that elected Pope John Paul I and Pope John Paul II in August and October. Pope John Paul named him camerlengo of the Holy Roman Church. He was elevated to the rank of cardinal bishop of the suburbicarian see of Frascati on 30 June 1979. He resigned the post of camerlengo on 25 March 1985.

Catholic Church titles
Preceded by Benno Gut	Prefect of the Congregation for the Causes of Saints; 7 May 1969 – 1 March 1973	Succeeded by Luigi Raimondi
Preceded by Jean-Marie Villot	Camerlengo of the Holy Roman Church; 5 May 1979 – 25 March 1985	Succeeded by Sebastiano Baggio
Preceded by Jean-Marie Villot	Cardinal-Bishop of Frascati; 30 June 1979 – 8 November 2001	Succeeded by Alfonso López Trujillo
