= Modern Greek architecture =

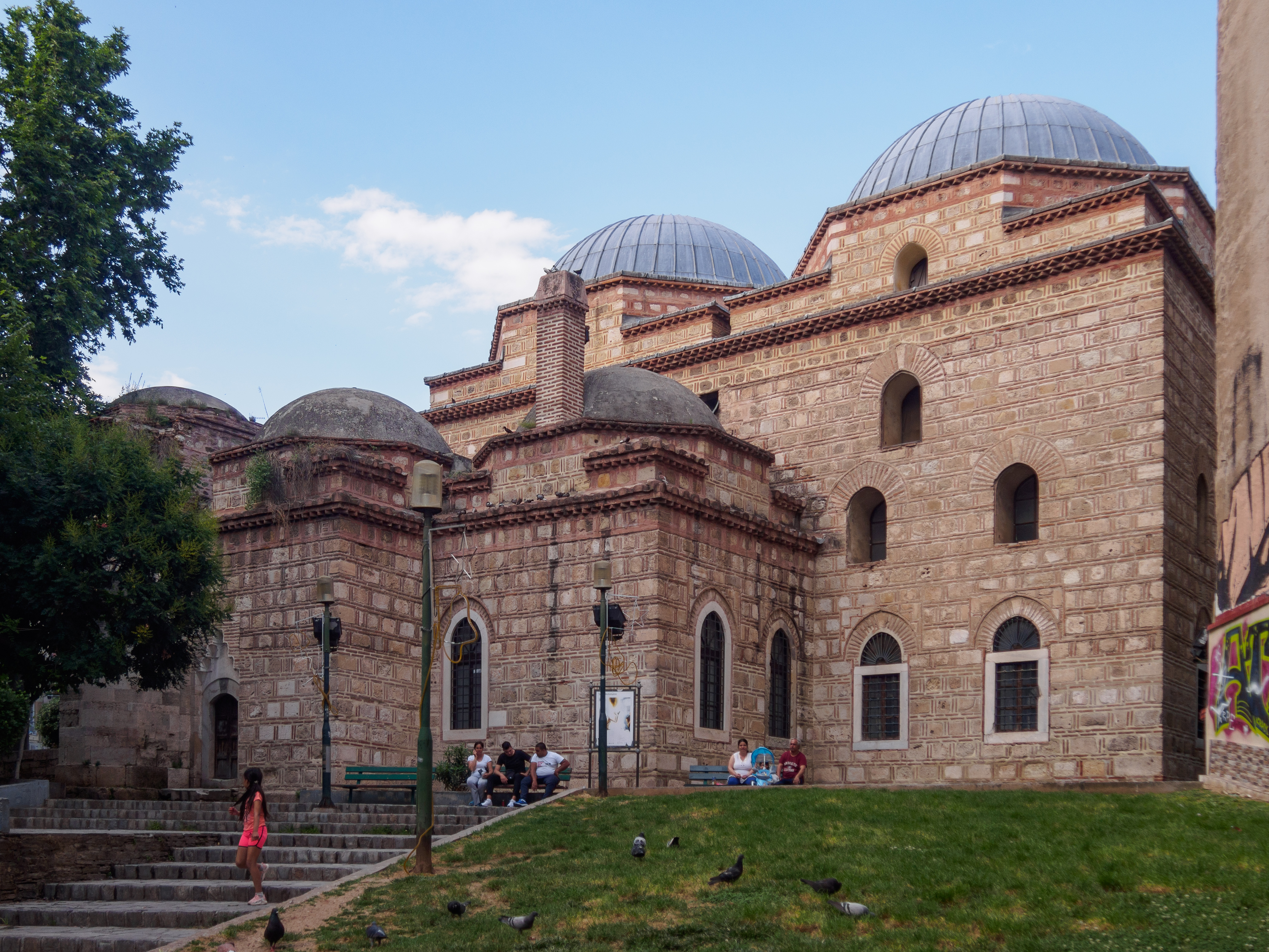
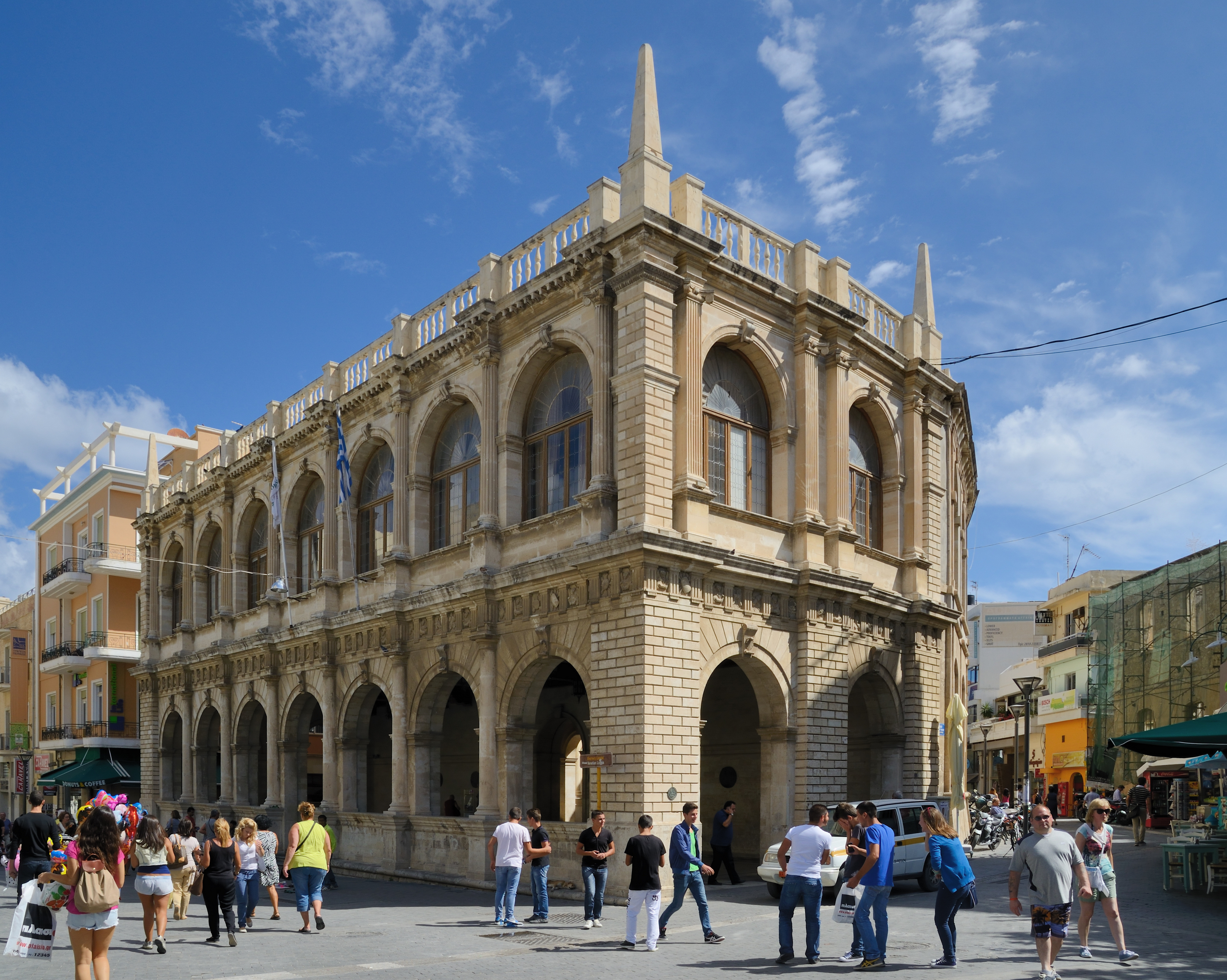
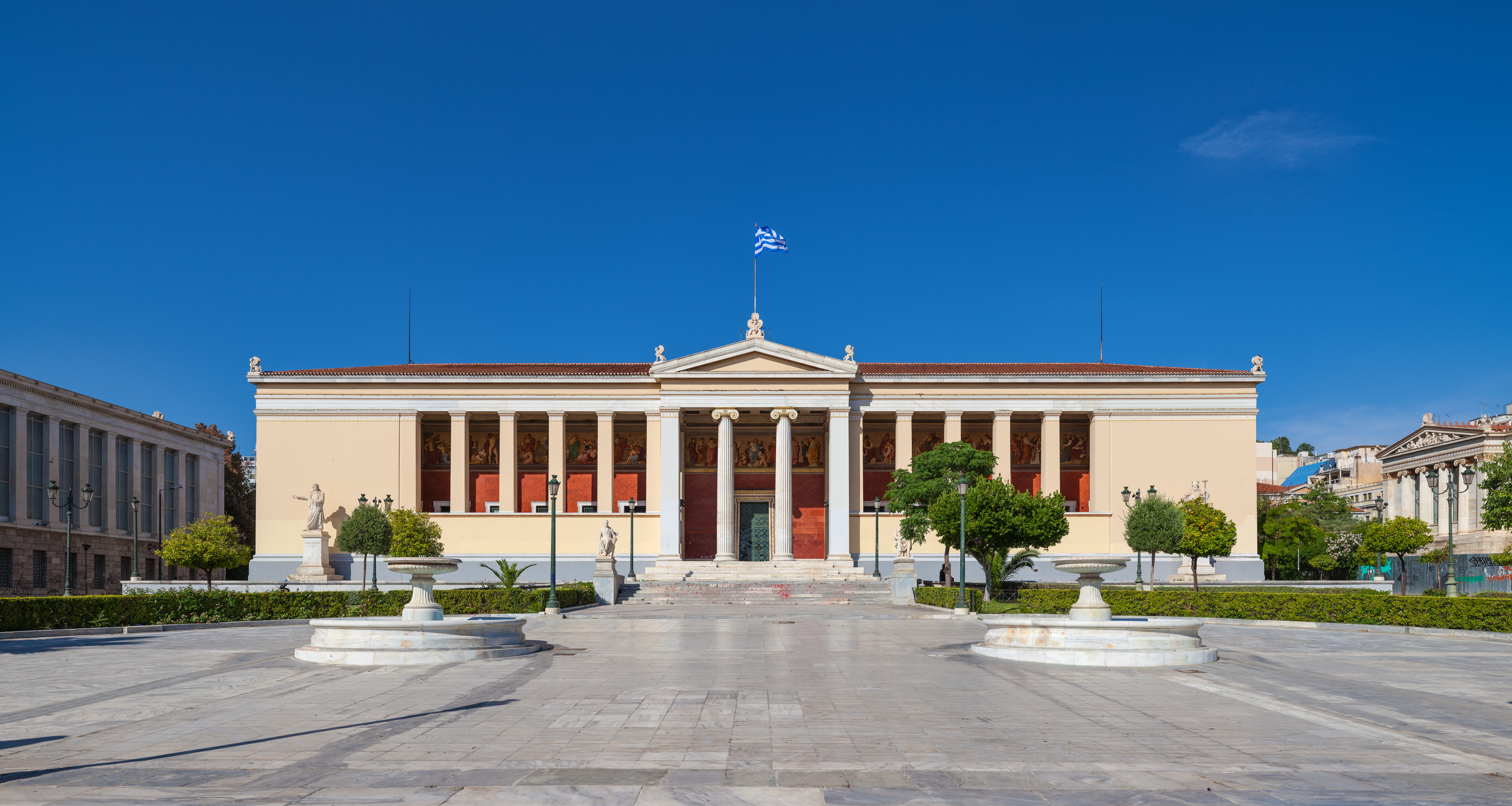
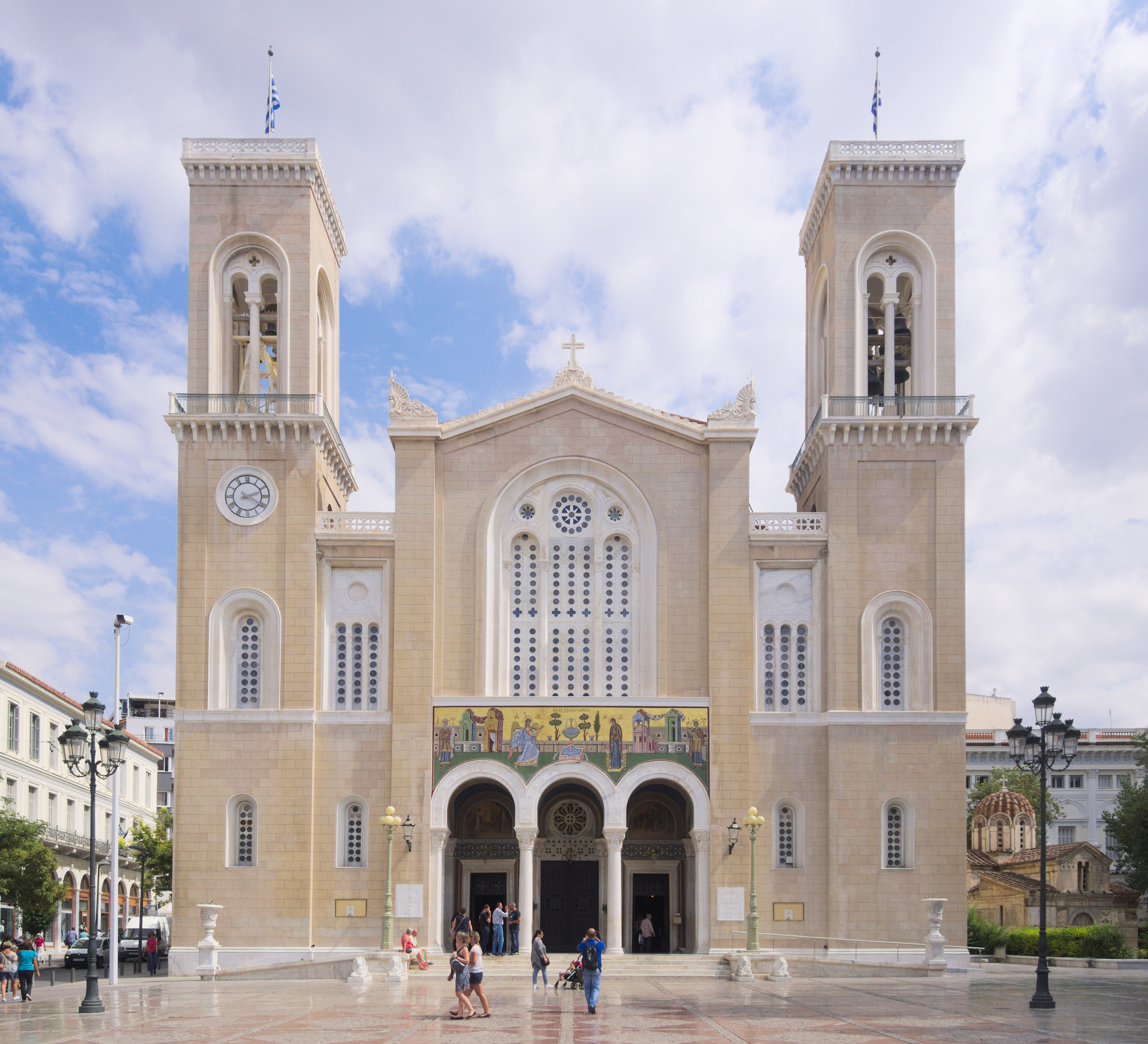
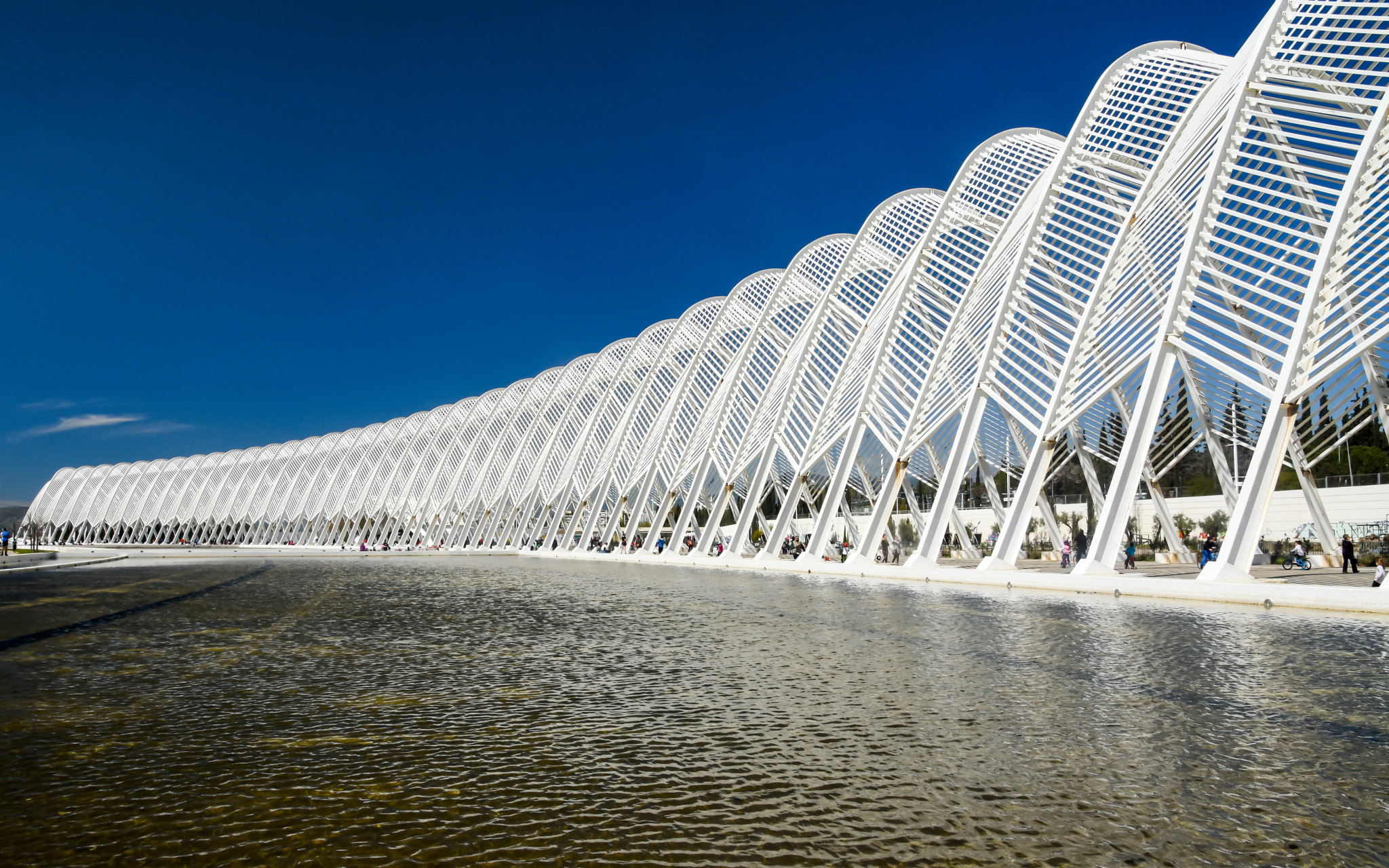
Alaca Imaret Mosque in Thessaloniki (1480s), Venetian Loggia in Heraklion (17th century), University of Athens (1859), Metropolitan Cathedral of Athens (1862), Embassy of the United States in Athens (1961), and a Athens Olympic Sports Complex (2004)

After the Fall of Constantinople to the Ottomans and the following trends of Greek migration to the Diaspora, Greek architecture was concentrated mainly on the Greek Orthodox churches of the Diaspora. These churches, such as other intellectual centres built by Greeks (foundations, schools, etc.), were used also as a meeting-place. The architectural style of these buildings was heavily influenced by the western European architecture.

After the Greek War of Independence and the creation of the modern Greek state, the modern Greek architecture tried to combine the traditional Greek architecture and Greek elements and motives with the western European movements and styles.

The 19th-century architecture of Athens and other cities of the Greek Kingdom is mostly influenced by the Neoclassical architecture, with architects such as Theophil Hansen, Ernst Ziller, Panagis Kalkos, Lysandros Kaftanzoglou and Stamatios Kleanthis.

== History ==
=== Venetian and Ottoman architecture ===
The architecture of the modern Greek cities, especially the old centres ("old towns") is mostly influenced either by the Ottoman or the Venetian architecture, two forces that dominated the Greek space from the early modern period. The most notable examples of Gothic architecture in modern-day Greece include the former Dominican church of St. Peter in Heraklion and the Palace of the Grand Master of the Knights of Rhodes in Rhodes, whilst the Venetian Loggia in Heraklion is a prime example of Renaissance architecture. Ottoman architecture is represented by the Alaca Imaret Mosque in Thessaloniki, the former Tzistarakis Mosque in Athens, and the Saint Titus Cathedral in Heraklion.

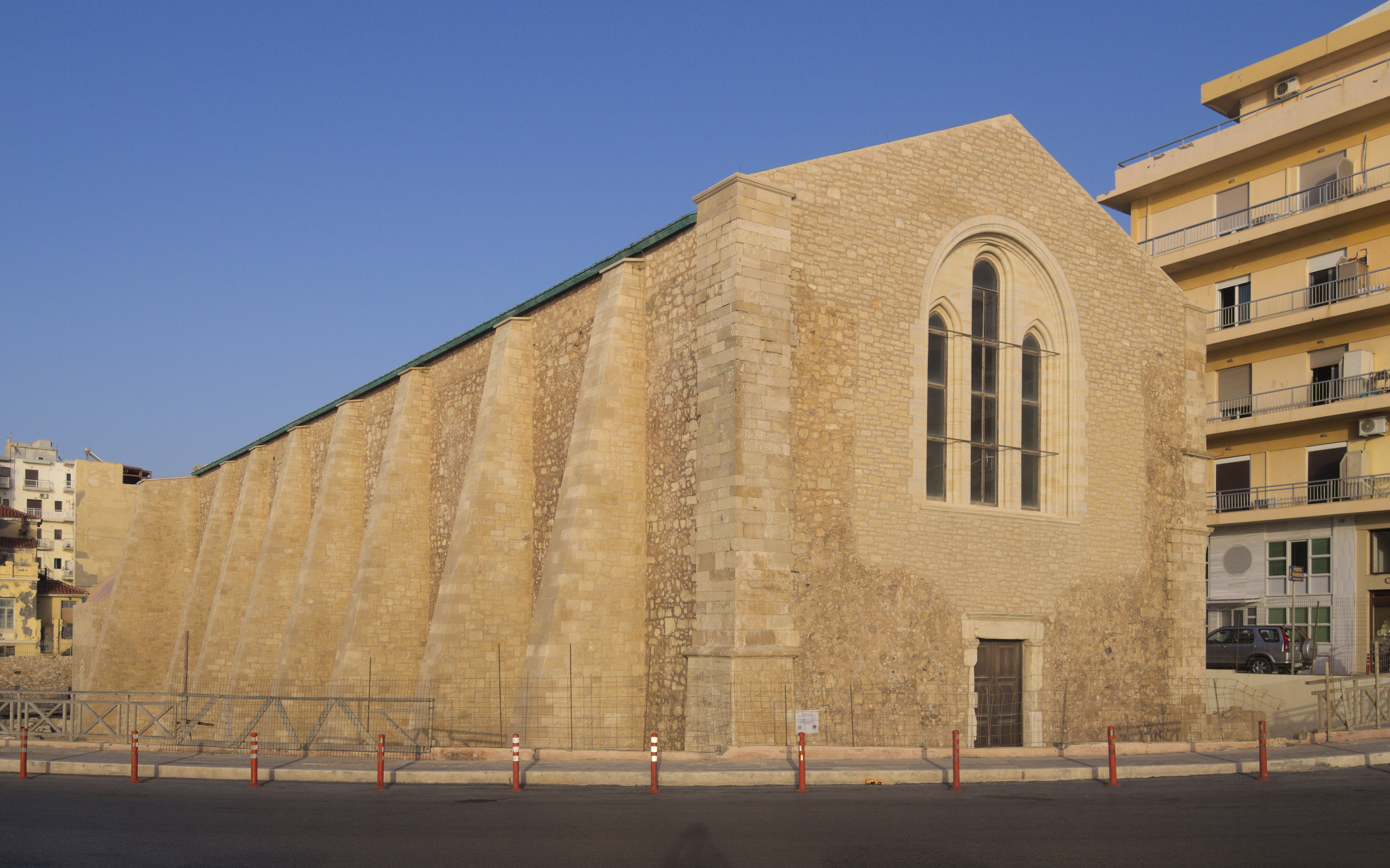
Former Dominican church of St. Peter in Heraklion (13th century)

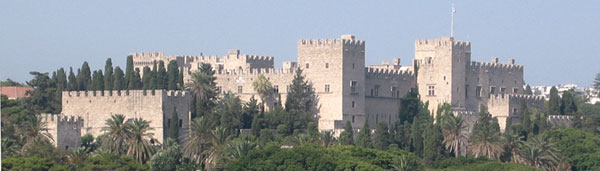
Palace of the Grand Master of the Knights of Rhodes in Rhodes (14th century)

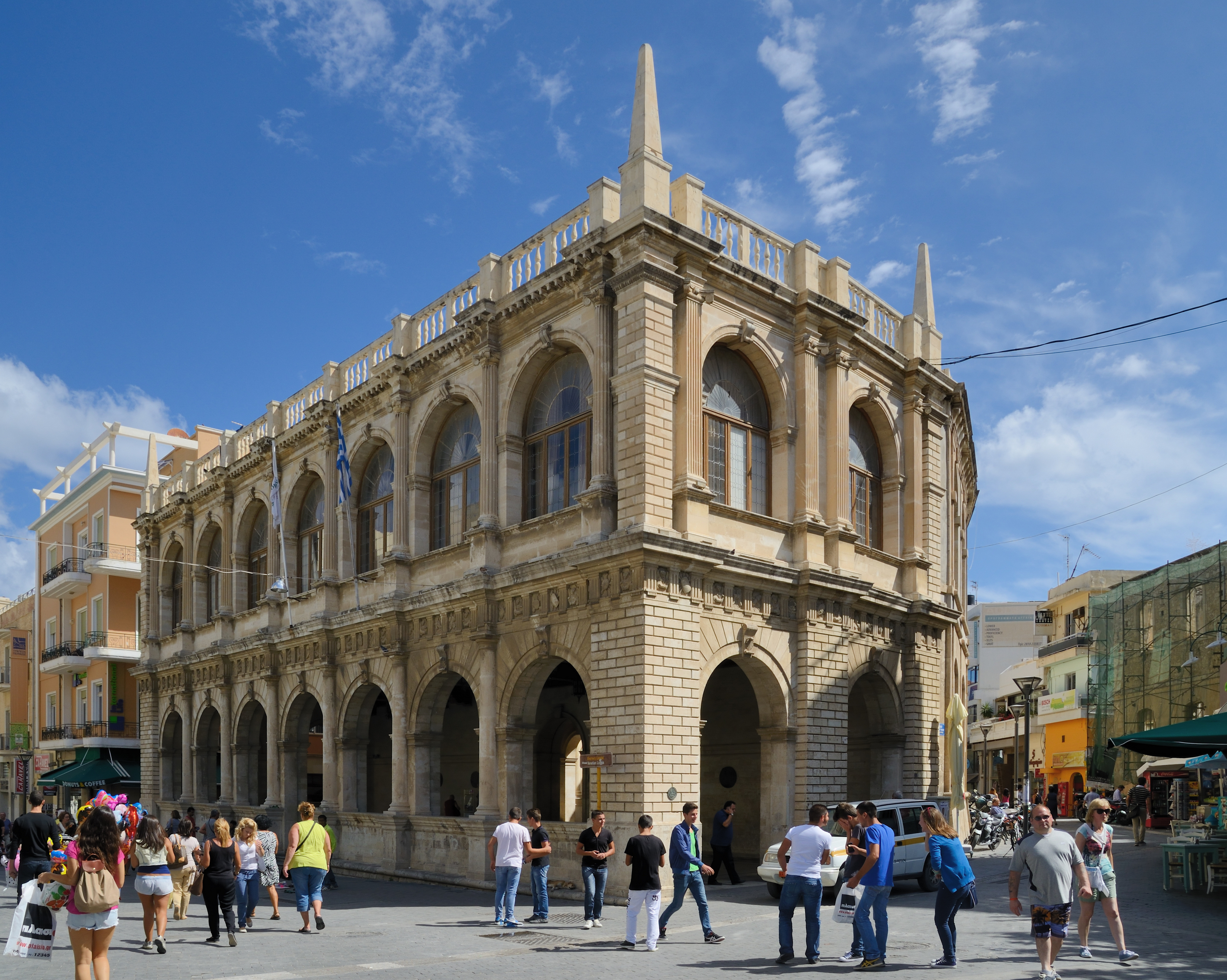
Venetian Loggia in Heraklion (17th century)

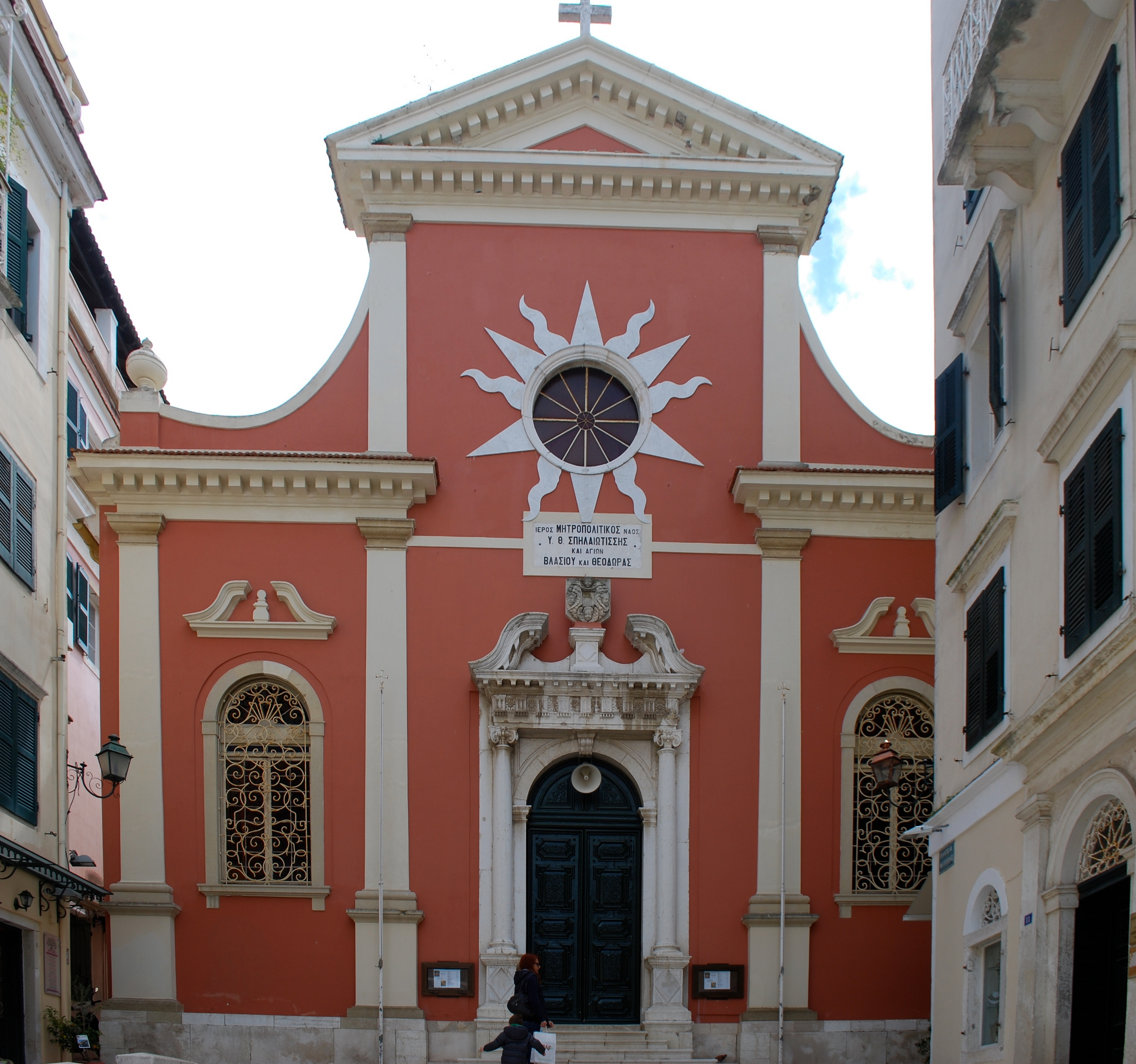
Metropolitan Cathedral of Panagia Spilaiotissa in Corfu (18th century)

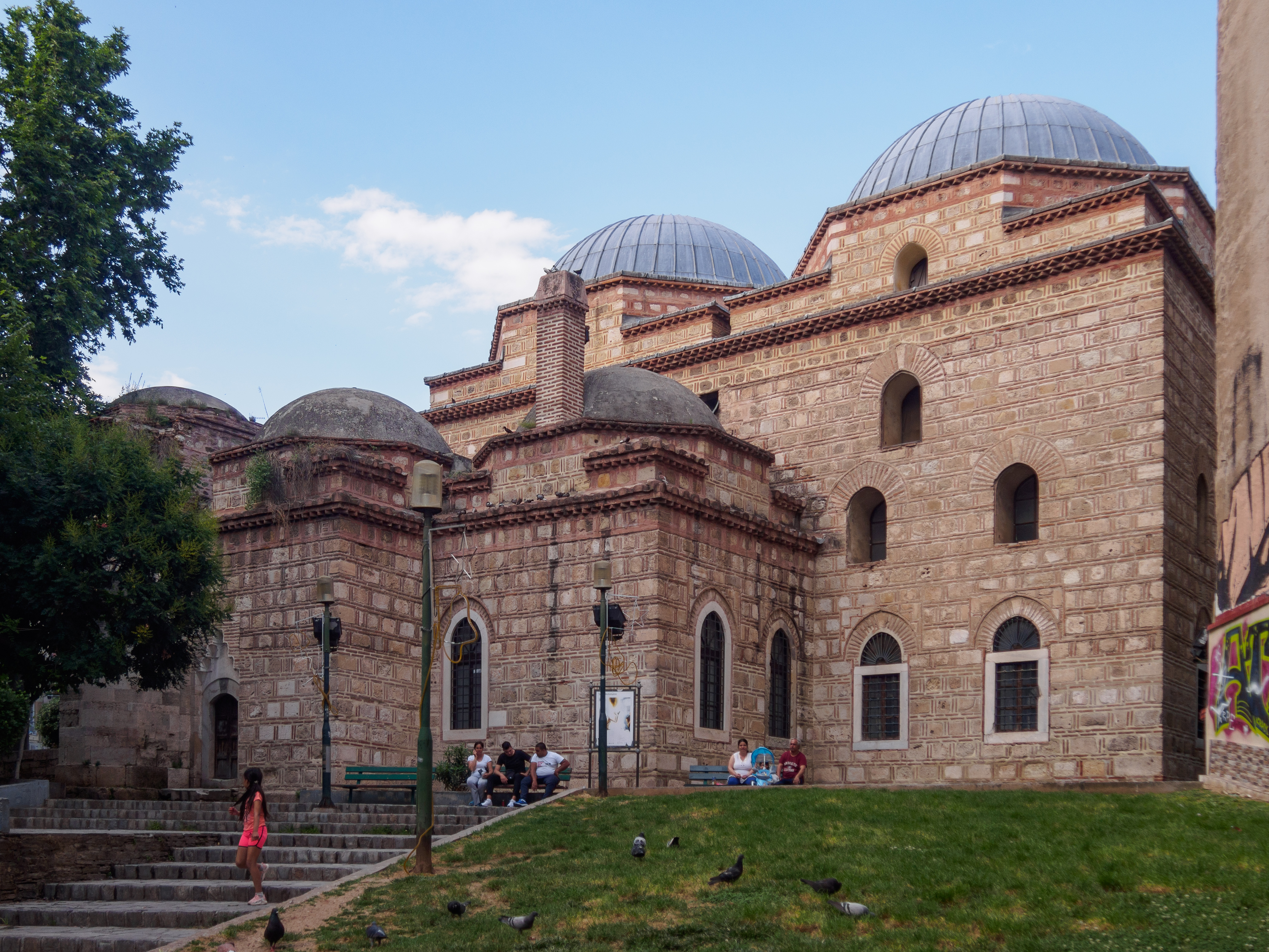
Alaca Imaret Mosque in Thessaloniki (1480s)

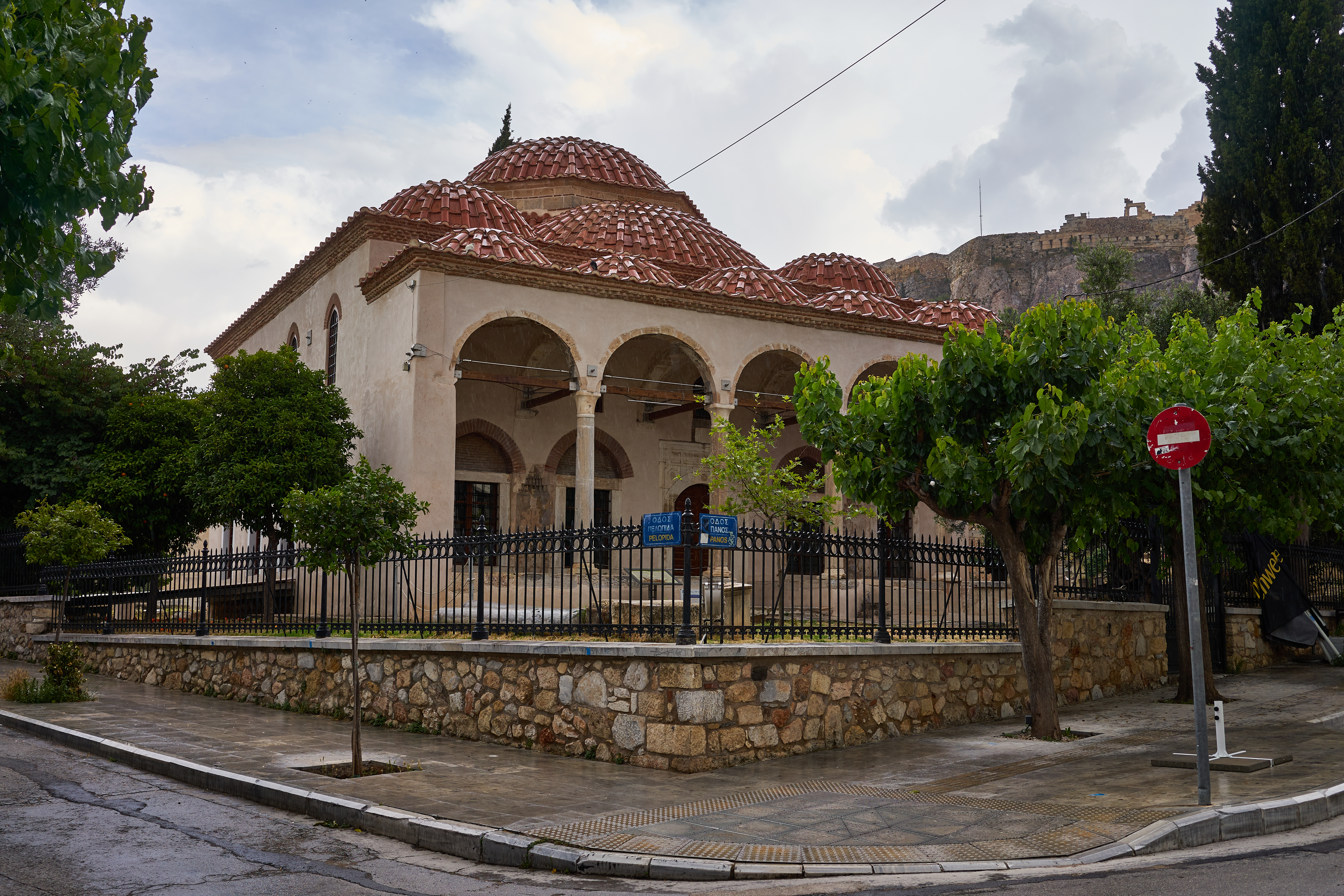
Former Fethiye Mosque in Athens (1670)

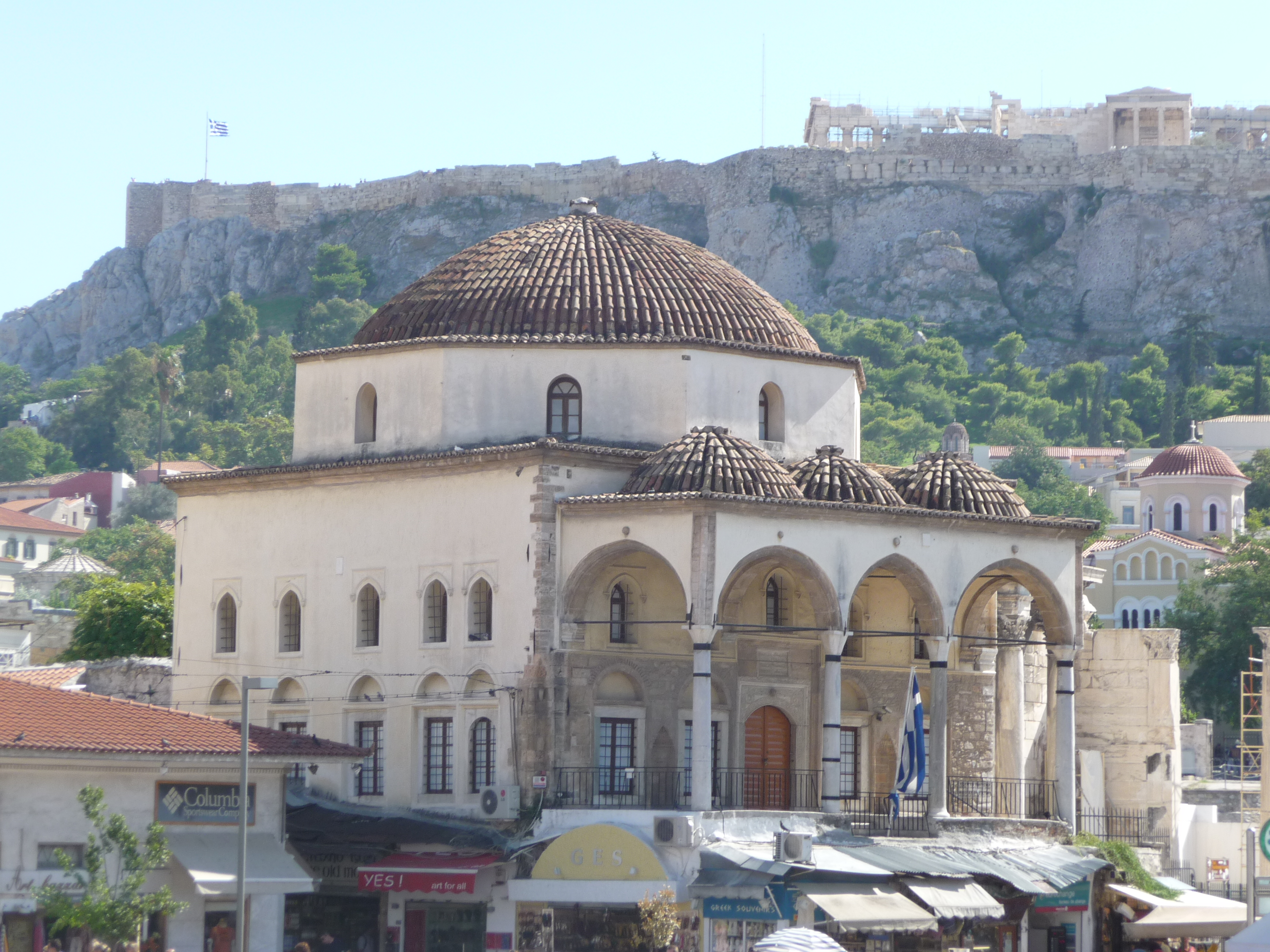
Former Tzistarakis Mosque, now Museum of Greek Folk Art in Athens (1759)

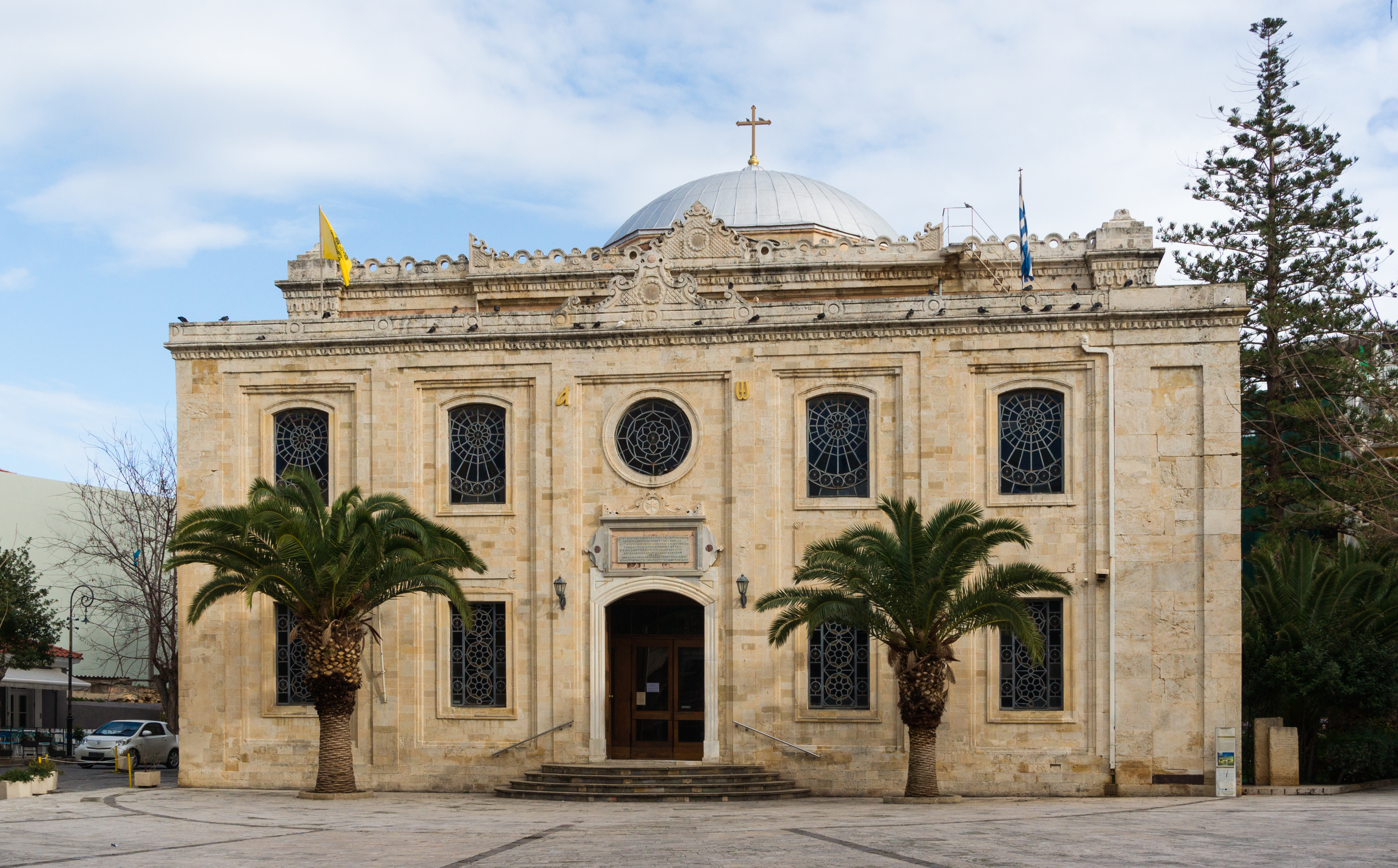
Former Yeni Cami ("New Mosque"), now Saint Titus Cathedral in Heraklion (1869)

=== Neoclassical architecture ===
Urban plan of Patras, 1830

After the Greek Independence, the modern Greek architects tried to combine traditional Greek and Byzantine elements and motives with the western European movements and styles. Patras was the first city of the modern Greek state to develop a city plan. In January 1829, Stamatis Voulgaris, a Greek engineer of the French army, presented the plan of the new city to the Governor Kapodistrias, who approved it. Voulgaris applied the orthogonal rule in the urban complex of Patras. However his initial plan was modified in 1830.

Two special genres can be considered the Cycladic architecture, featuring whitewashed houses, in the Cyclades and the Epirotic architecture in the region of Epirus, featuring stone houses.

After the establishment of the Greek Kingdom, the architecture of Athens and other cities was mostly influenced by the Neoclassical architecture. For Athens, the first King of Greece, Otto of Greece, commissioned the architects Stamatios Kleanthis and Eduard Schaubert to design a modern city plan fit for the capital of a state. However, the first buildings in this style had already appeared somewhat earlier in what is now Greece, an example being the Palace of St. Michael and St. George in Corfu, which originally served as the residence of the British Lord High Commissioner of the Ionian Islands.

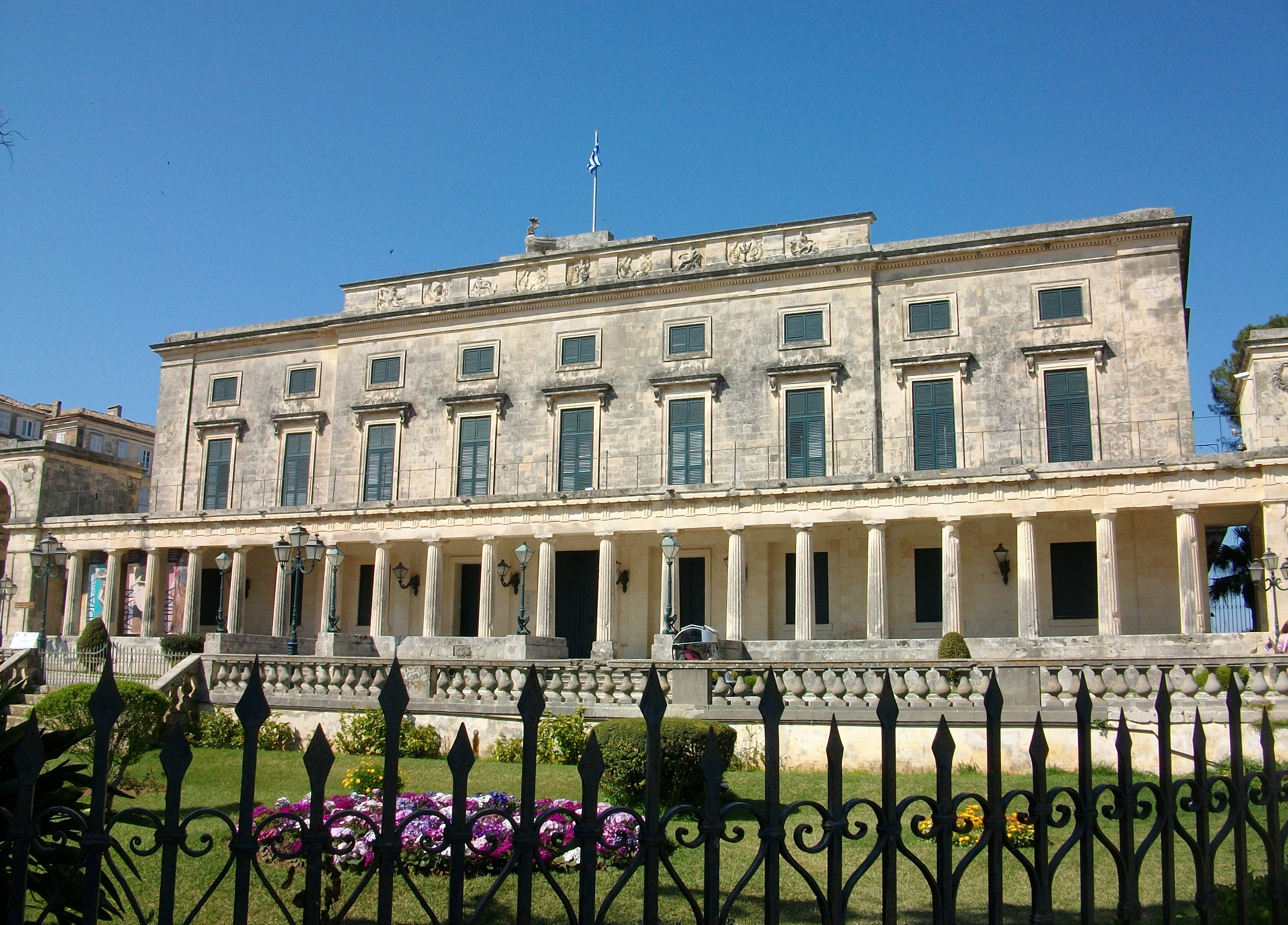
Palace of St. Michael and St. George in Corfu, designed by George Whitmore (1824)

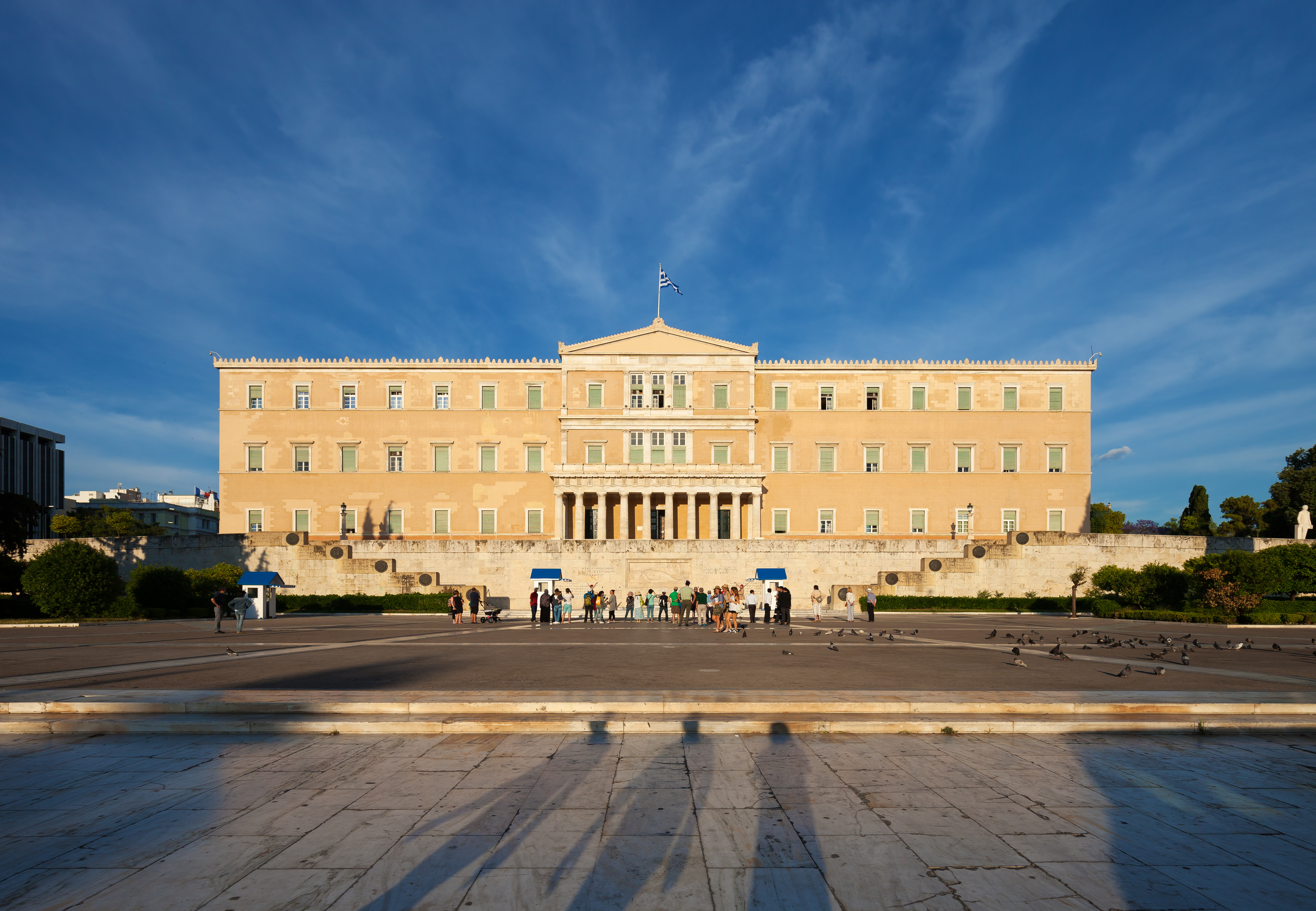
Old Royal Palace in Athens by Friedrich von Gärtner (1843)

The Academy of Athens by Theophil Hansen (1859)

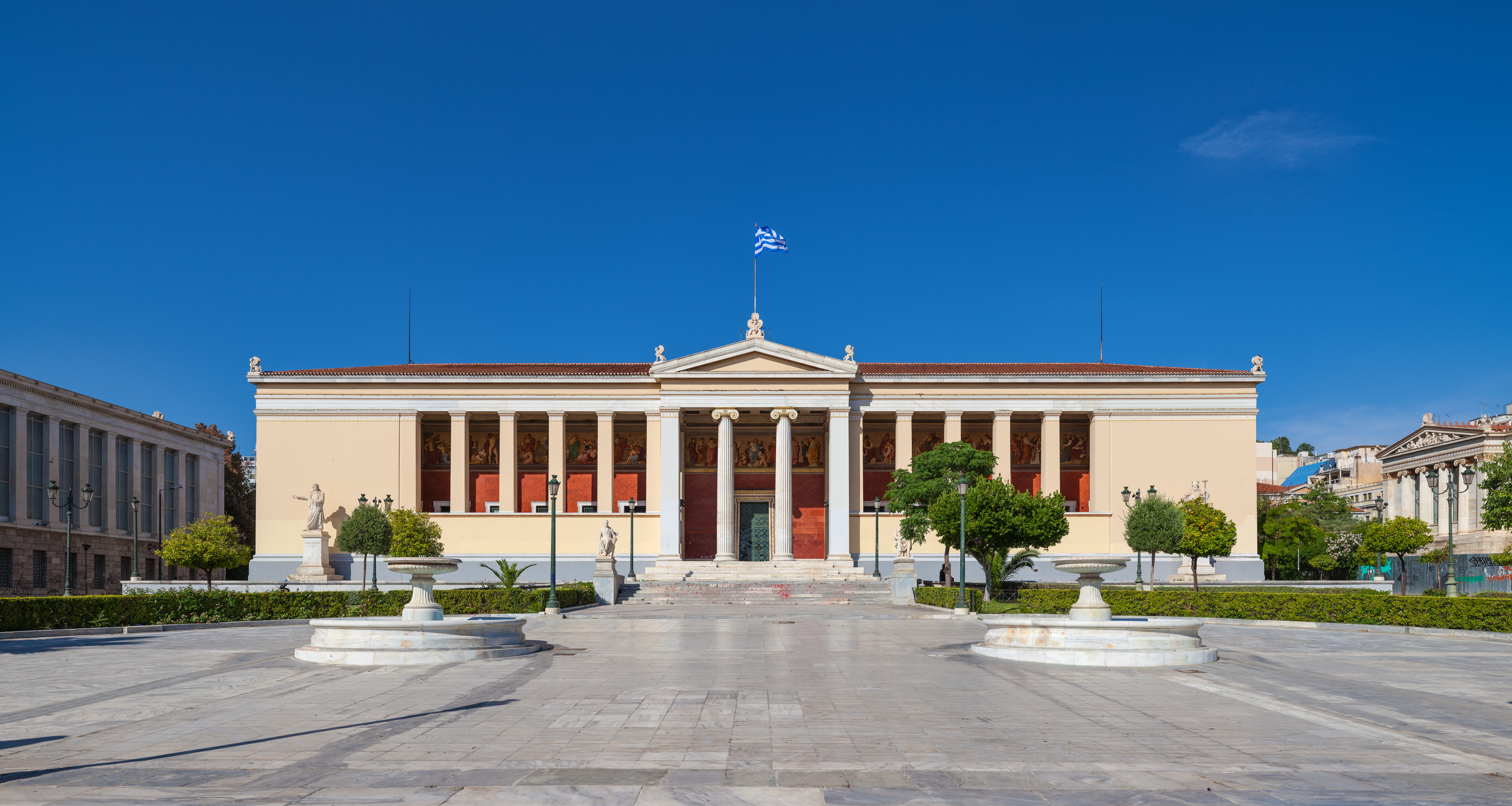
The University of Athens by Christian Hansen (1859)

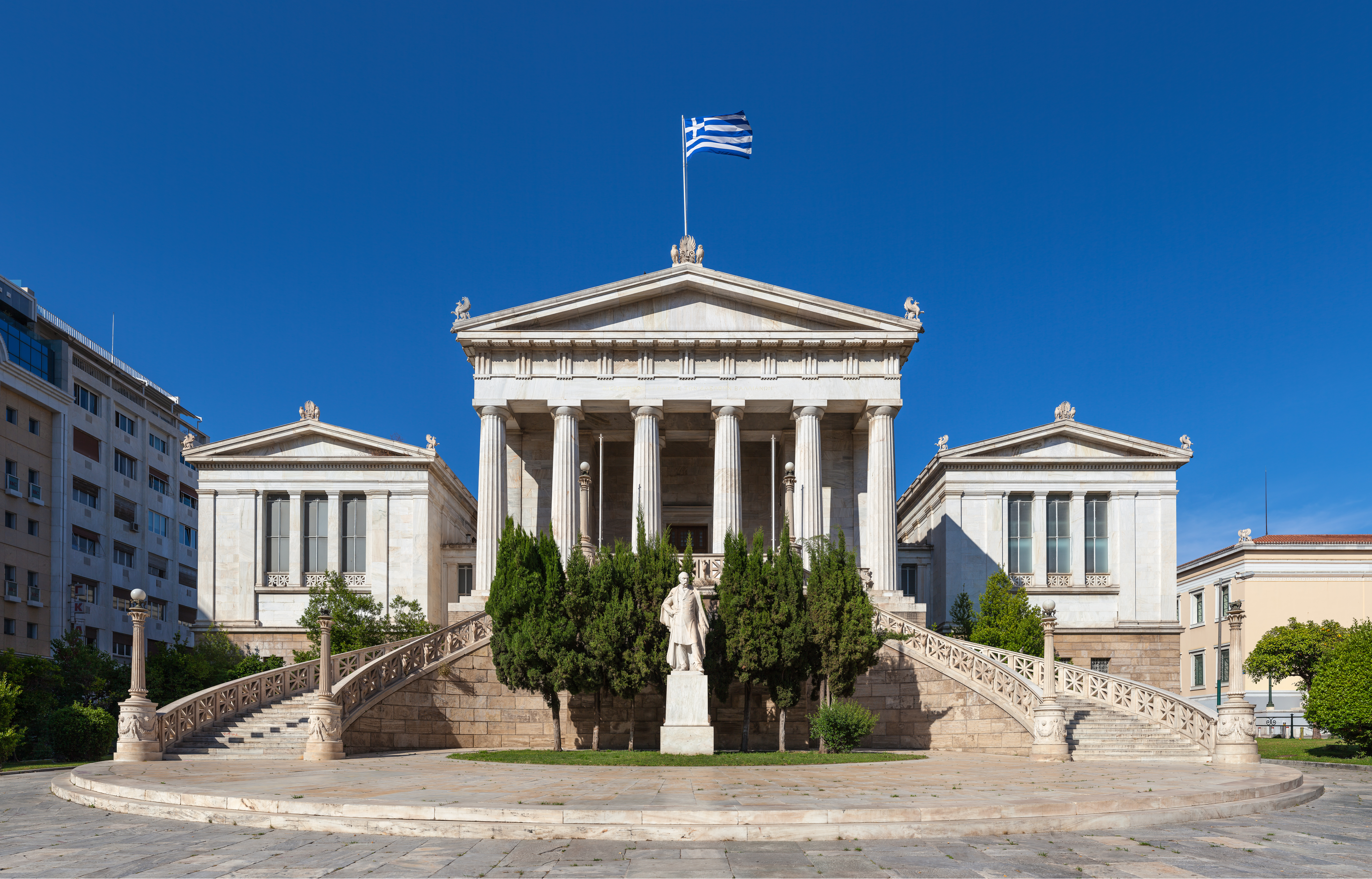
The National Library by Theophil Hansen (1888)

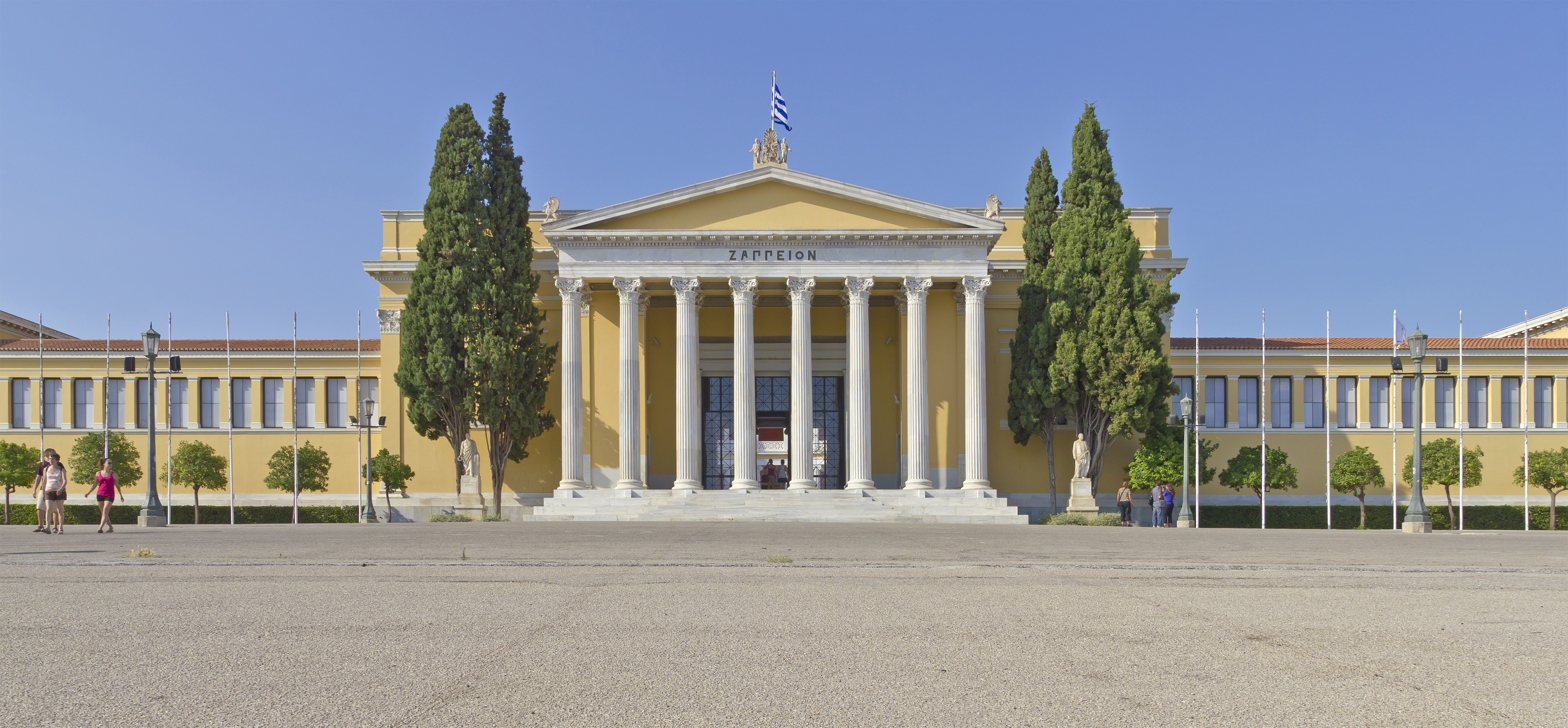
Zappeion in Athens by Theophil Hansen (1888)

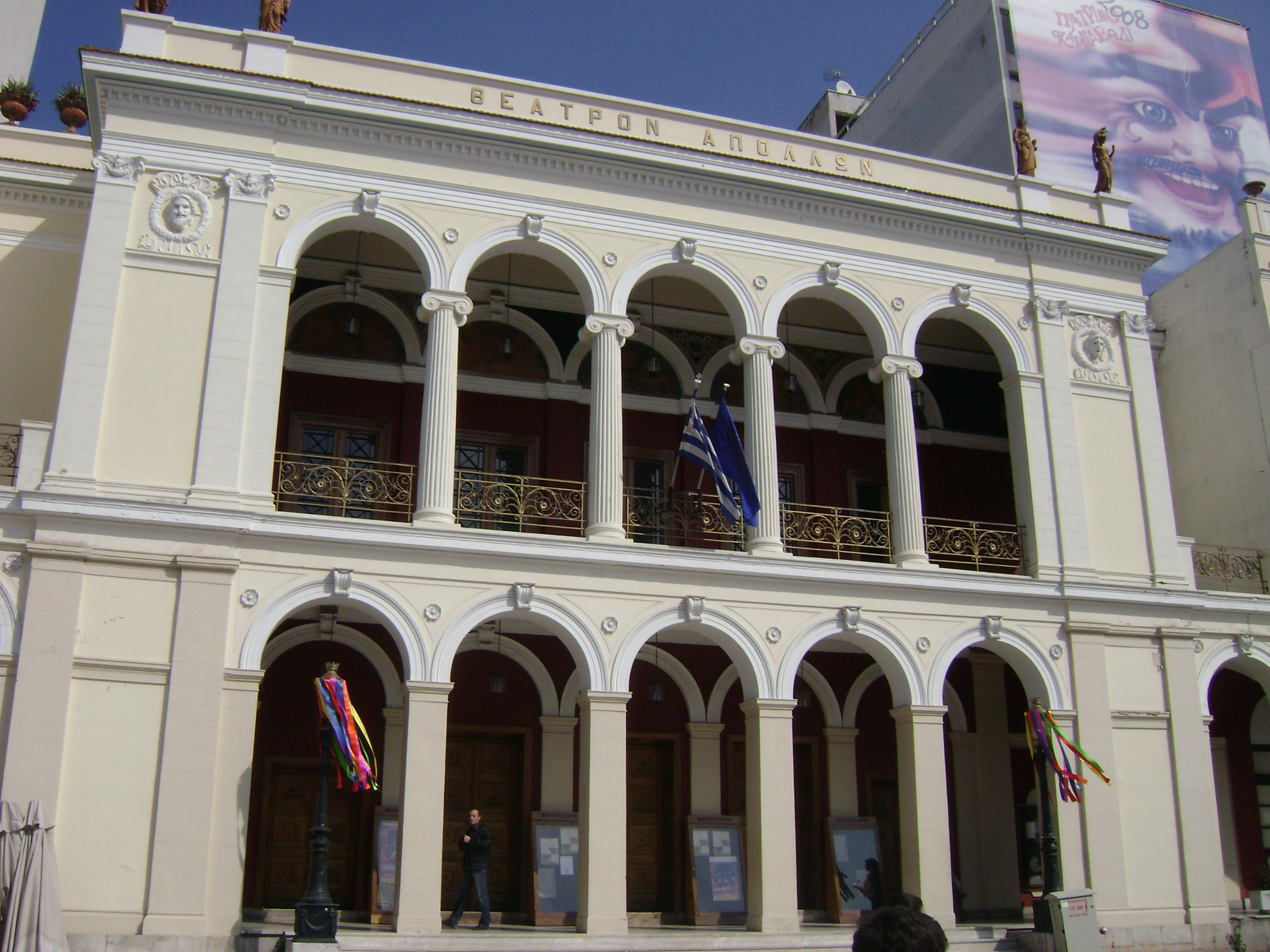
The Apollon Theatre of Patras, designed by Ernst Ziller (1872)

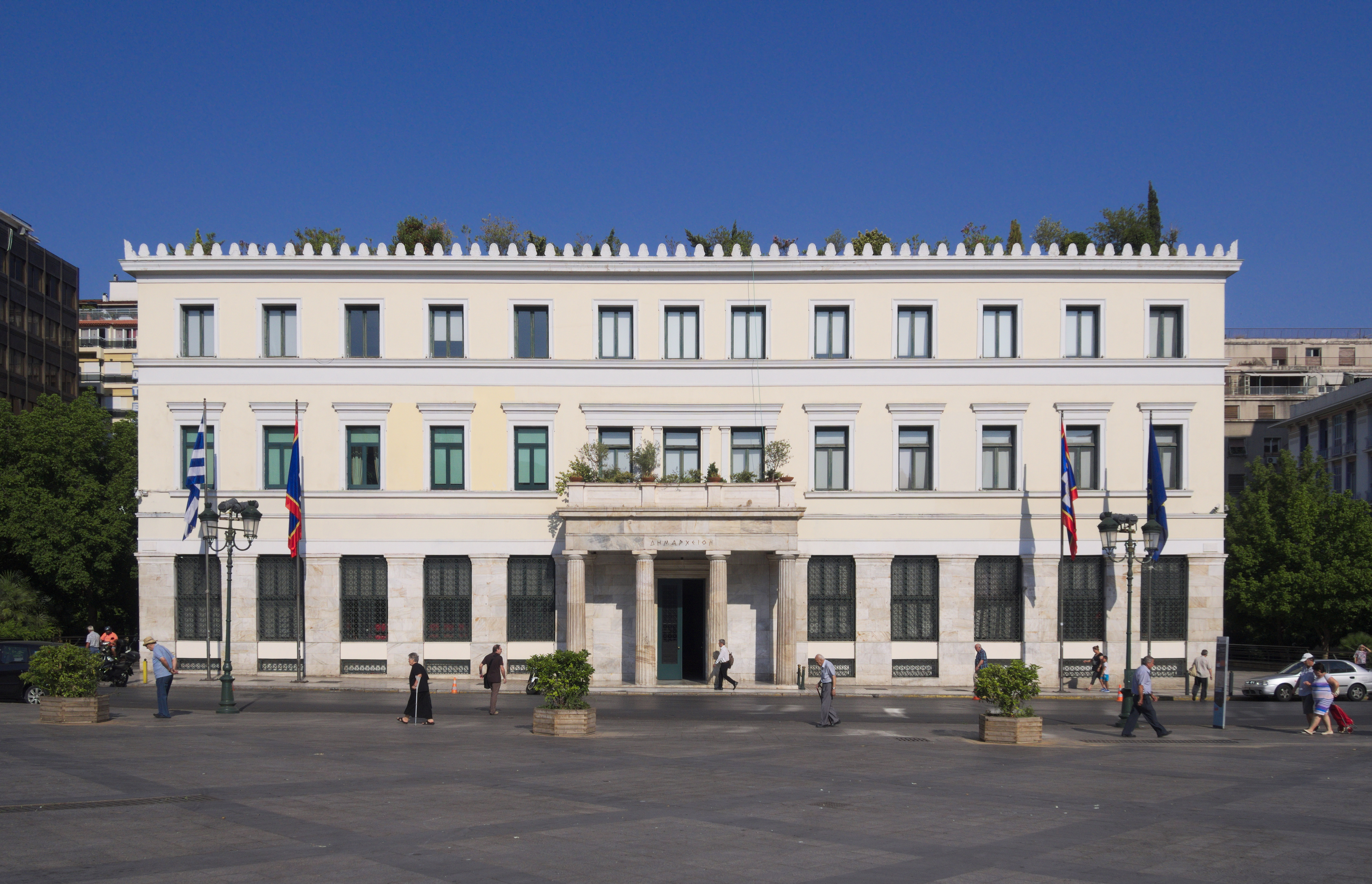
Athens City Hall (1874) by Panagis Kalkos

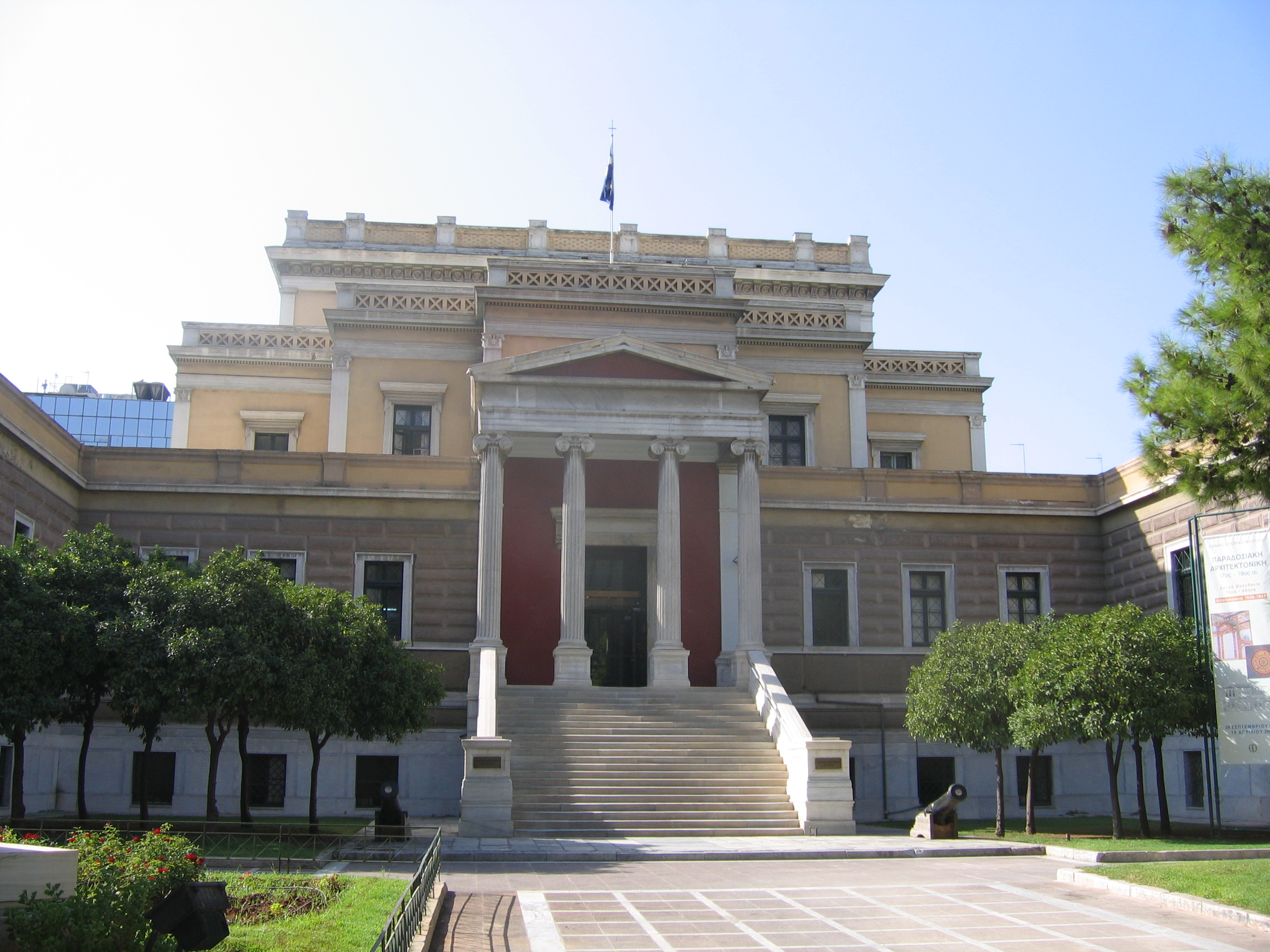
Old Parliament House, Athens (1875) by Panagis Kalkos/François Boulanger

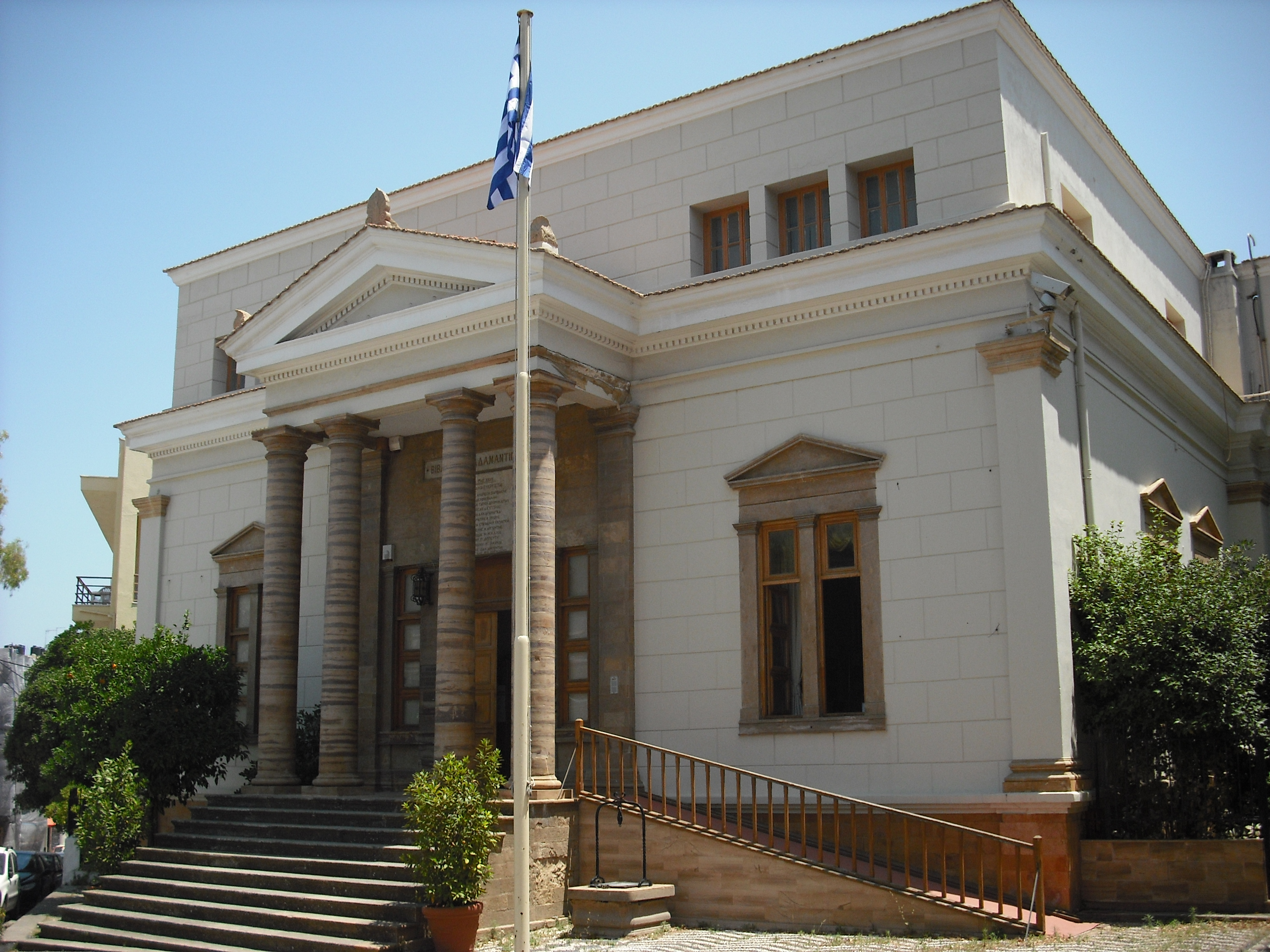
Korais public library of Chios (1885)

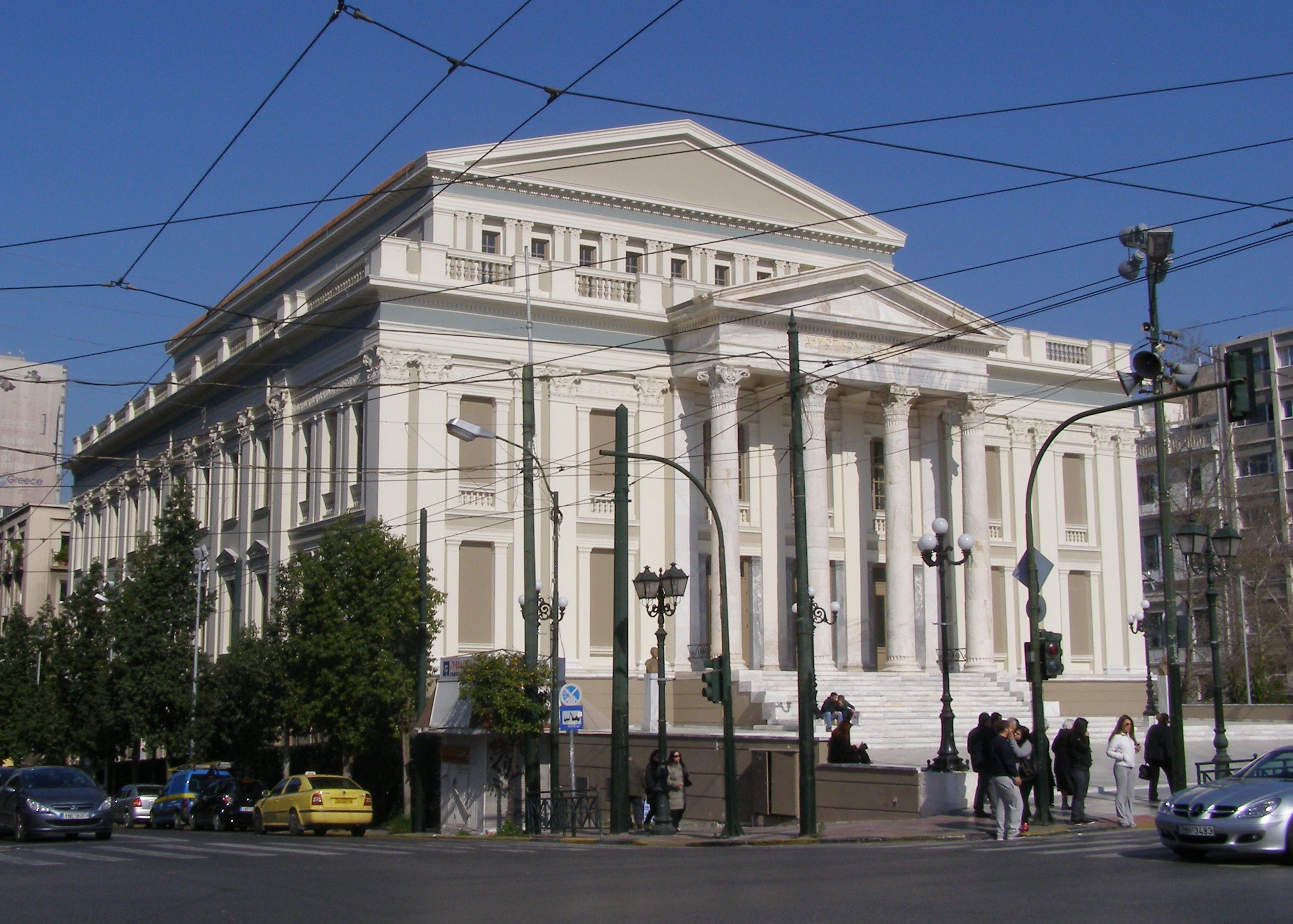
Municipal Theatre of Piraeus (1895)

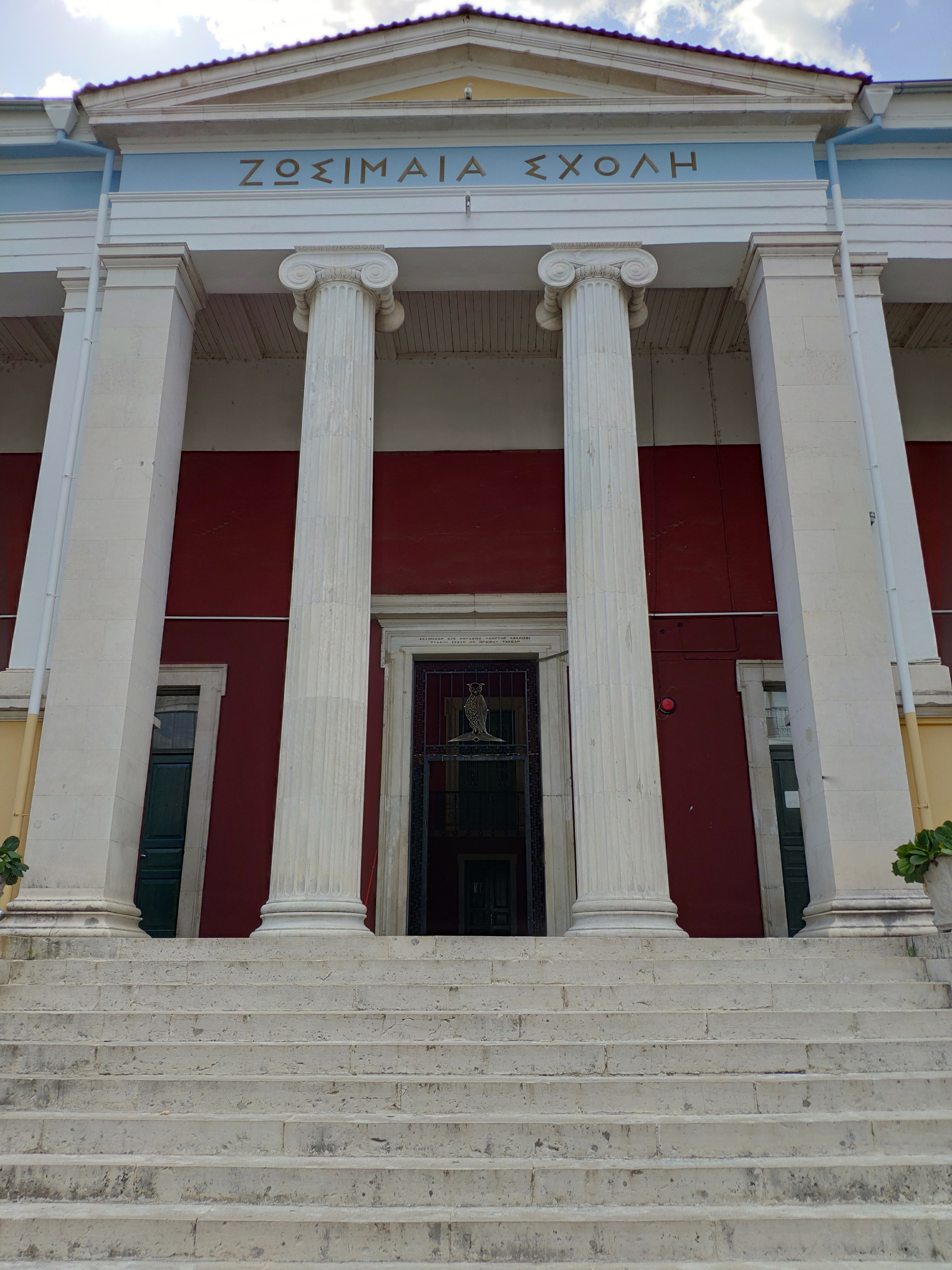
Zosimaia School building, Ioannina (1905)

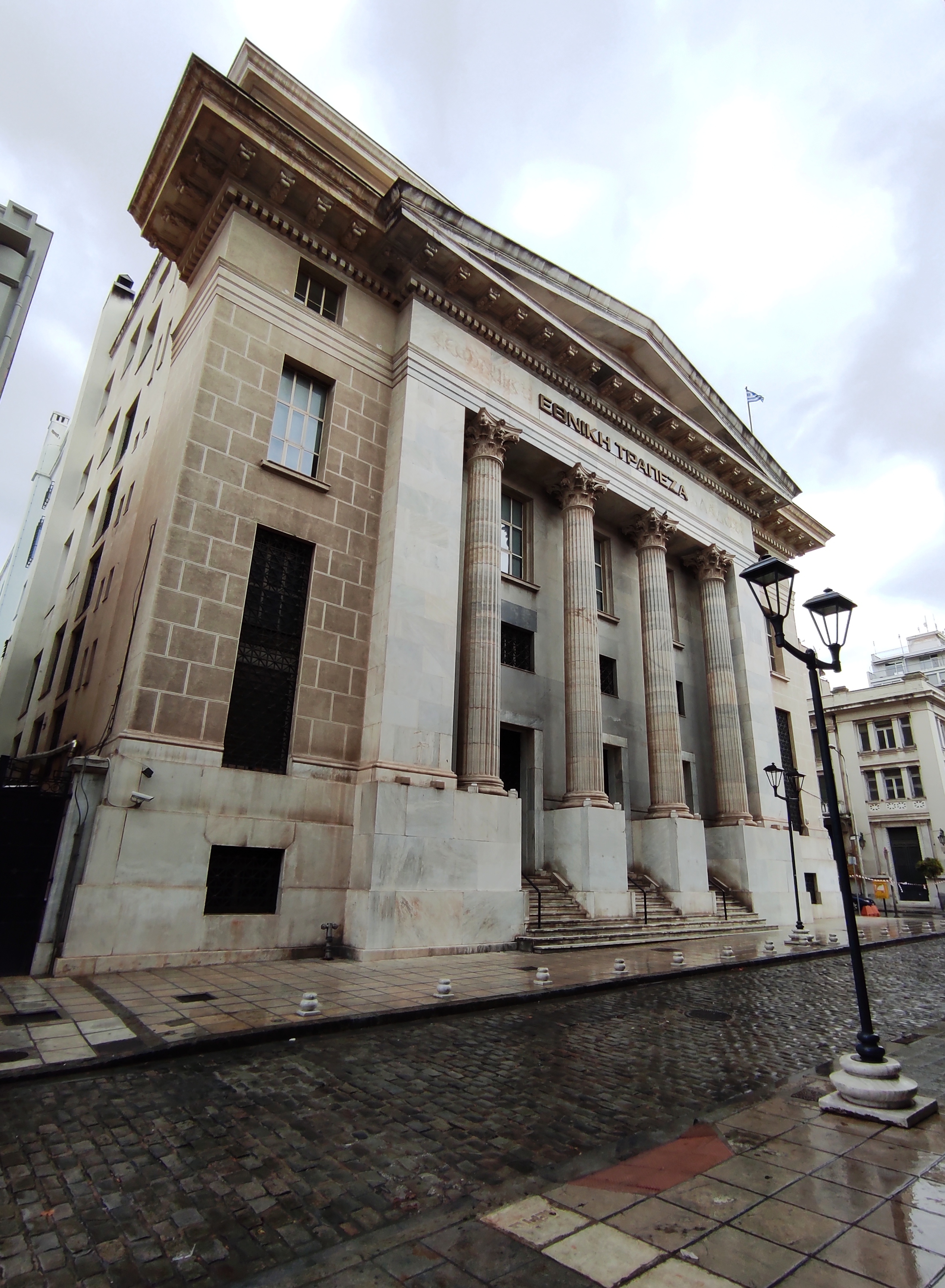
National Bank of Greece in Thessaloniki (1928)

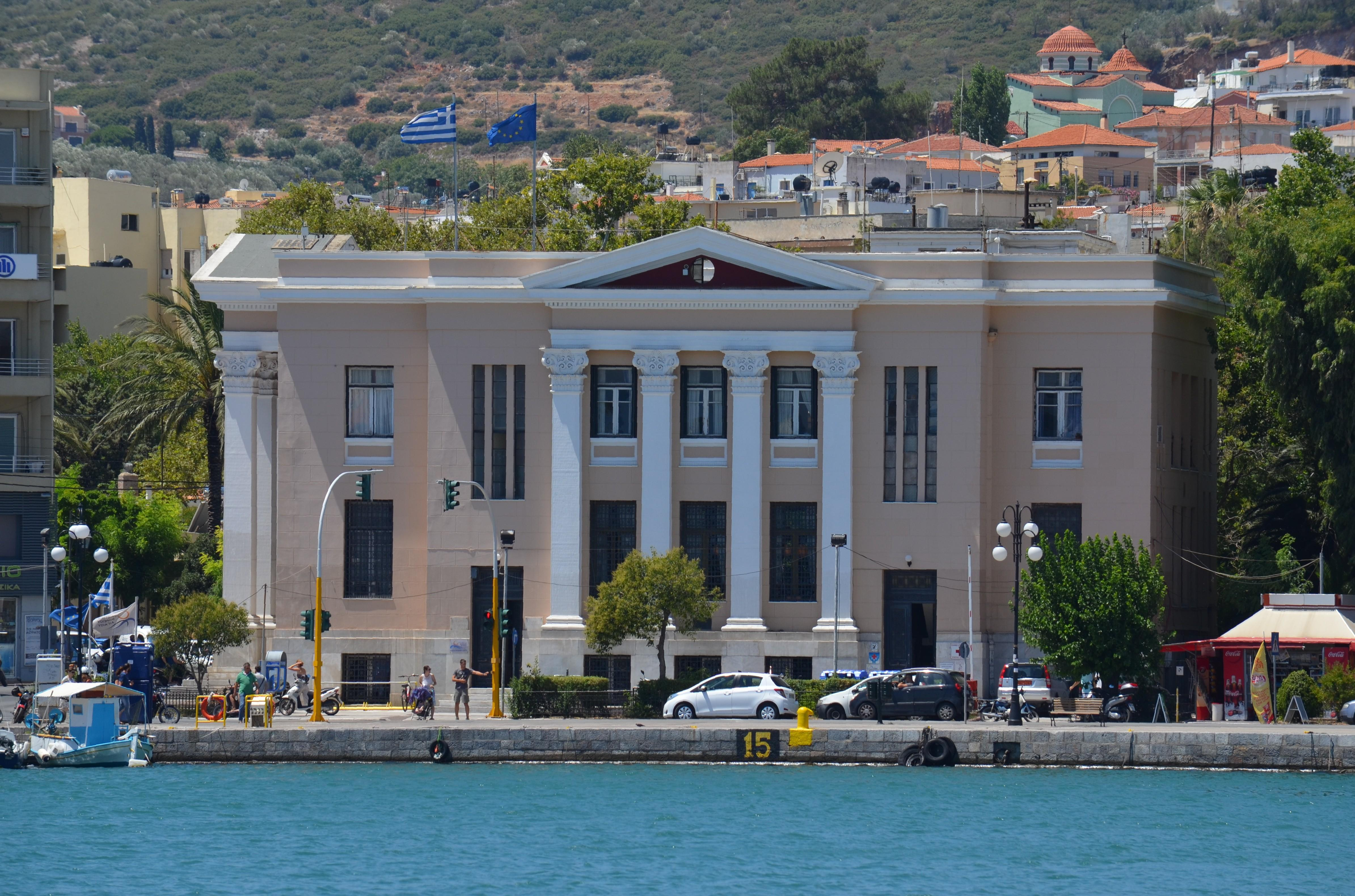
Prefecture of Lesbos (early 20th)

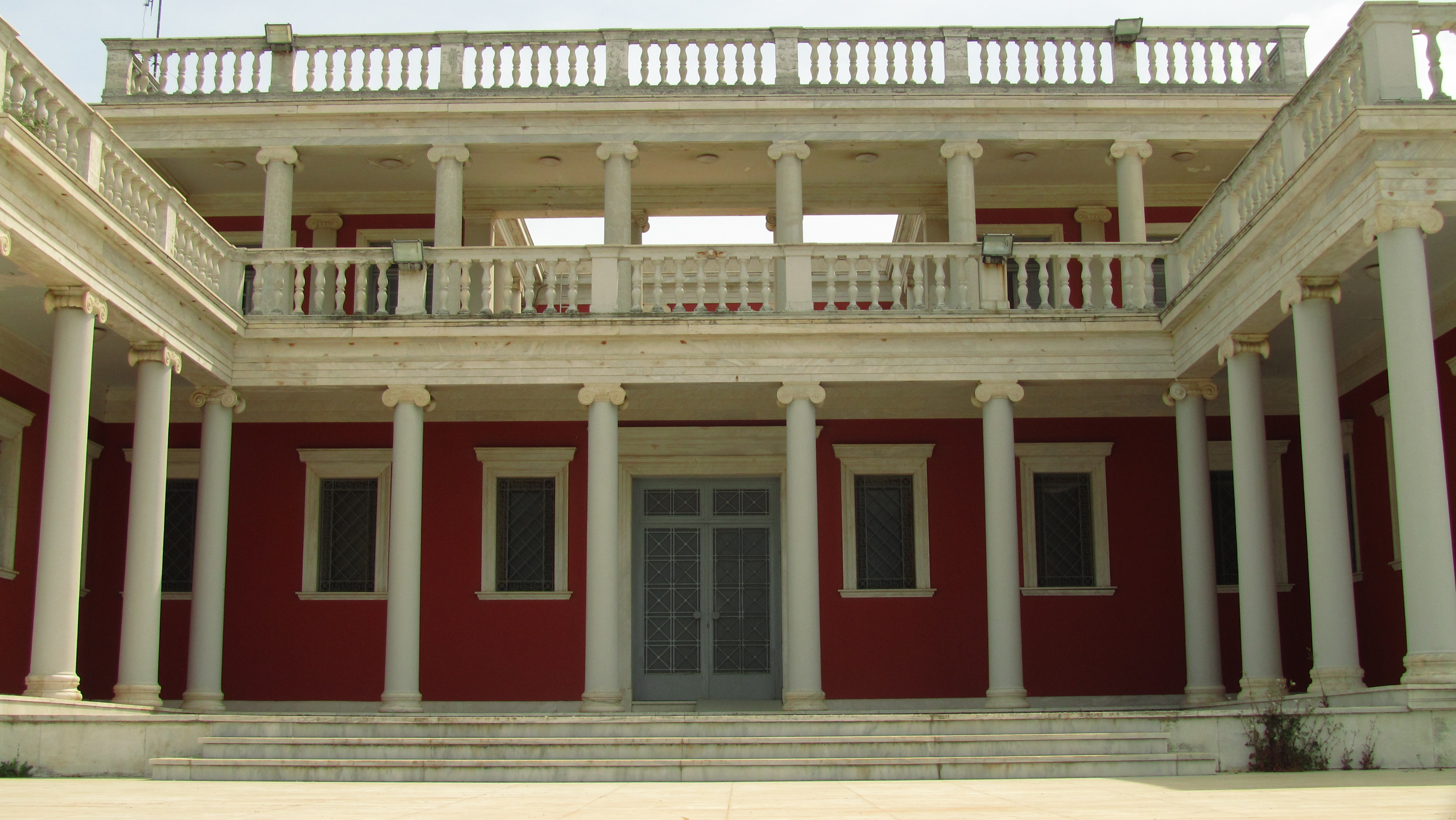
Government House, Thessaloniki (1960)

=== Neo-Renaissance architecture ===
Alongside Neoclassicism, Neo-Renaissance architecture was also developed, although on a smaller scale. The most significant example is the St. Dionysius the Areopagite Catholic Cathedral in Athens. In the architecture of Orthodox churches, this style was less popular, however, examples can also be found in the cathedrals of Chania and Heraklion on Crete.

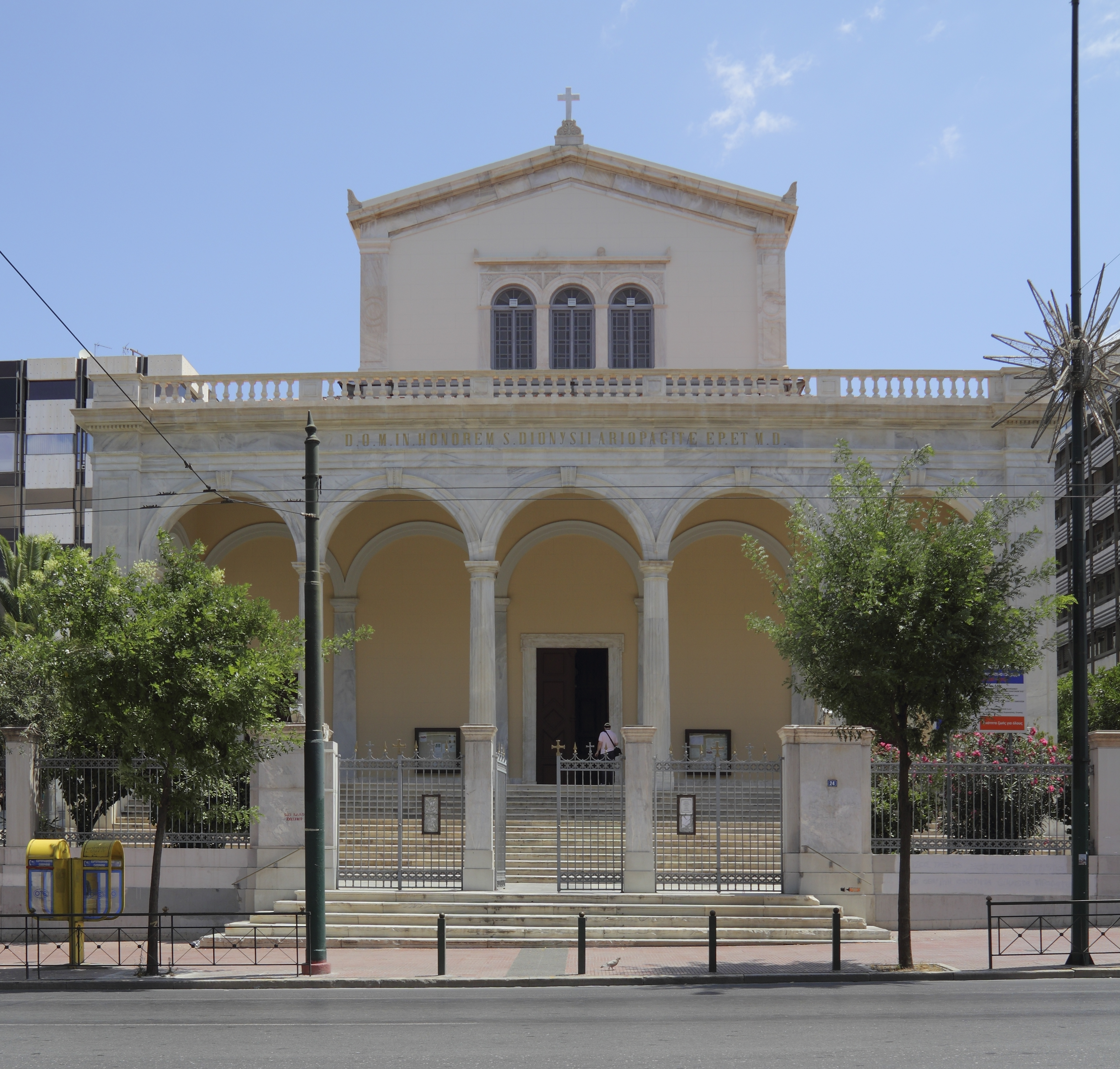
St. Dionysius the Areopagite Catholic Cathedral in Athens by Leo von Klenze and Lysandros Kaftanzoglou (1865)

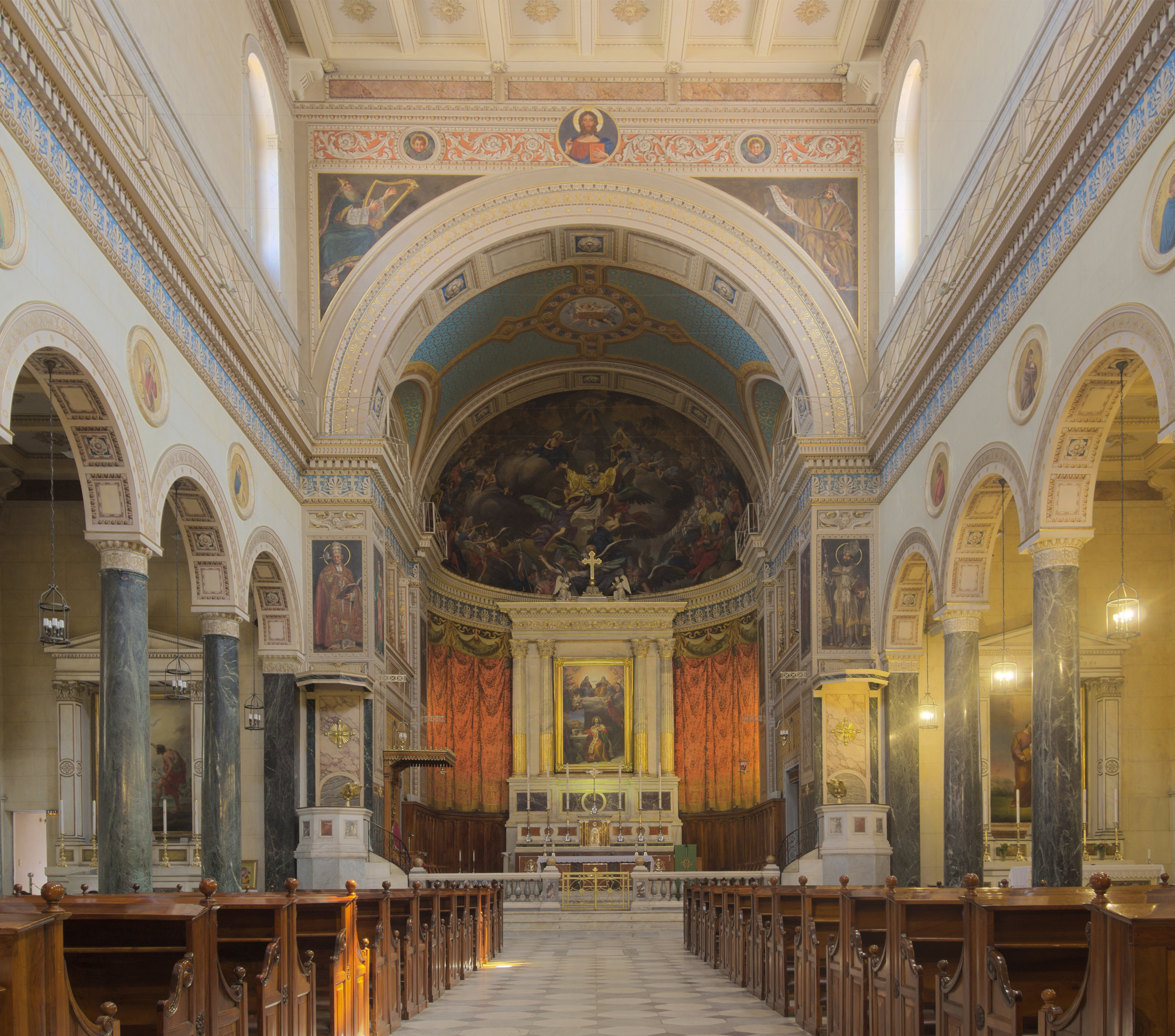
St. Dionysius the Areopagite Catholic Cathedral in Athens, interior

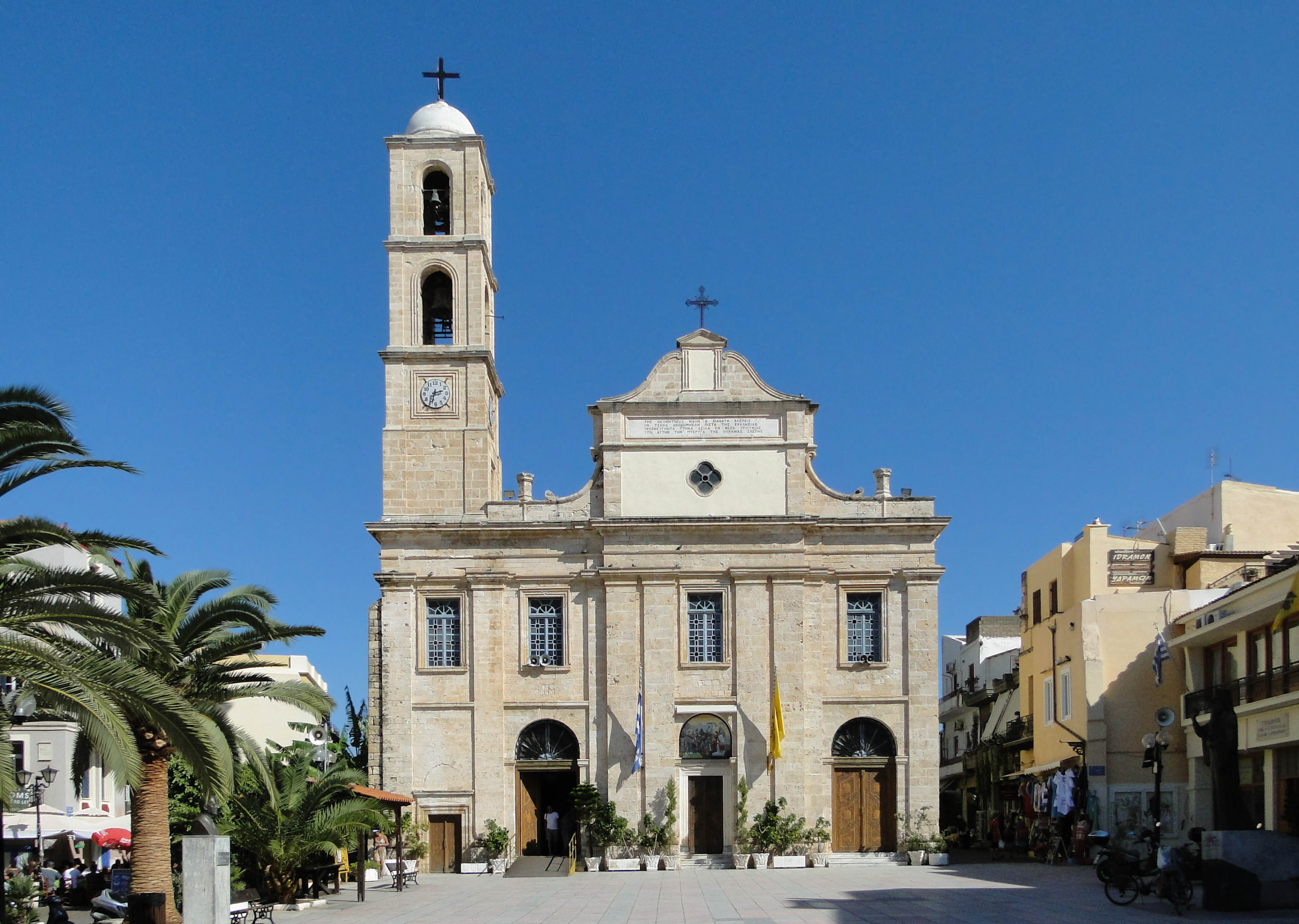
Cathedral of Chania (1860)

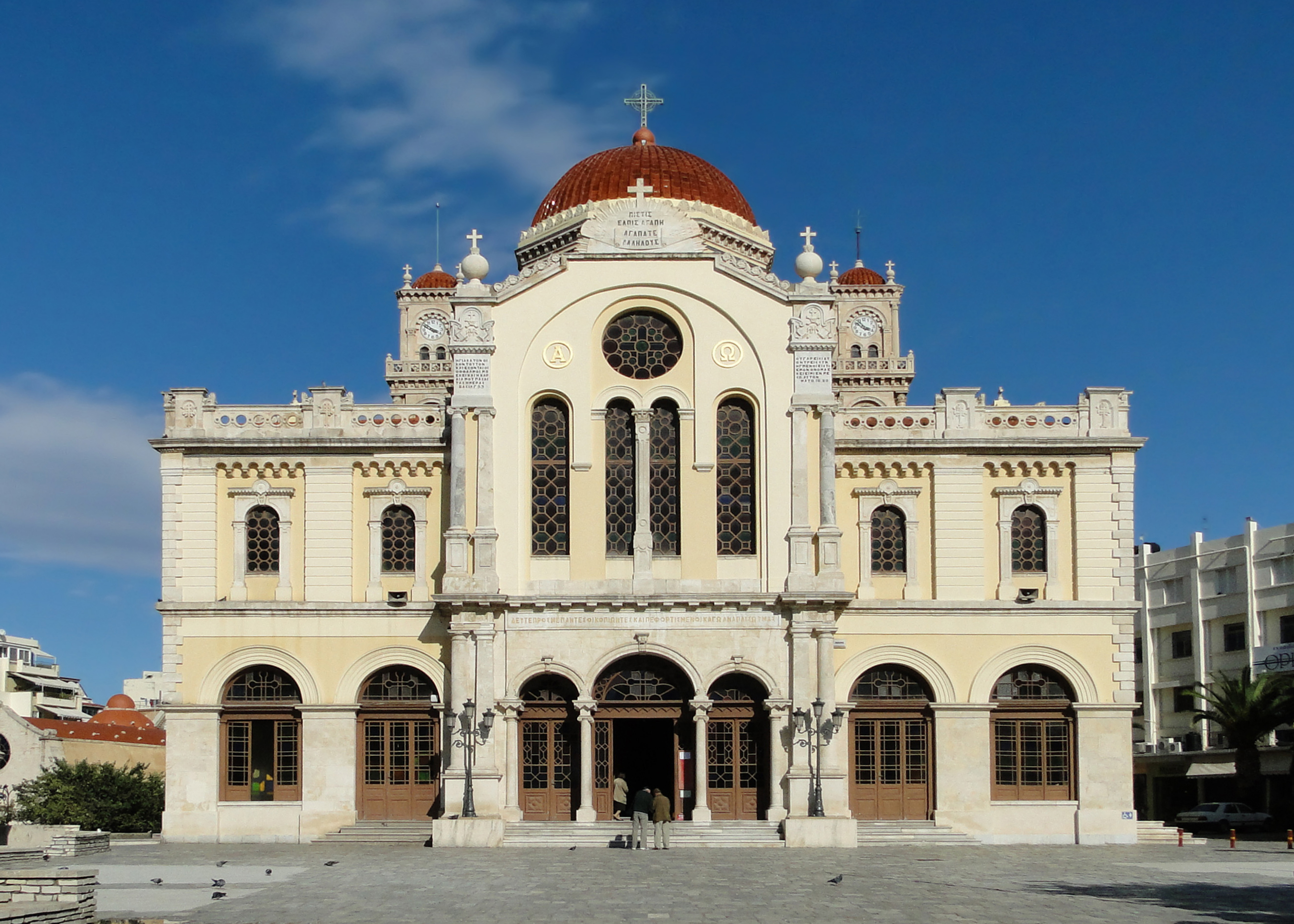
Agios Minas Cathedral in Heraklion (1895)

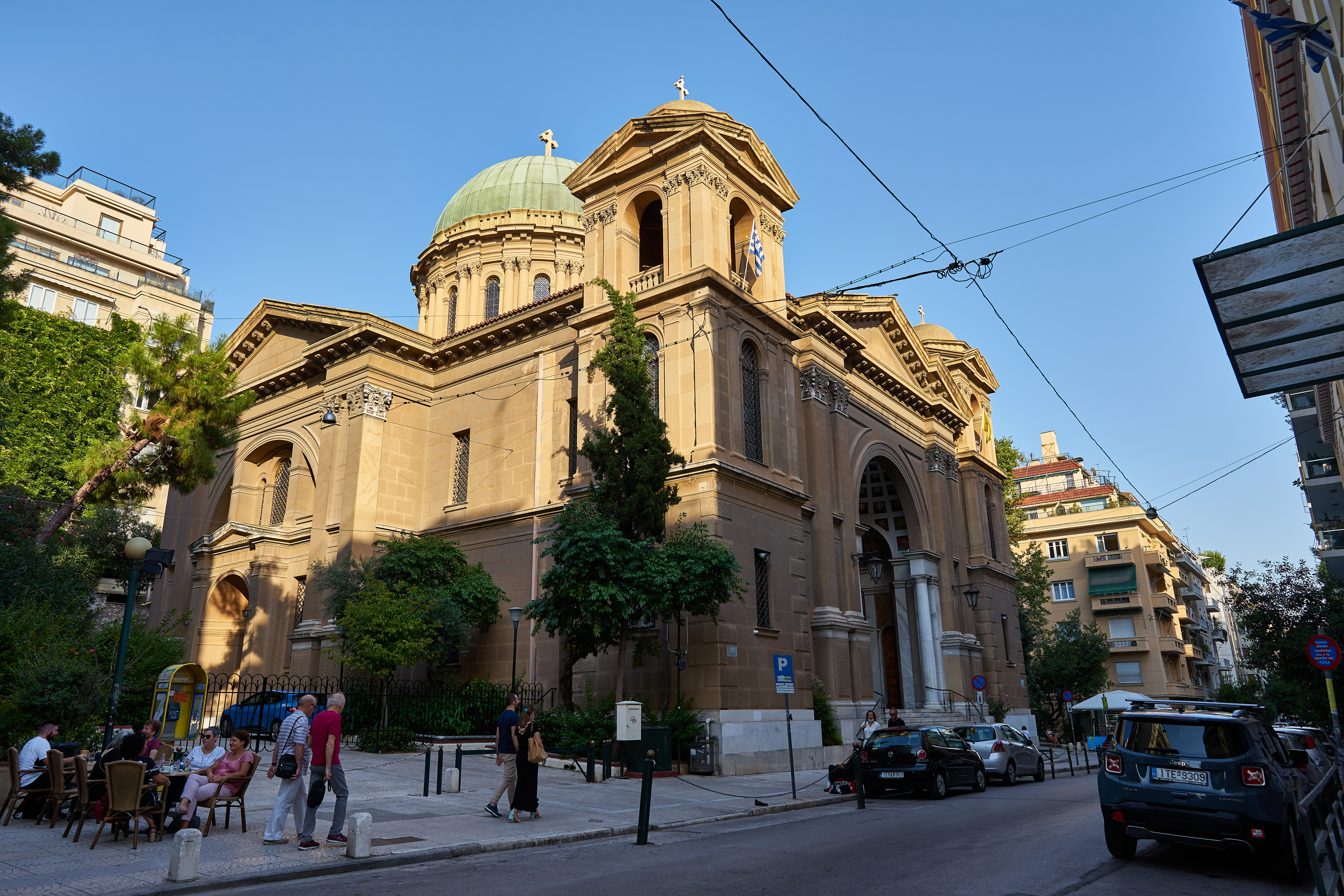
Church of Saint Dionysius the Areopagite in Kolonaki disctrict in Athens (1931)

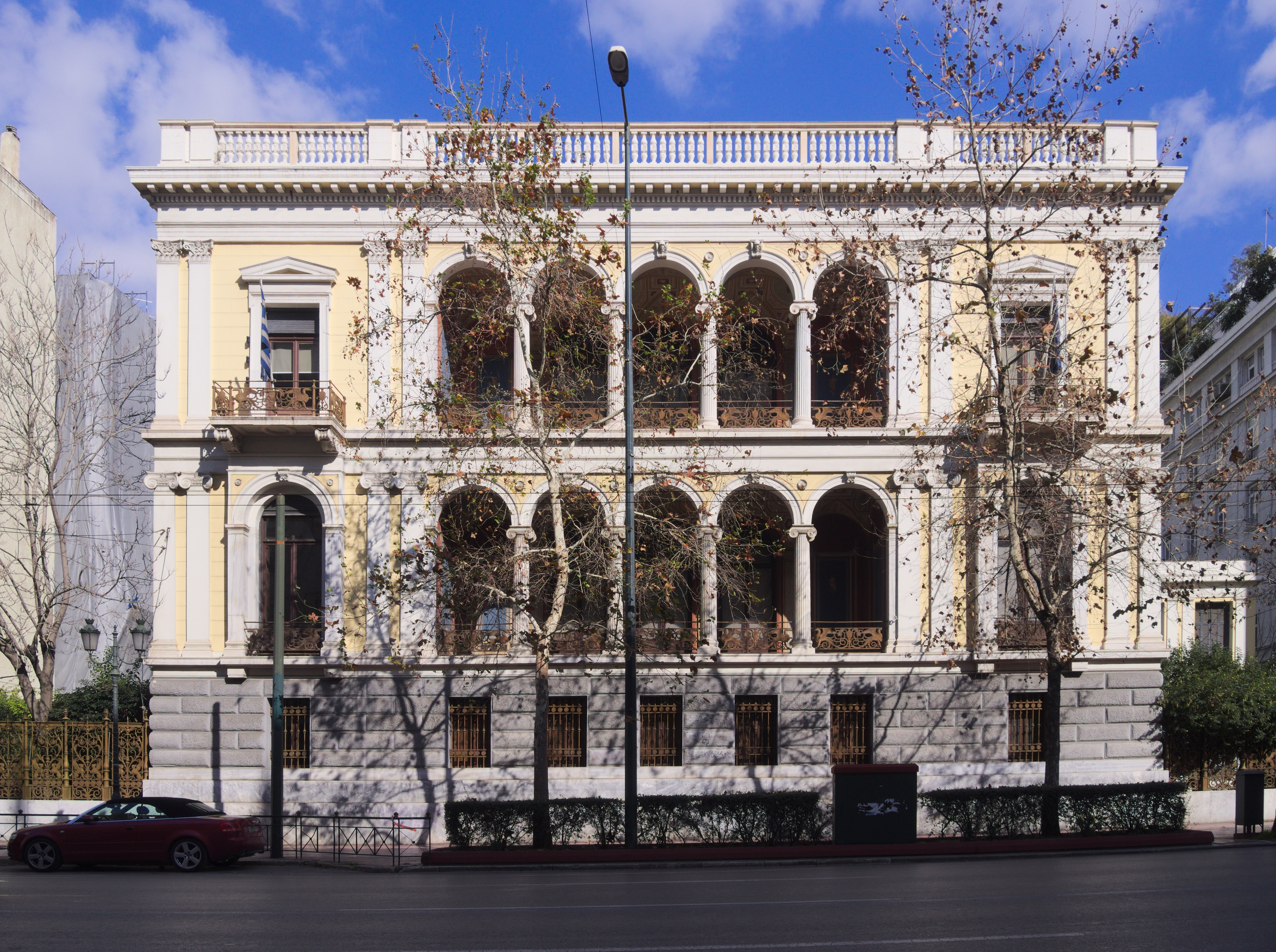
Numismatic Museum of Athens by Ernst Ziller (1880)

=== Neo-Byzantine architecture ===
Another important style was the Neo-Byzantine style, in which many churches were built. The most notable examples include the Cathedral of Saint Andrew in Patras, the Greek-Catholic Cathedral of Athens and the Cathedral of Saint Nectarios of Aegina.

In 1917 most of Thessaloniki's old center of the city was destroyed by the Great Thessaloniki Fire of 1917. Following the fire the government prohibited quick rebuilding, so it could implement the new redesign of the city according to the European-style urban plan prepared by a commission of architects headed by French architect Ernest Hébrard. The main square is Aristotle Square, which is lined with Neo-Byzantine buildings.

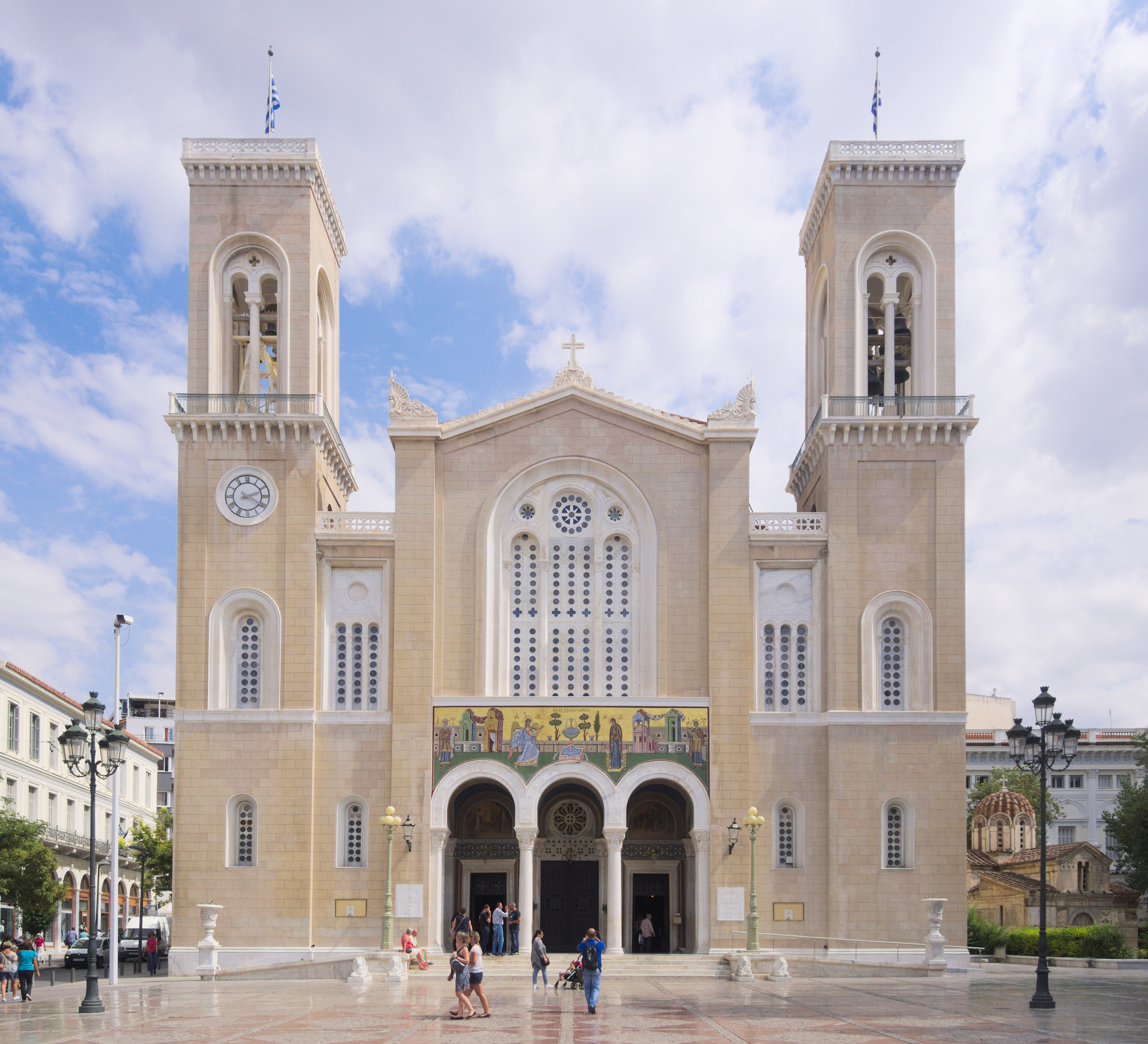
Metropolitan Cathedral of Athens by Theophil Hansen and Dimitris Zezos (1862)

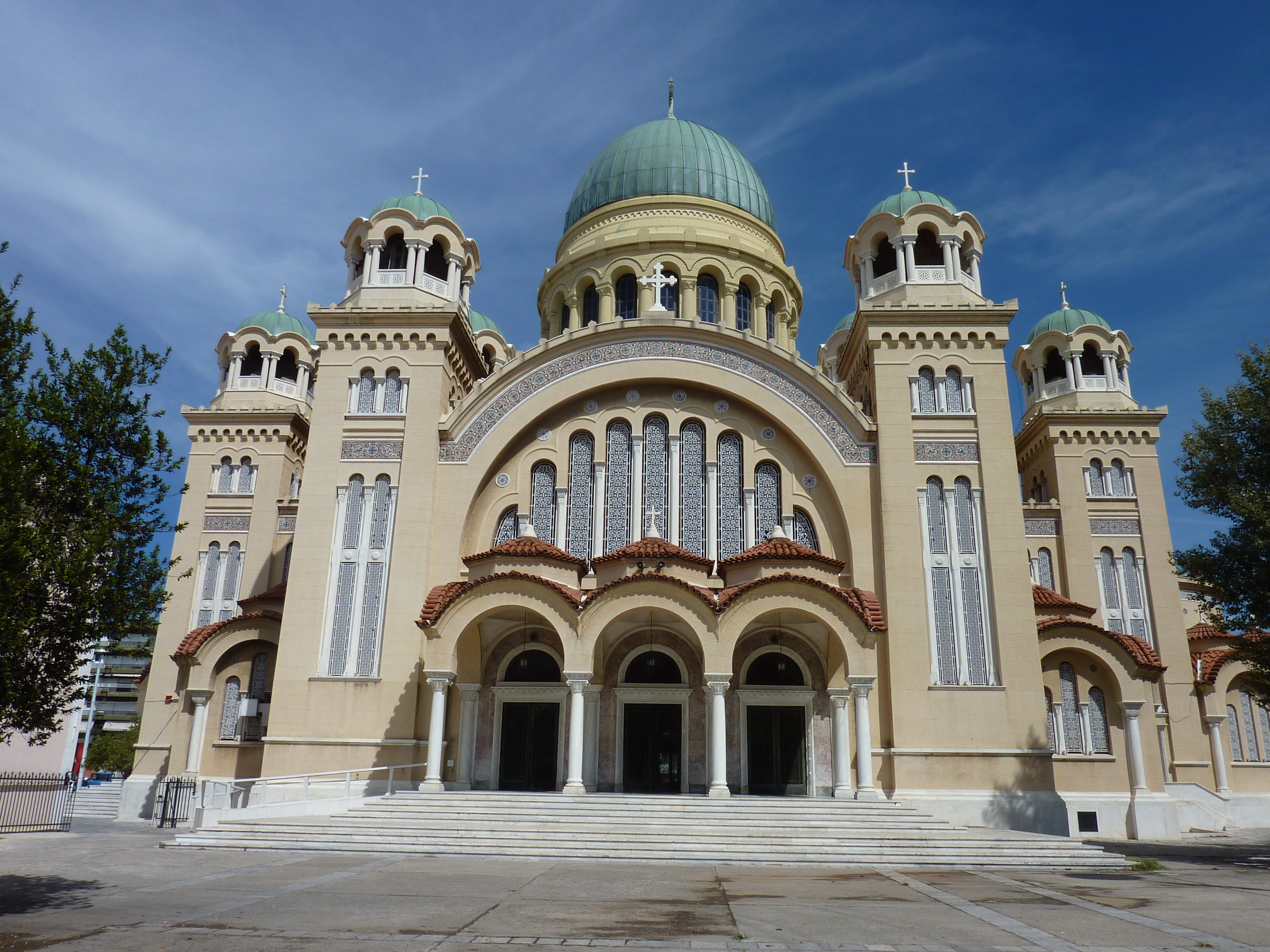
Cathedral of Saint Andrew in Patras (1908–74)

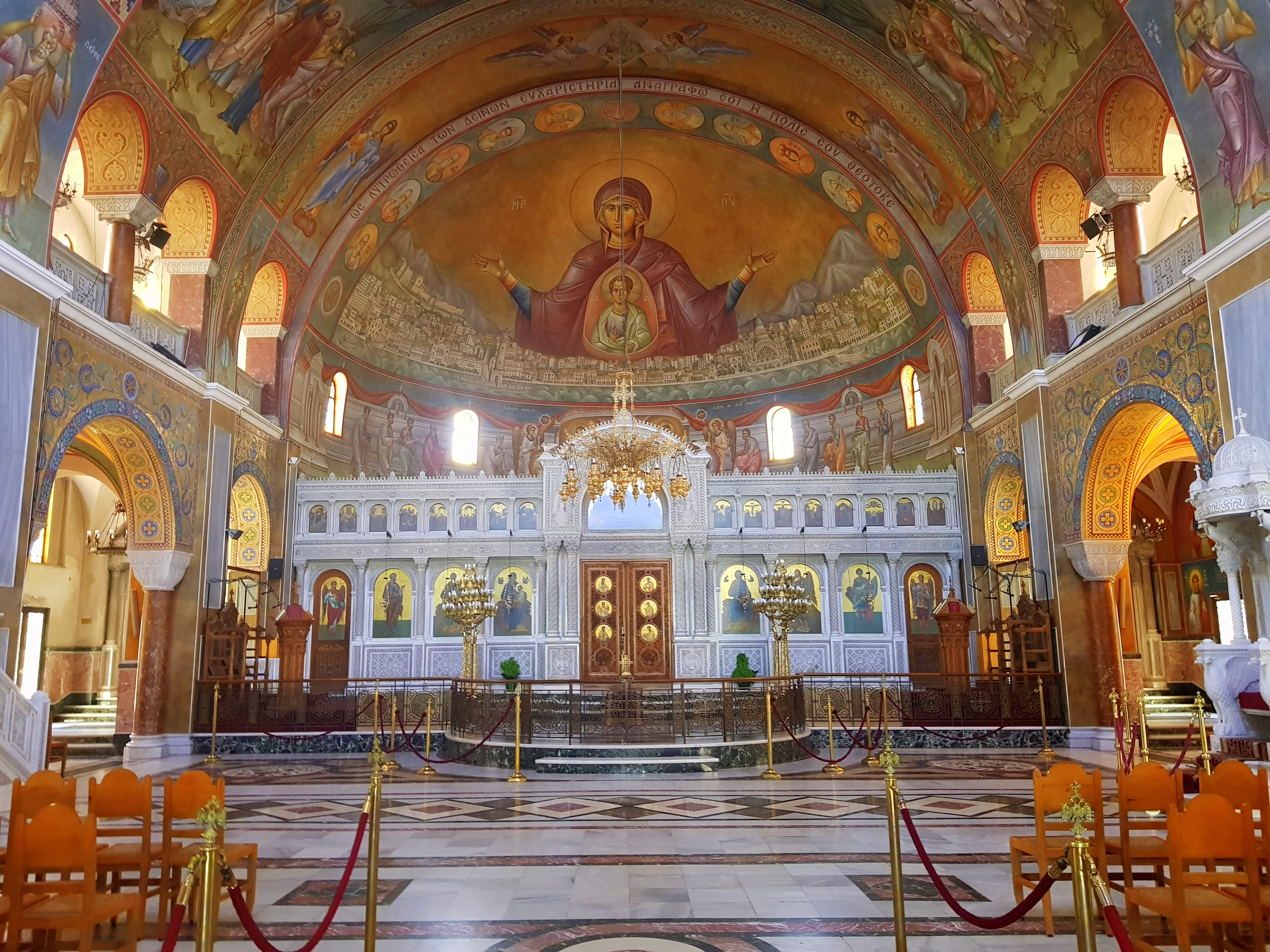
Cathedral of Saint Andrew in Patras, interior

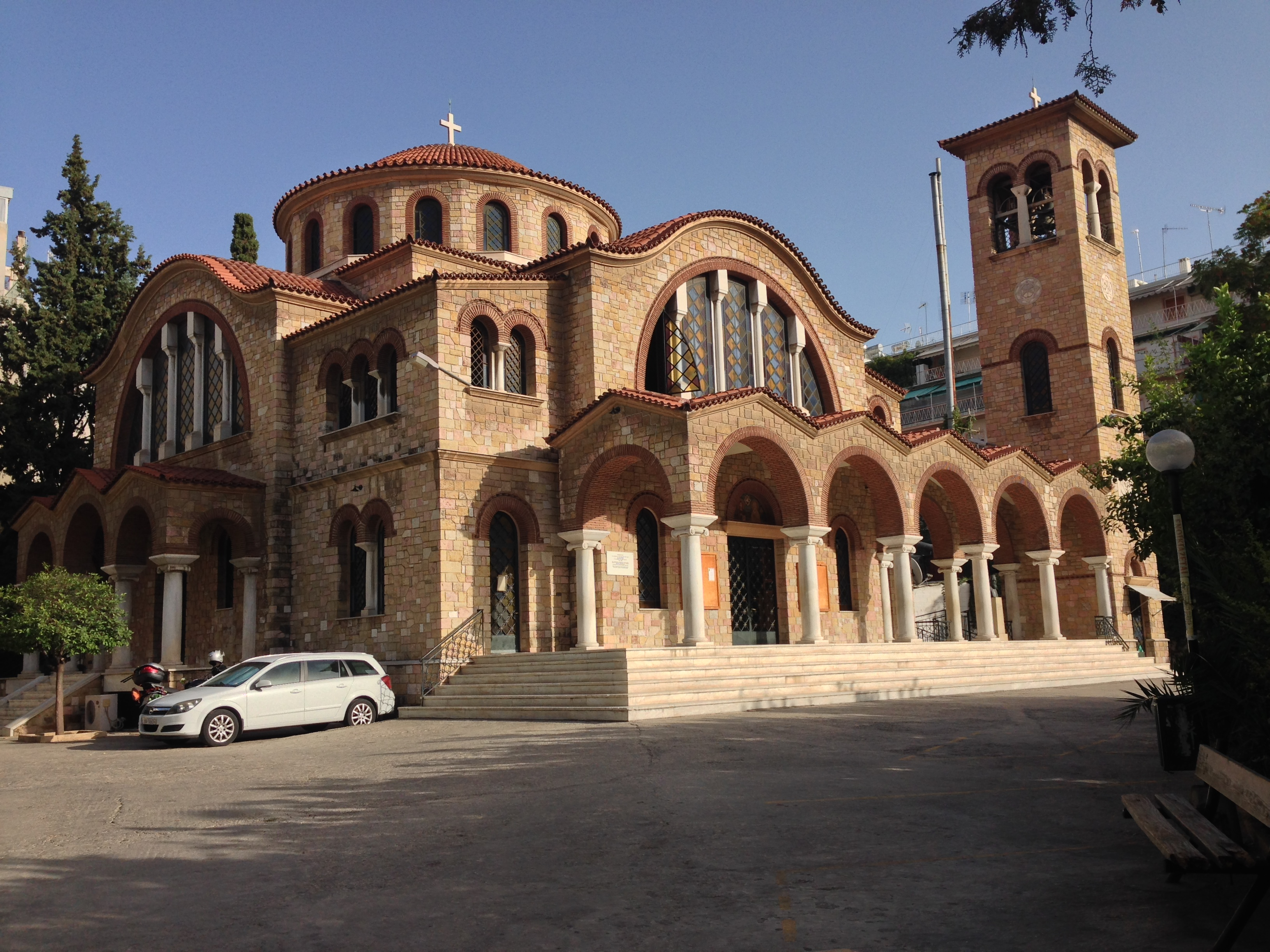
Greek-Catholic Cathedral of Athens (1932)

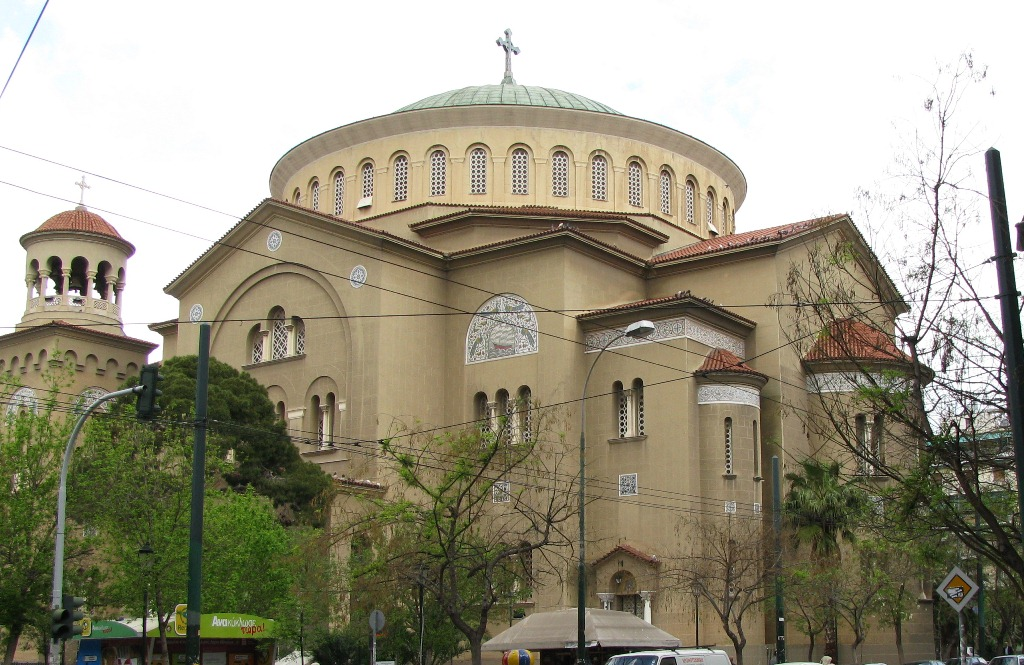
Church of St. Panteleimon of Acharnai in Athens (1930)

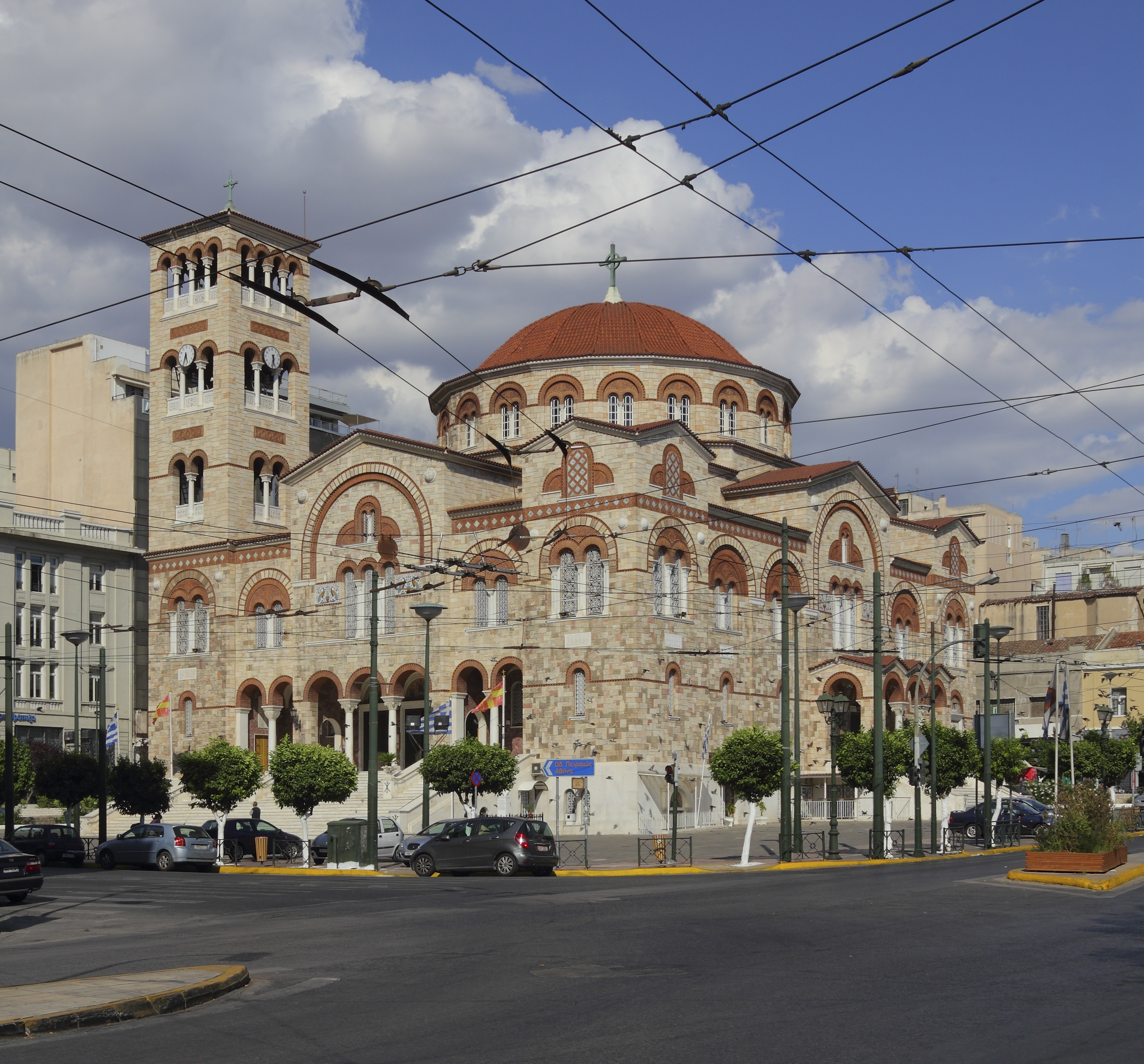
Hagia Triada Cathedral, Piraeus (1956–79)

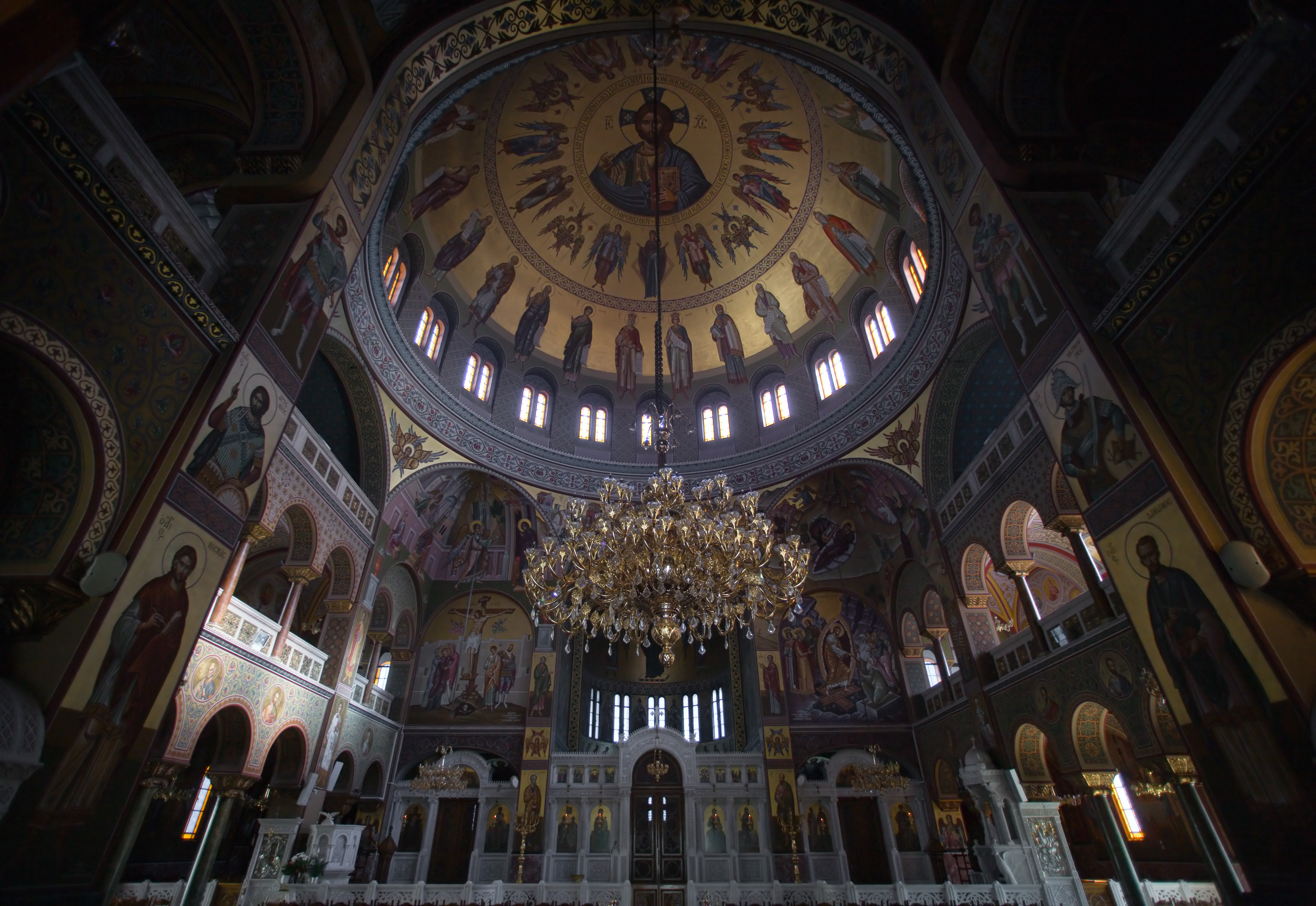
Hagia Triada Cathedral, Piraeus, interior

Cathedral of Saint Nectarios of Aegina

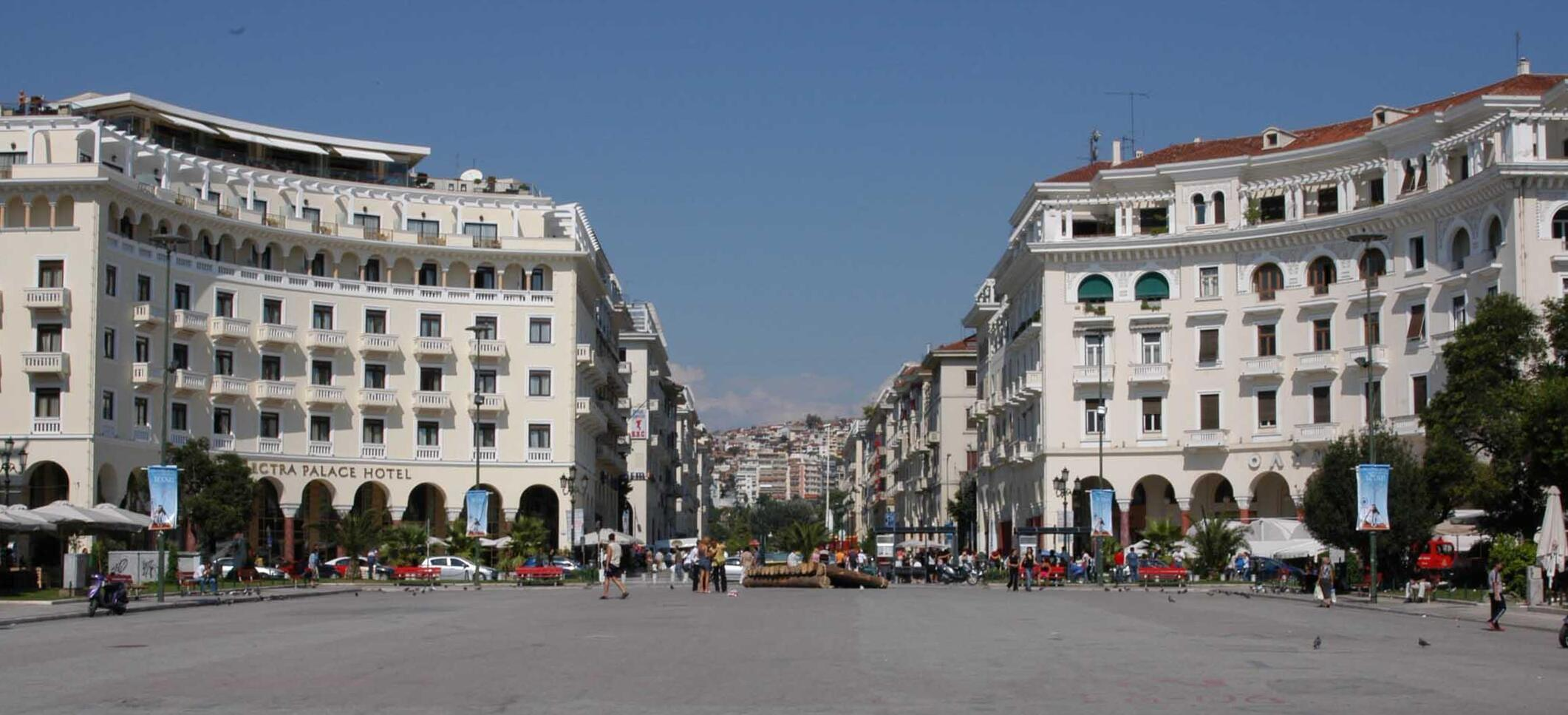
Aristotelous Square in Thessaloniki

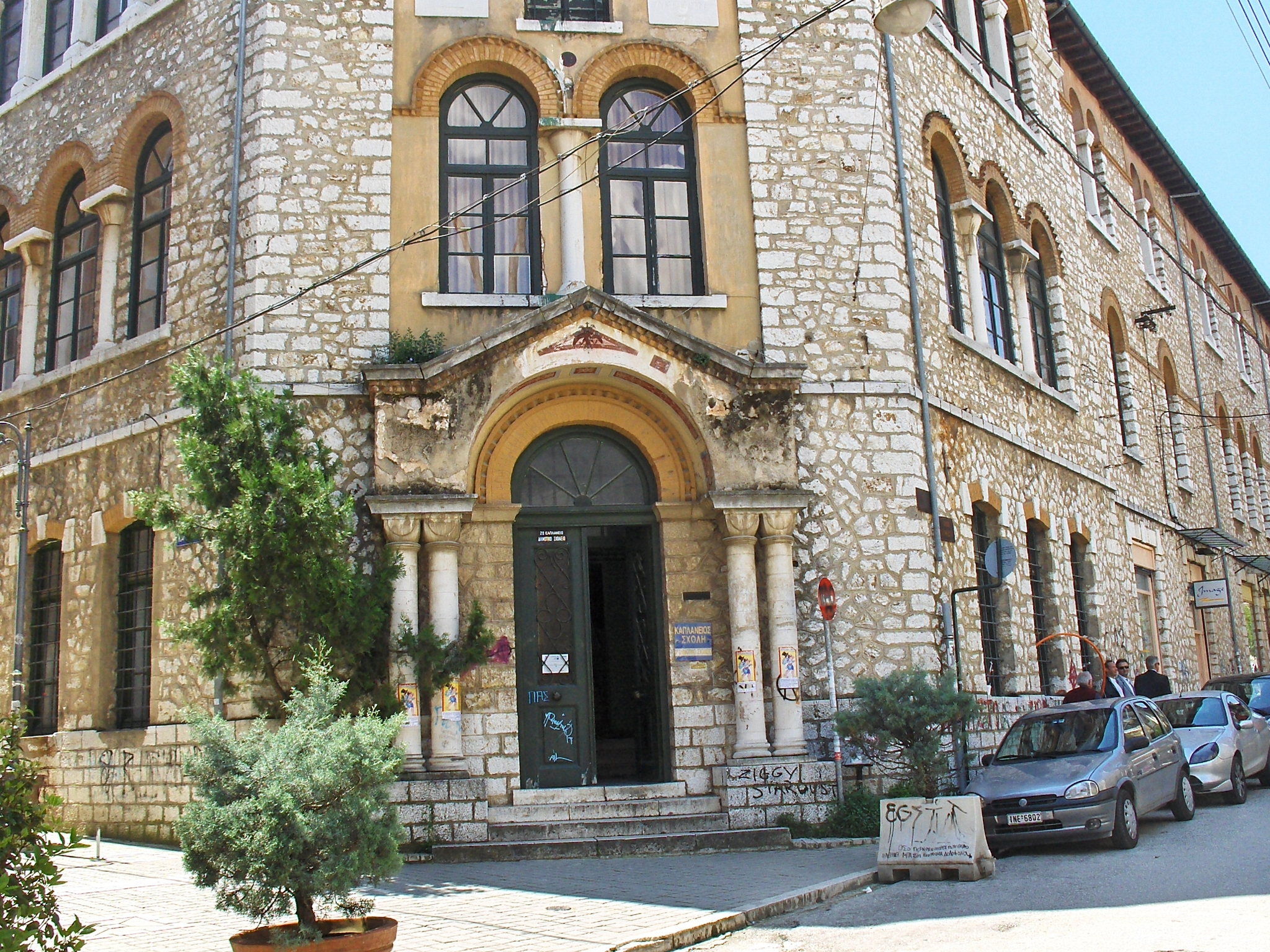
Kaplaneios School in Neo-Byzantine style, Ioannina

=== Antiparochi laws ===
In 1929, two important laws concerning apartment buildings took effect. The law about "horizontal property" made it possible that many different owners own one apartment building, each by owning one or more apartment units. Theoretically, each apartment corresponds to a percentage of the original plot. The most important effect of this law was the practice of "αντιπαροχή" (Antiparochí, literally "a supply in exchange"). With antiparochí, the owner of a plot, who can't afford to build an apartment building by himself, makes a contract with a construction company so that the latter will build the apartment building but keep the ownership of as many apartments as the contract states. Although during the inter-war period the practice of antiparochí was limited, as the construction of most apartment buildings was financed solely by the original owners of the plot, antiparochí became the most common method for financing the construction of condominiums (polykatoikíes) from the 1950s onwards. However this practice had the negative effect of the destruction of many old-era (mostly of 19th century) buildings and mansions in the major Greek cities, to be replaced by common apartment buildings. Even today (2019), the owners of old buildings or mansions, listed as architecturally preserved, prefer to let them collapse to avoid the preservation cost and exploit the plot.

=== Italian fascist architecture ===
Within the borders of modern Greece, there are also works by Italian architects in the Dodecanese, which were ruled by Italy from 1912 to 1947. The most notable examples are Palazzi del Governo in Rhodes and Kos.

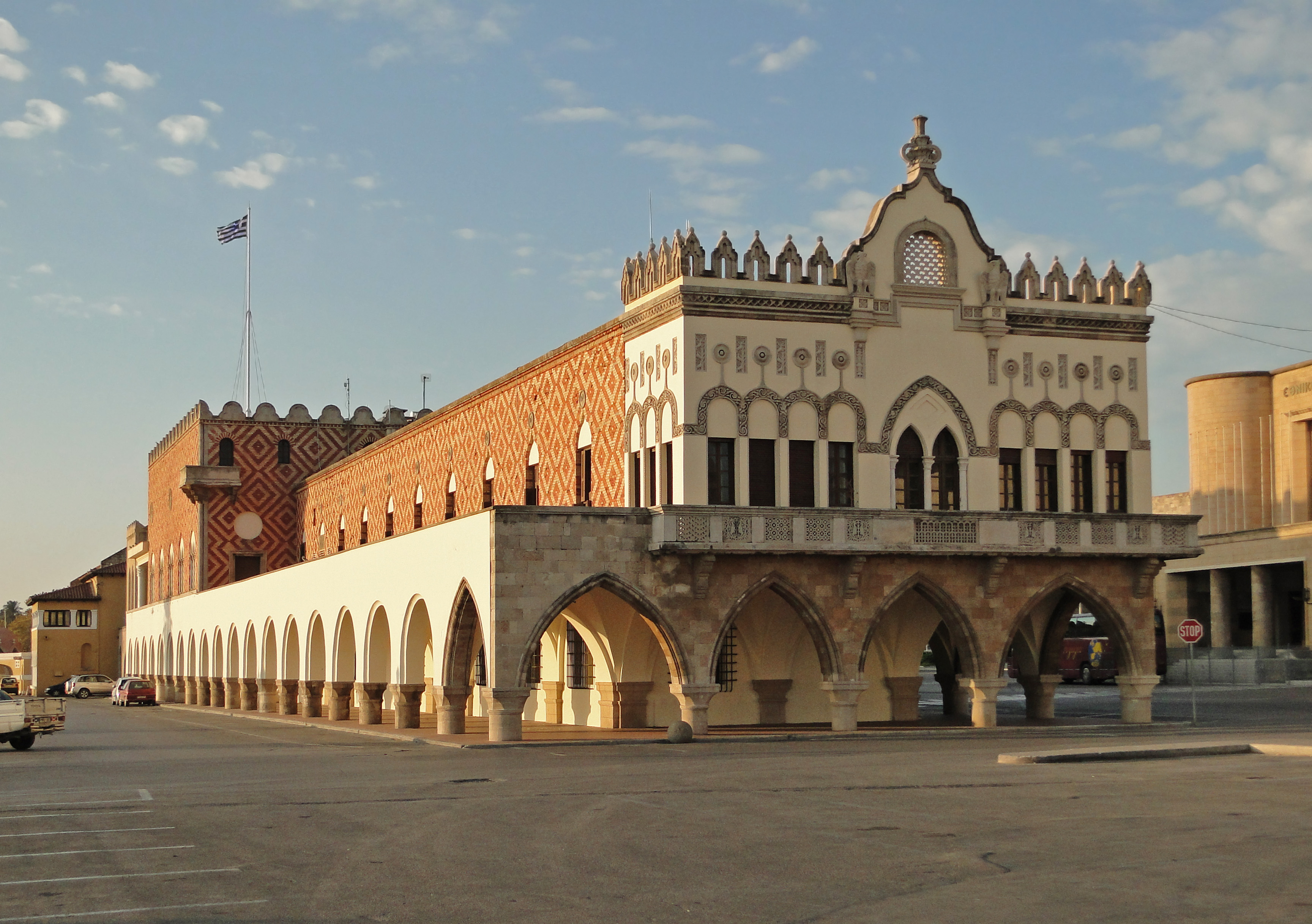
Palazzo del Governo (today the offices of the Prefecture of the Dodecanese) in Rhodes by Florestano Di Fausto (1926)

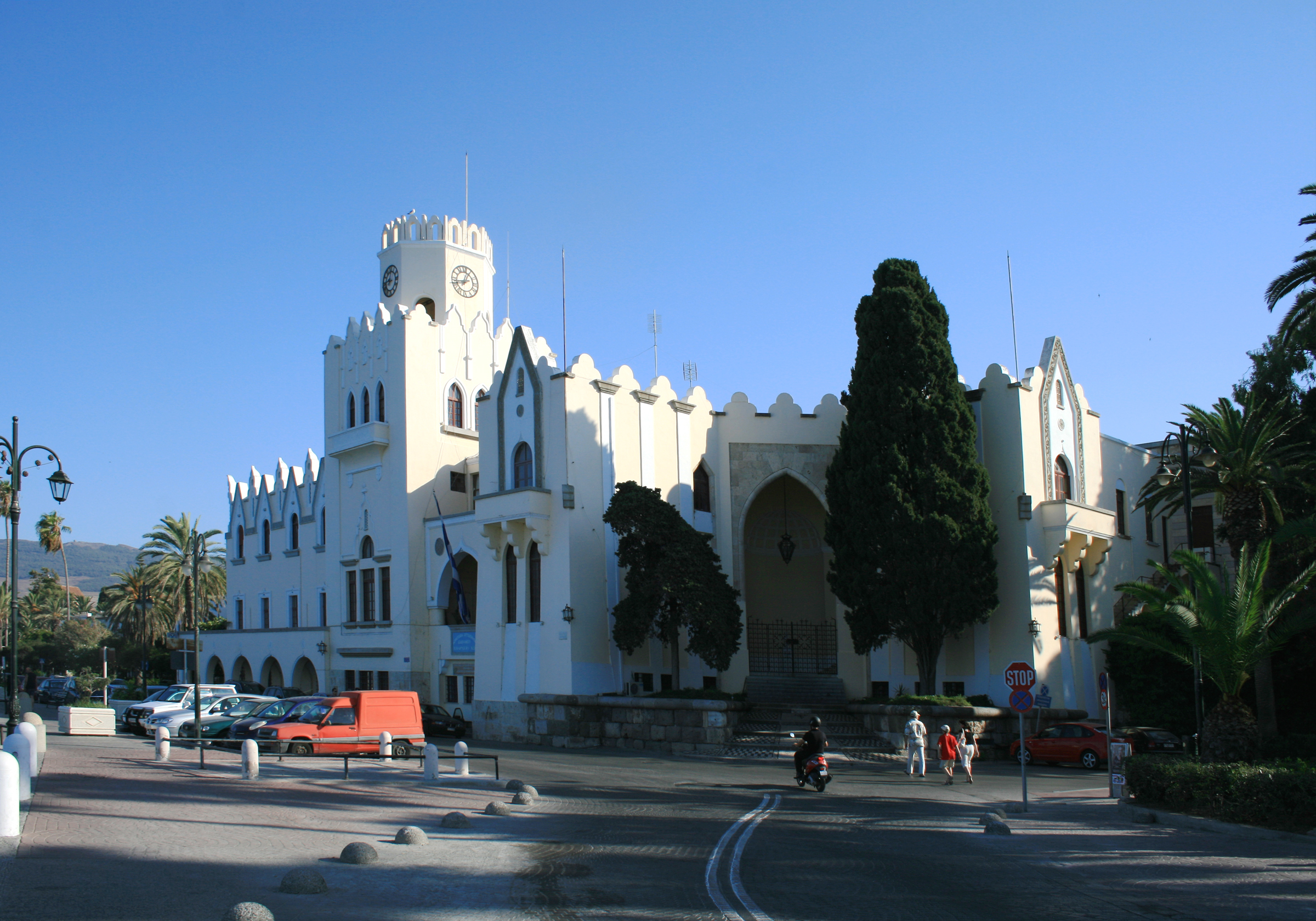
Palazzo del Governo, now Town Hall in Kos by Florestano Di Fausto (1930)

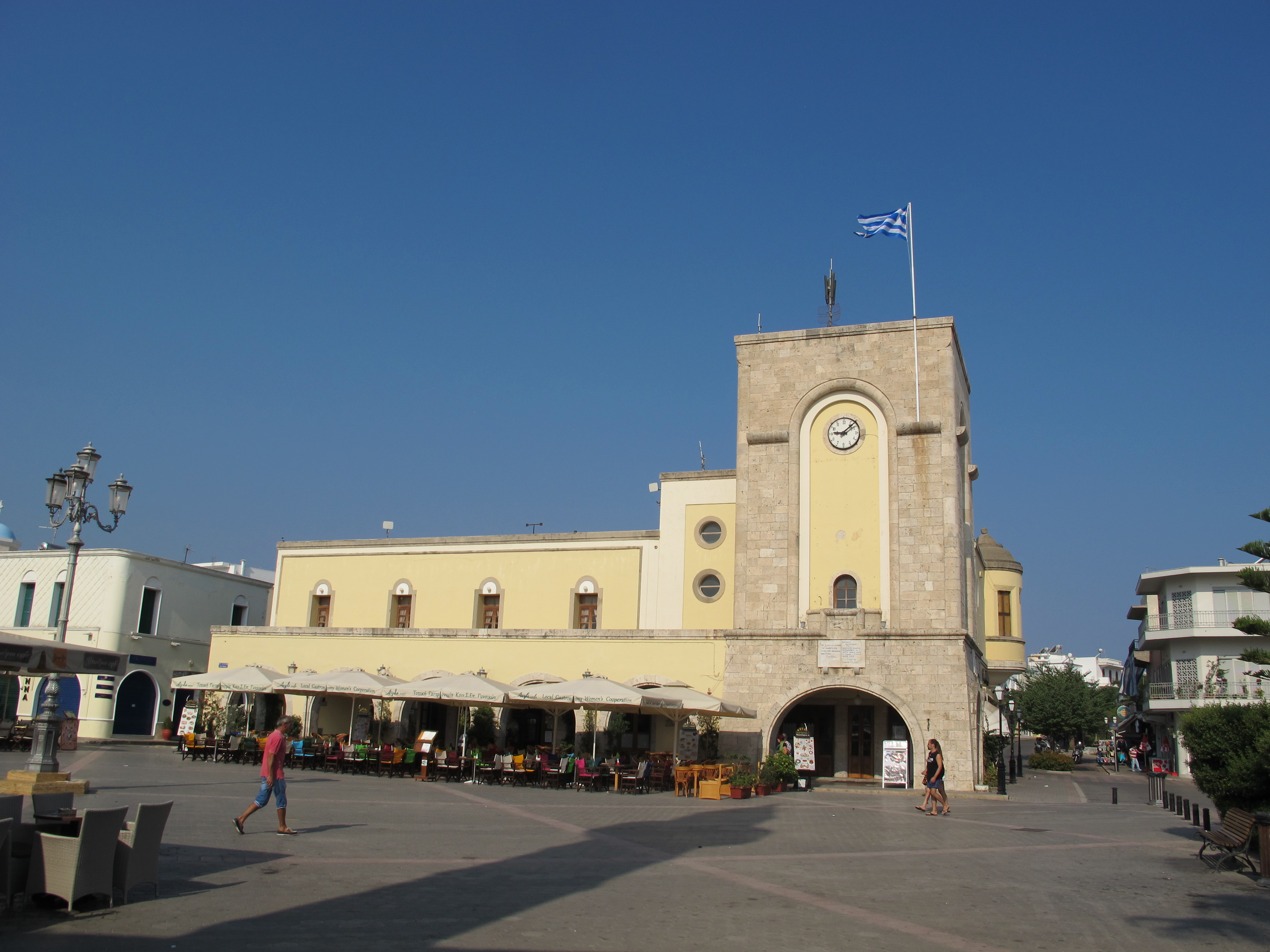
Former Casa del Fascio in Kos by Armando Bernabiti (1935)

National Theatre of Rhodes by Armando Bernabiti (1937)

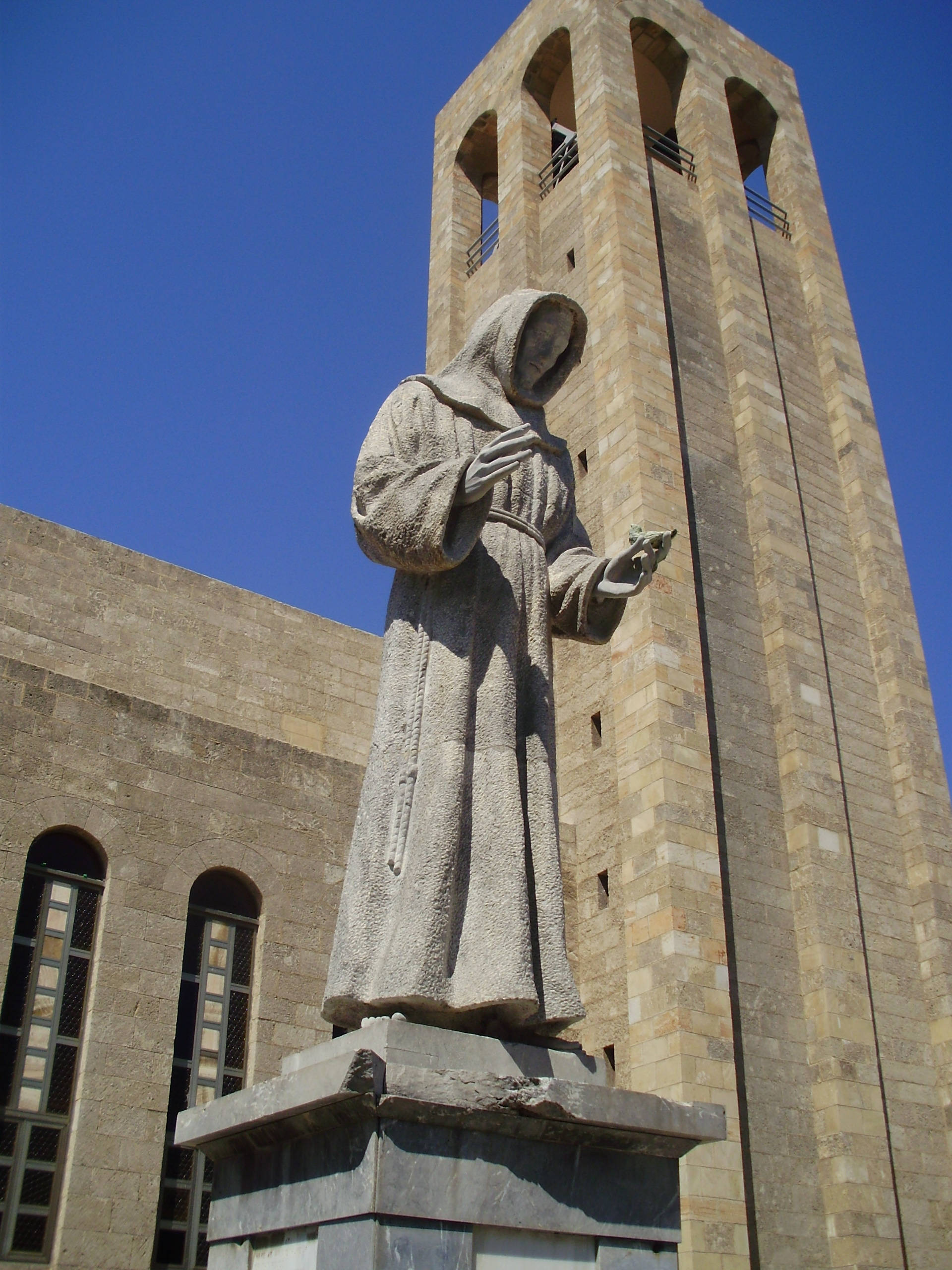
St. Francis of Assisi Cathedral, Rhodes by Armando Bernabiti (1939)

=== Modernism ===
In 1933 was signed the Athens Charter, a manifesto of the modernist movement which published later by Le Corbusier. Architects of this movement were among others the Bauhaus-architect Ioannis Despotopoulos, Dimitris Pikionis, Patroklos Karantinos and Takis Zenetos.

After World War II and the Greek Civil War, this practice (the massive construction of condominiums in the major Greek city-centres) was a major contributory factor for the Greek economy and the post-war recovery. The first skycrapers were also constructed during the 1960s and 1970s, such as the OTE Tower and the Athens Tower Complex.

During the 1960s and 1970s, Xenia was a nationwide hotel construction program initiated by the Hellenic Tourism Organisation (Ελληνικός Οργανισμός Τουρισμού, EOT) to improve the country's tourism infrastructure. It constitutes one of the largest infrastructure projects in modern Greek history. The first manager of the project was the architect Charalambos Sfaellos (from 1950 to 1958) and from 1957 the buildings were designed by a team under Aris Konstantinidis.

Famous foreign architects who have also designed buildings in Greece during the 20th century, include Walter Gropius and Eero Saarinen.

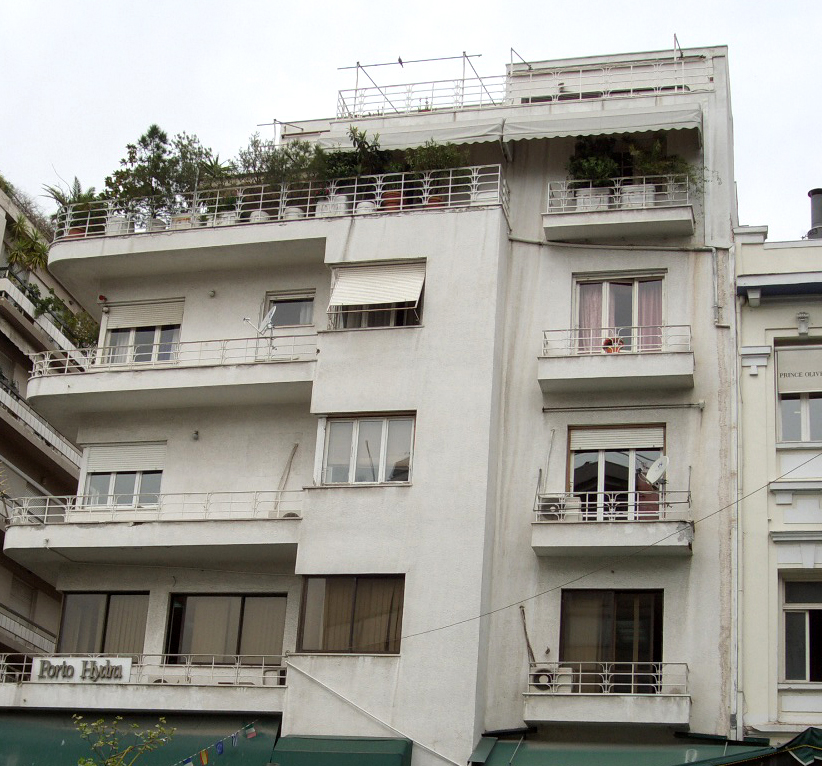
Interwar condominium in Athens. Similar apartment buildings (polykatoikía), created with the antiparochí system, are found in many Greek cities.

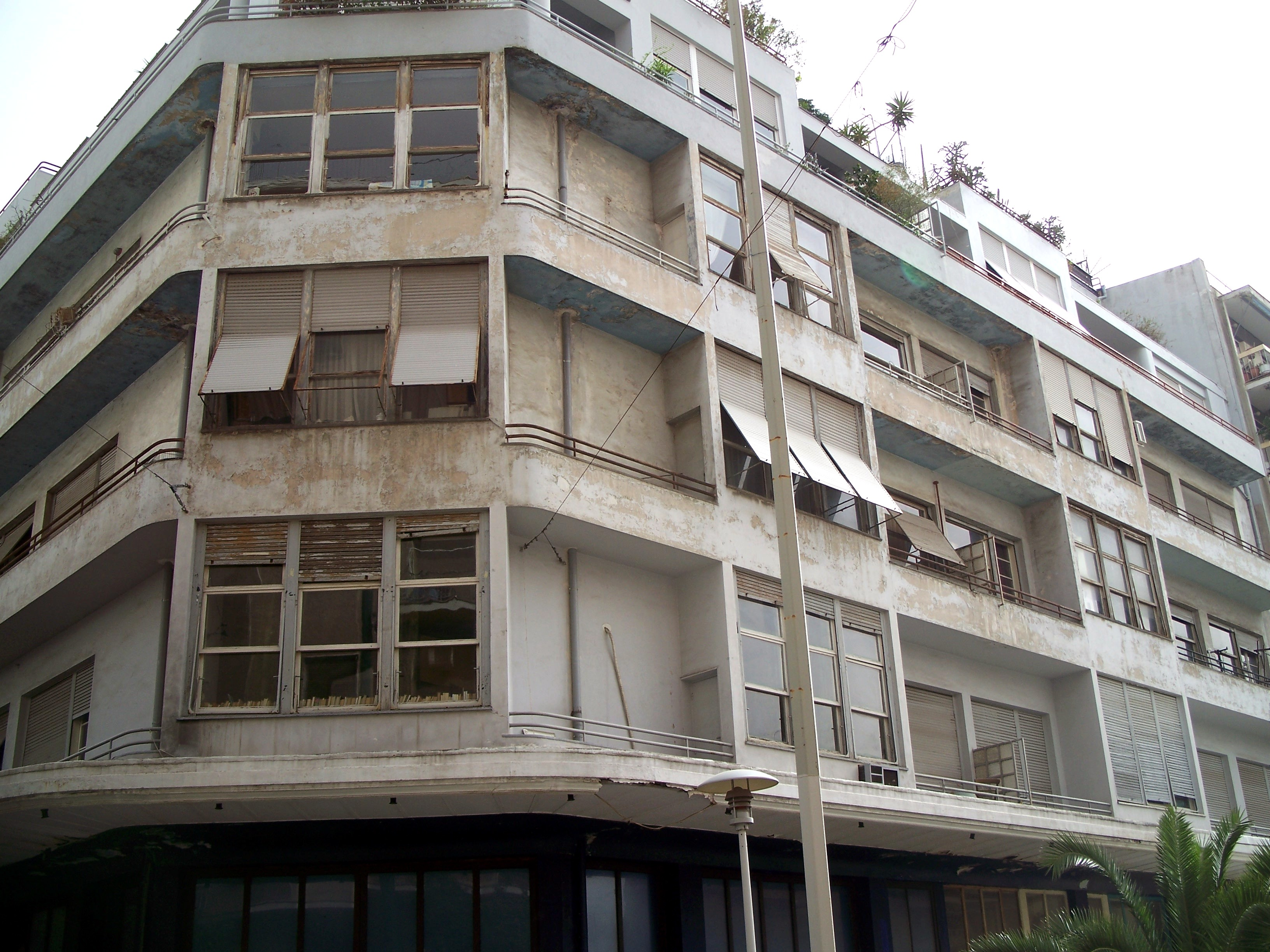
The Blue Condominium in Athens by Kyriakos Panagiotakos (1932)

Apartment building on Stournari and Zaimi Streets in Athens by Thoukydidis Valentis and Polyvios Michailidis (1933)

Apartment buildings for refugees on Alexandras Avenue in Athens by Kimon Laskaris and Dimitrios Kyriakos (1933)

OTE building near Victoria Square by Kostas Kitsikis (1961)

Athens Conservatoire by Ioannis Despotopoulos (1976)

Embassy of the United States, Athens, by Walter Gropius (1961)

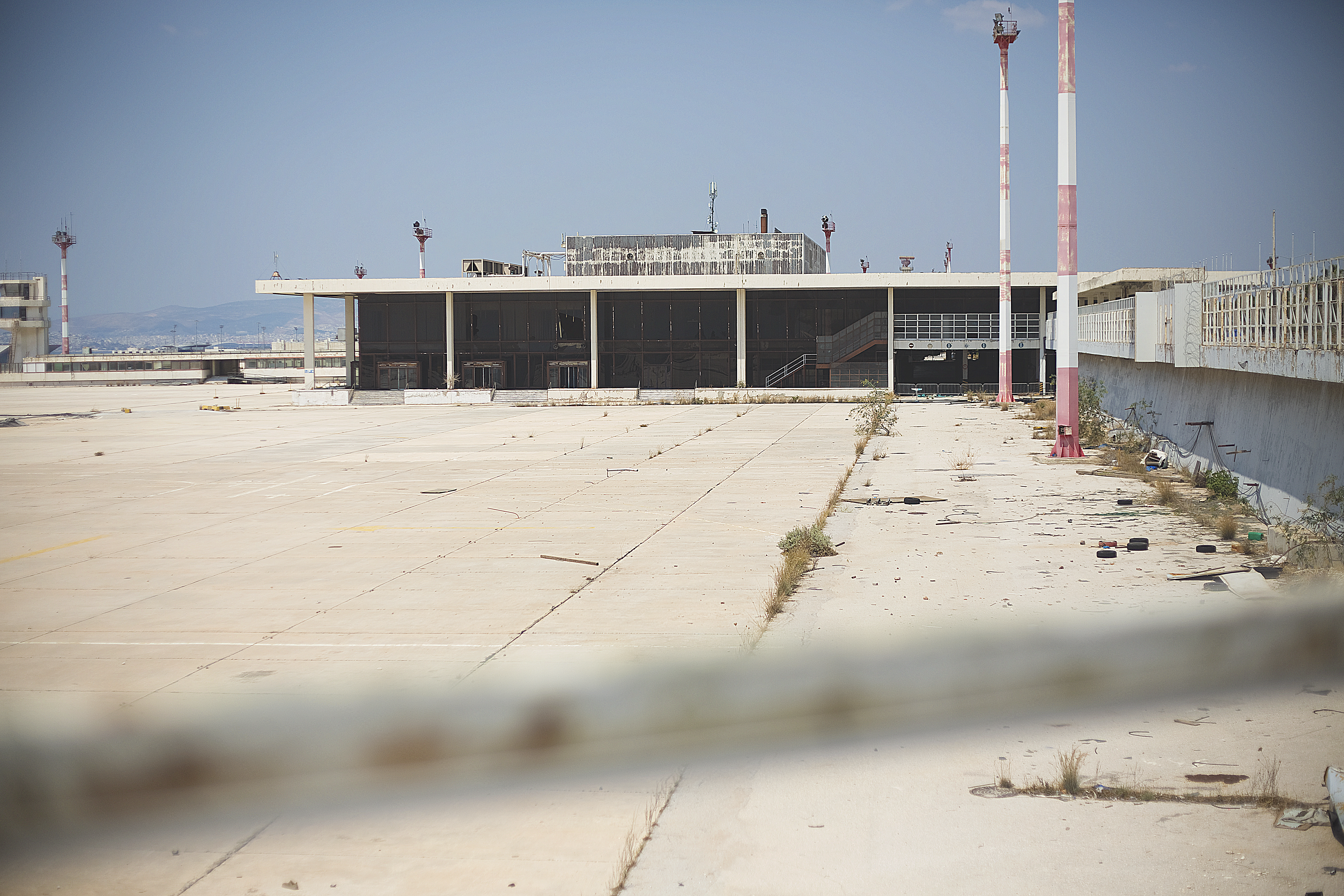
Ellinikon International Airport by Eero Saarinen (1969)

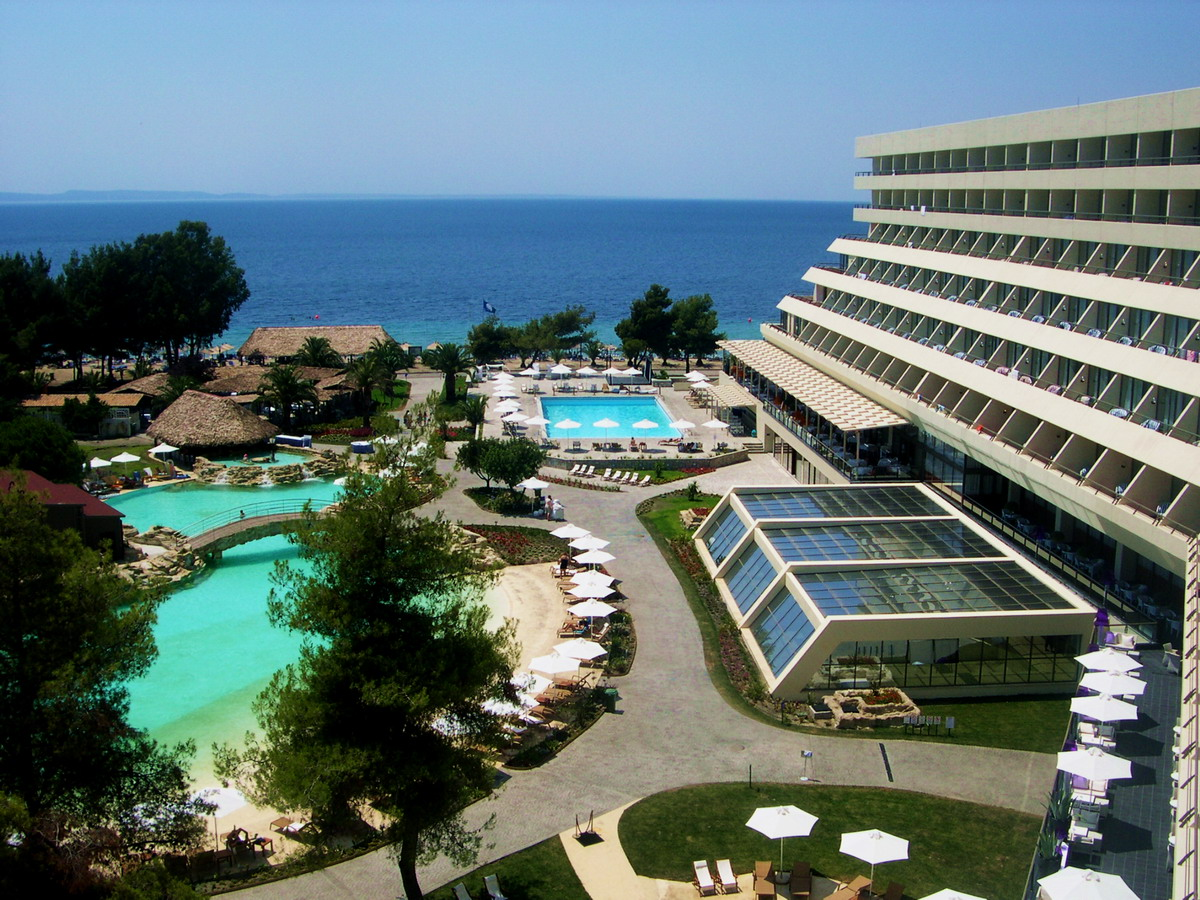
Porto Carras on Chalkidiki peninsula by Walter Gropius (1973)

Peace and Friendship Stadium (1985)

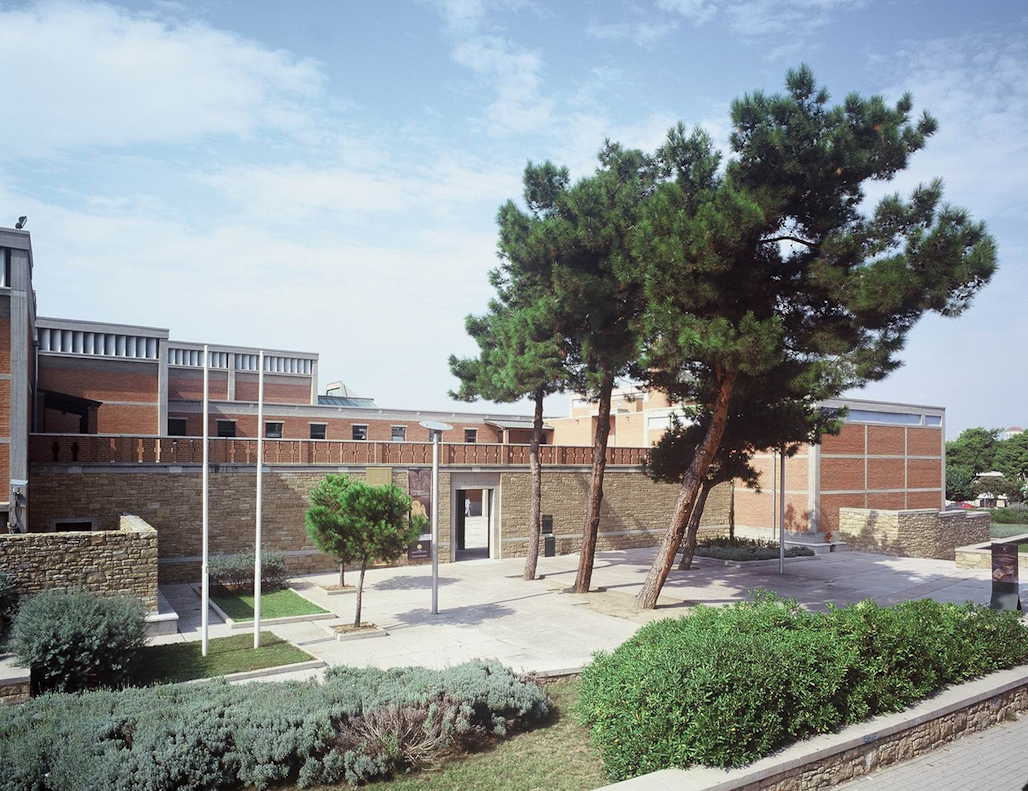
Museum of Byzantine Culture in Thessaloniki by Kyriakos Krokos (1993)

=== Postmodernism and contemporary architecture ===
Famous foreign architects also designed severals buildings in Greece in the 21st century. Santiago Calatrava constructed buildings for the 2004 Athens Olympics, while Mario Botta designed the new building of the National Bank of Greece. Recently Bernard Tschumi designed the New Acropolis Museum, Arata Isozaki the new Thessaloniki Concert Hall and Renzo Piano the Stavros Niarchos Foundation Cultural Center.

National Bank of Greece headquarters by Mario Botta (2001)

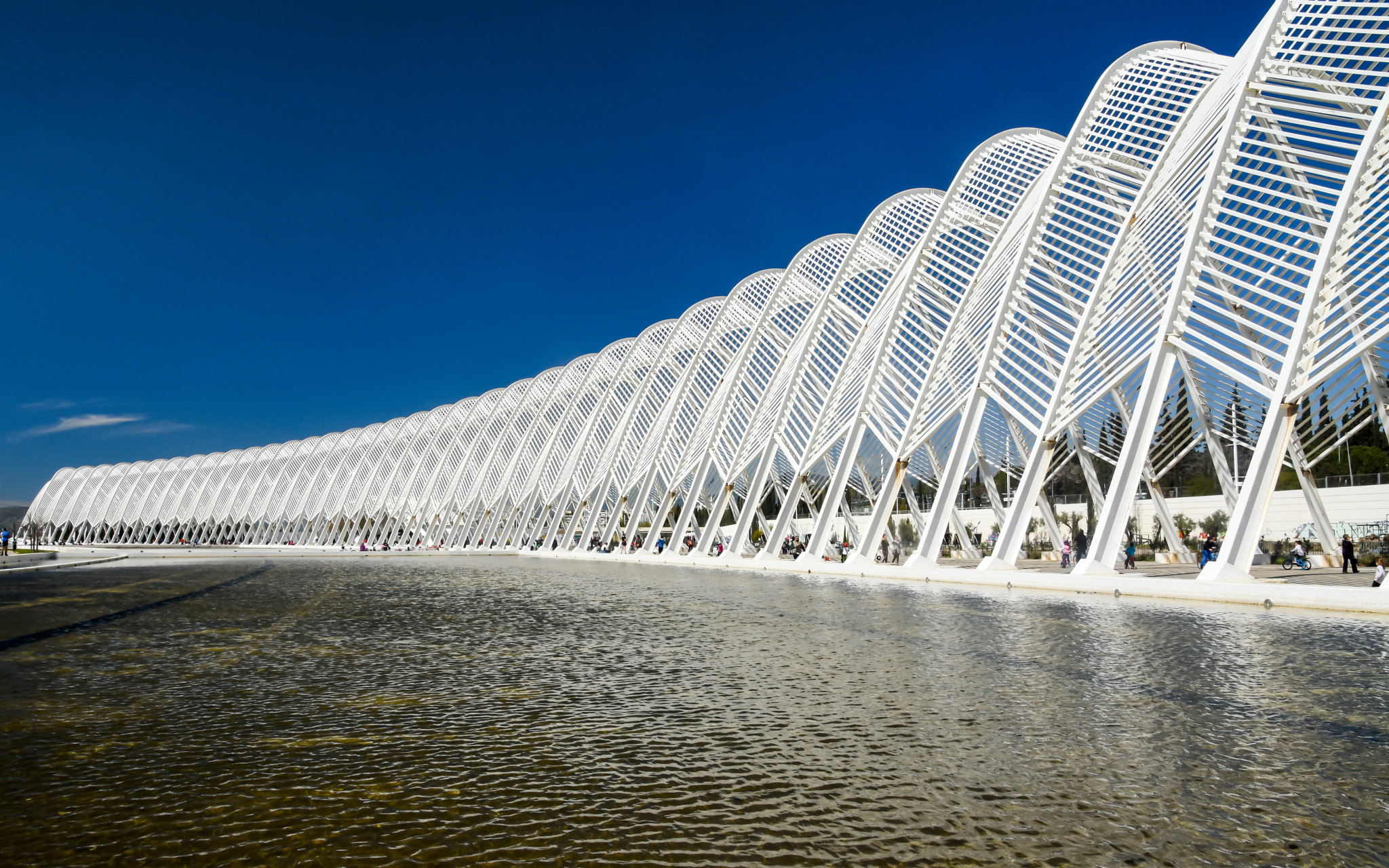
Athens Olympic Sports Complex by Santiago Calatrava (2004)

Acropolis Museum by Bernard Tschumi (2009)

Thessaloniki Concert Hall by Arata Isozaki (2010)

Stavros Niarchos Foundation Cultural Center by Renzo Piano (2016)

== See also ==
- Ancient Greek architecture
- Greek Revival architecture
- Modern architecture in Athens
- Mycenaean Revival architecture
