= Aris Konstantinidis =

Greek architect (1913–1993)

Aris Konstantinidis Άρης Κωνσταντινίδης
- Born: 4 March 1913; Athens, Greece
- Died: 18 September 1993 (aged 80); Athens, Greece
- Occupation: Architect
- Known for: Introduced modern architecture to Greece
- Children: Dimitri Konstantinidis, Alexandra Konstantinidi

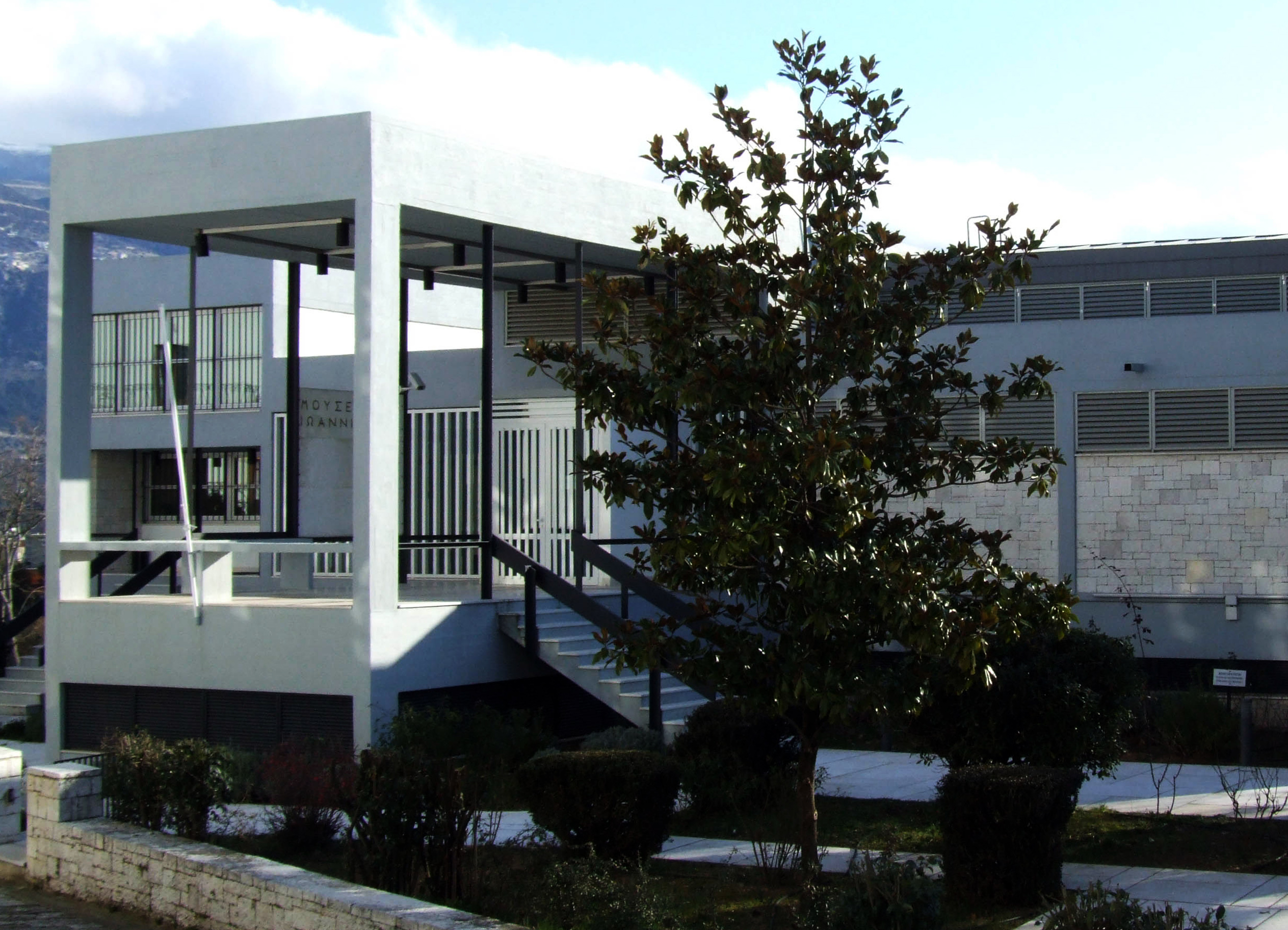
Ioannina Archaeological Museum

Aris Konstantinidis (Greek: Άρης Κωνσταντινίδης; 4 March 1913 – 18 September 1993) was a Greek modernist architect.

Aris Konstantinidis was born in Athens and studied architecture at the Technical University of Munich from 1931 to 1936, where he came into contact with the Modern Movement in architecture. He returned to Greece in 1936 and worked for the Town Planning Department of the city of Athens and for the Ministry of Public Works. He was appointed head of the Workers Housing Organisation from 1955 to 1975 and from 1957 to 1967 of the Technical Service of the Greek National Tourism Organisation, where he planned and oversaw the construction of a series of workers' houses and Xenia hotels. At the same time, Konstantinidis planned and realised several private projects such as the emblematic Weekend House in Anavyssos (1962).

He devoted extensive study to the anonymous architecture of Greece and between 1947 and 1953 published three books in which he examined particular examples of this type of architecture. In 1975 he published a comprehensive book concerning the anonymous architecture of Greece, entitled Elements of Self-knowledge: Towards a true architecture, in which it is apparent how much he was influenced by the architectural tradition of his homeland and how he drew lessons from the past to develop an architecture for his time. In his last book, entitled Theoktista ("God-built"), the architect once again underlined his belief that anonymous architecture as well as the landscape of Greece itself constituted the foundations on which modern architectural practice could and should be grounded.

He taught at the Zurich Polytechnic as a visiting professor from 1967 to 1970. In 1978 he received an honorary doctorate from the University of Thessaloniki. He was appointed a corresponding member of the Academy of Fine Arts, Munich.

Through his work, Aris Konstantinidis created architectural solutions unique in Greece, which gave birth to a modern Greek architecture. In the 1980s, his work was associated with the theory of critical regionalism by renowned architectural historians and theorists Alexander Tzonis & Liane Lefaivre and Kenneth Frampton.

== Personal life ==
In 1951 Konstantinidis married the famous Greek sculptor Natalia Mela. They had two children: Dimitris Konstantinidis is also an architect and Alexandra Tsoukala is a light designer.

== Notable works ==
- Weekend House in Anavyssos
- Ioannina Archaeological Museum
- Xenia Hotel in Kalambaka
- Xenia Hotel in Mykonos
- Komotini Archaeological Museum
- Xenia Hotel in Olympia
- Low-income housing in Athens
- Low-income housing in Irakleio
- Low-income housing in Serres
- Low-income housing in Pyrgos

== Written works ==
- 1947- Two "Villages" from Mykonos (Δυο "Χωριά" από τη Μύκονο)
- 1950 - Old Athenian Houses (Τα παλιά Αθηναϊκά σπίτια)
- 1953 - Country churches of Mykonos (Ξωκλήσια της Μυκόνου)
- 1972 - Vessels for Life or The problem of a genuine architecture (Δοχεία Ζωής ή το πρόβλημα για μια αληθινή αρχιτεκτονική)
- 1975- Elements for self-knowledge - towards a true architecture (Στοιχεία αυτογνωσίας - Για μιαν αληθινή αρχιτεκτονική)
- 1978 - True contemporary architecture (Σύγχρονη Αληθινή Αρχιτεκτονική)
- 1987 - On architecture (Για την Αρχιτεκτονική)
- 1987 - Sinners and thieves or The take-off of architecture (Αμαρτωλοί και κλέφτες ή Η απογείωση της αρχιτεκτονικής)
- 1989 - Forewords from forthcoming books (Τα προλεγόμενα / από τα βιβλία που βρίσκονται στα σκαριά)
- 1991 - Wretched timeliness - The golden Olympics - The Acropolis Museum (Η άθλια επικαιρότητα - Η χρυσή ολυμπιάδα - Το μουσείο της ακρόπολης)
- 1992 - Experiences and facts - an autobiographical narrative (Εμπειρίες και περιστατικά - μια αυτοβιογραφική διήγηση)
- 1992 - The architecture of architecture - Notes from a Journal (Η Αρχιτεκτονική της Αρχιτεκτονικής- Ημερολογιακά σημειώματα)
- 1992 - Aris Konstandinidis - Projects & Buildings (Αρης Κωνσταντινίδης: Μελέτες και κατασκευές)
- 1992 - "God-Built" ("Θεόκτιστα")

== See also ==
- List of museums in Greece
