= Dimitris Pikionis =

Twentieth century Greek architect and painter

- Born: 1887; Piraeus, Greece
- Died: 28 August 1968 (aged 81); Athens, Greece
- Occupation: Architect

Demetrios "Dimitris" Pikionis (Greek: Δημήτριος (Δημήτρης) Πικιώνης; 1887–1968) was a Greek architect, and also painter, of the 20th century who had a considerable influence on modern Greek architecture. He was a founding member of the Association of Greek Art Critics, AICA-Hellas, International Association of Art Critics. His oeuvre includes buildings and urban planning in Athens and the entirety of Greece—including several schools and a playground in Filothei, Athens.

== Life and work ==
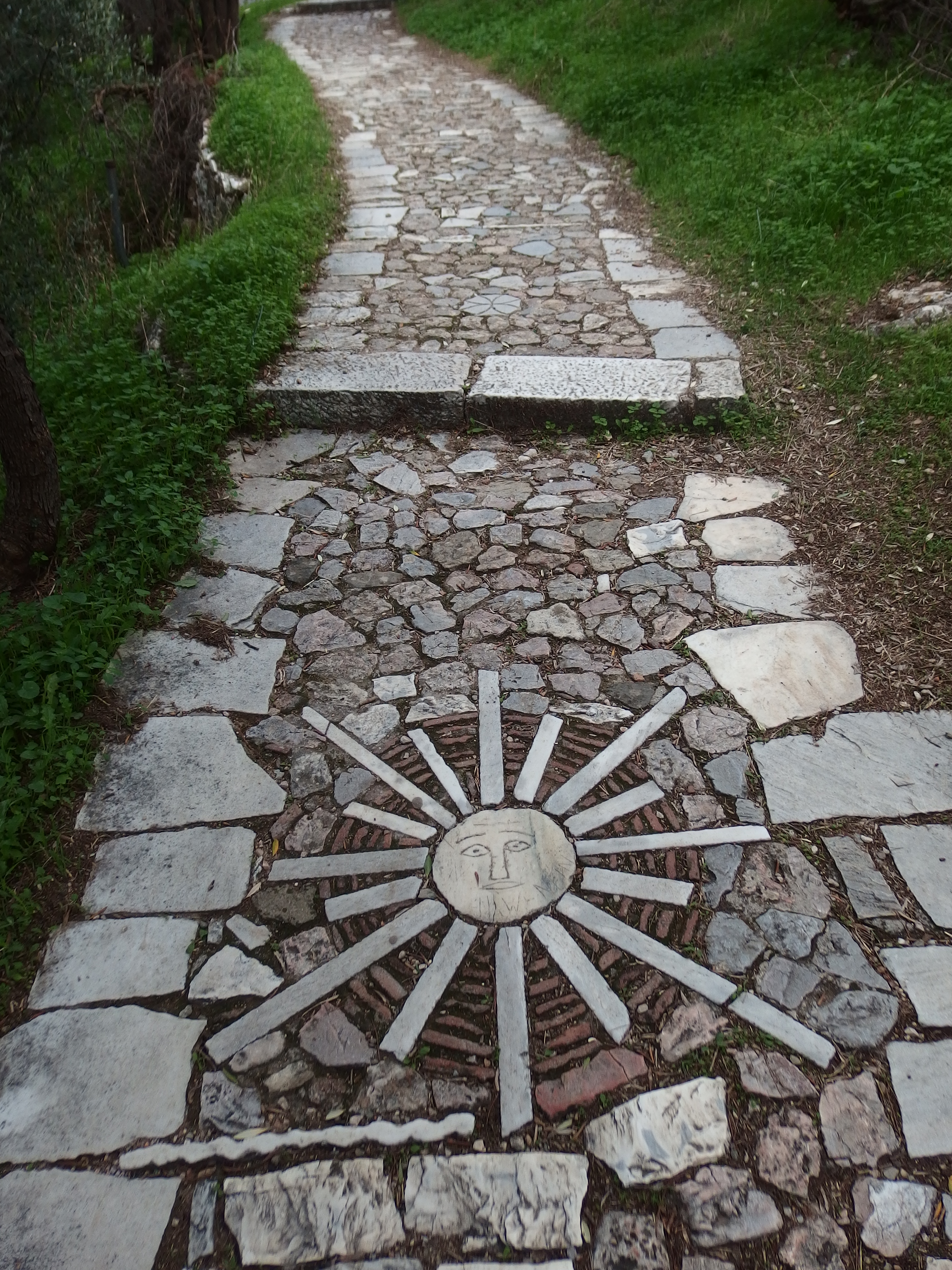
Athens, Philopappos Hill, path

He was born in Piraeus to parents of Chiot descent. He inherited his talent in painting from his father, who had an aptitude in the arts. In 1906, he became the first student of Konstantinos Parthenis, a distinguished Greek painter, while he was studying at the National Technical University of Athens civil engineering, graduating in 1908.

He then continued his studies in Paris and Munich, in sculpture and drawing. In Paris, he attended architecture classes at Ecole des Beaux Arts (Paris). Pikionis was back then introduced to the work of Paul Cézanne and became friends with Giorgio de Chirico. Some Greek painters of the time, such as Georgios Bouzianis and Periklis Giannopoulos, were influential figures during these formative years.

He returned to Greece in 1912 and after the Balkan Wars, he started studying and working in architecture during which period, he began shifting his focus on the study of the modern Greek architecture. In 1912, he began to document vernacular architecture on Aegina, notably the House of Rodakis, which he brought to greater attention. In 1921, he undertook a lecturer position at the 'Morphology' department at the National Technical University of Athens where he stayed until 1923. In 1925, he received a permanent position in the department of decoration as a professor.

Between 1930 and 1935, he co-published with his good friend, the painter Hadjikyriakos-Ghikas the magazine '3ο Μάτι' (translated as '3rd Eye') where he published many of his texts. The magazine collaborated with many artists and academics, such as Stratis Doukas, Takis Papatsonis, Sokratis Karantinos and others.

His first important work was Moraitis house in Tzitzifies (1921-1923). In 1932, upon the completion of the Elementary School in Pefkakia of Lykavittos, he came to the realisation that his works were not satisfactory and changed his aesthetic perceptions. All of his subsequent architectural works were based on the idea of bridging universalism with regionalism. In the 1940s and 1950s, his architectural creation was limited to designs for graves. However, in the following period, from 1951 to 1957, he was involved in many projects. Among them is the formation of the archaeological site around the Acropolis and Philopappou hill, perhaps his most important work, and the tourist pavilion of St. Demetrios Loubardiaris, seeking its ideal. In 1958, after 35 years of NTUA as a professor, he retired. In 1966 he was elected a full member of the Academy of Athens.

He has been often described as a founding father of critical regionalism by notable architectural historians and theorists, including Alexander Tzonis, Liane Lefaivre and Kenneth Frampton. In 1933, Pikionis with other Greek architects signed the Athens Charter, a manifesto of the modernist movement which published later by Le Corbusier. However he didn't embrace completely the new movement. The leitmotif in his work has been, according to architecture historians, the epiphany, the contrast between bleached marble and sodden soil.

He died in Athens on 28 August 1968.

== Legacy ==
Although he actually built few buildings, Pikionis is revered for the landscaping work in pedestrian areas around the Acropolis of Athens, a work done in the 1950s. Utilizing rough-finished marble in various shapes that appear irregular, yet are strictly geometric, and incorporating expertly chosen local flora on his terraces and steps, Pikionis' work has astounded visitors to the area and remains highly thought of ever since. He utilized similar techniques in creating the children's playground of the municipality of Filothei, an affluent Athens suburban area.

== Notable works ==
- Lycabettus School
- Moraitis House, Tzitzifies, 1921-1923
- Kotopouli Theatre, 1932
- Primary School of Pefkakia, 1932
- Experimental School of Thessaloniki, 1933
- Landscaping of the Acropolis of Athens surrounding area, 1954–57
- Filothei playground, 1961–64
- Hotel Xenia, Delphi
- City Hall of Volos, Volos
- Pourris House, Athens view
