= Karen Aabye =

Danish writer (1904-1982)

- Karen Aabye
- Born: 19 September 1904; Copenhagen
- Died: 15 September 1982 (aged 77); Bagsværd, Denmark
- Occupations: Journalist (1929-1939); Writer (1939-1982)
- Writing career
- Language: Danish

Karen Lydia Aabye (19 September 1904 – 15 September 1982) was a Danish writer. In the late 1930s, she worked as a journalist in Paris and London before she gained popularity with a number of historical novels in which strong-willed women were her main characters. Her works also include travel books and a collection of essays.

== Biography ==
The daughter of Rudolph Christian Aabye, a wholesale merchant from Norrebro, Aabye grew up in Copenhagen, attending Karen Kjær's School. After her school exams, she worked as an office clerk then became a well traveled journalist. In 1929, she went to Paris, where she spent three years working for the weekly Skandinaver i Paris. On her return to Denmark, she worked as an editorial secretary for Politikens Lytterblad. From 1936 to 1937, she was a foreign correspondent for Politiken, first in London and then in Paris. In 1937, she moved to the daily Berlingske Tidende with which she maintained a relationship for the rest of her working life. Her reports, commentaries and essays are evidence of her deep interest in the developments of the pre-war period.

After her debut novel, Der er langt til Paris (There is a lond way to Paris) in 1939, her breakthrough as a novelist came during World War II with a trilogy consisting of Det skete ved Kisum Bakke (It happened at Kisum Bakke) in 1942, Fruen til Kejsergården (The Lady of the Emperor) in 1943 and Vi, der elsker livet (We who love life) in 1944 all of which trace developments in the life of a strong-willed woman living in the north of Zealand in the 19th century. Also popular was her Martine series (1950–54), a five-volume novel based in 19th-century rural Jutland and tracing the lives of people who emigrated to America. The series consists of Martine (1950), Min søn Janus (My son Janus) 1951, Brænd dine skibe (Burn your ships) 1952, Det gyldne land (The Golden Country) 1953 and Den røde dal (The Red Valley) 1954. Karen Aabye was also successful with her fictional biographies: Grevinden af Bagsværd (Countess of Bagsværd) 1958, and Min bedstemor er jomfru (My grandmother is a virgin) 1965.

In all her novels, her female characters excel in their reasoning, sensitivity and strength while her stories are situated in a variety of environments, convincingly depicting people from various walks of life: circus folk, farmers, emigrants or the aristocracy. All her stories have a happy outcome although in some cases the conclusion appears a little artificial.

She also wrote travel books based on her own experiences. These include Dejligt, at Amerika ikke ligger langt herfra (Nice that America is not far from here) 1949, and Irland — min tossed ø (Ireland - my tossed island) 1963. Her collected essays were published as Fra mit skovhus (From my forest house) in 1968.

== Aabye's villa ==
Aabye's villa in Bagsværd which she called Kisum Bakke, was designed by Elliot Hjuler and completed in May 1944. On 22 December 1944, the house was dynamited by the Brøndumbande terror group who sympathized with the Germans. Aabye who was a member of the Holger-Danske chapter of the Danish Resistance was not at home at the time. The house was rebuilt in 1945 and enlarged in 1956. Aabye died in Bagsværd on September 15, 1982 at the age of 77.

== Bibliography ==
- Der er langt til Paris, 1939
- En kvinde har alt, 1940
- Vi skal ikke ha' penge tilbage!, 1941
- Det skete ved Kisum Bakke, 1942
- Fruen til Kejsergården, 1943
- Vi, der elsker livet, 1944
- Jupiter glemmer aldrig, 1945
- Vi skal snart hjem, 1946
- Flugten til Sverige, 1947
- Kvinde, gå mod solen, 1947
- Branden Magasin du Monde, 1948
- Dejligt, at Amerika ikke ligger langt herfra, 1949
- Martine, 1950
- Ferie i himlen, 1951
- Min søn Janus, 1951
- Brænd dine skibe, 1952
- Det gyldne land, 1953
- Grønt er mit hjerte, 1953
- Den røde dal, 1954
- Skibet er ladet med, 1954
- Den første ørkenbrand, 1955
- Italiensk romance, 1955
- Lille gule sky, 1957
- Grevinden af Bagsværd, 1958
- Vi kan sagtens, 1958
- Iwan, 1959
- Vi er så unge, 1961
- Irland—min tossed ø, 1963
- Min bedstemor er jomfru, 1965
- Pesten går i rødt, jomfru Dorthe, 1966
- Ursula, 1967
- Fra mit skovhus, 1968
- Constance, 1972
- Grønne horisonter, 1973
- Ørnens rede, 1974
- Da jeg så Robert, 1979
- Dyr der krydsede min vej, 1980
