= Natalia Mela =

Greek sculptor (1923–2019)

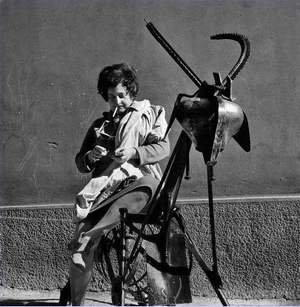
- Born: 1923; Kifissia, Greece
- Died: 14 April 2019 (aged 95–96)
- Education: Athens School of Fine Arts
- Spouse: Aris Konstantinidis
- Children: Dimitri Konstantinidis

Natalia Mela (Greek: Ναταλία Μελά; 1923 – 14 April 2019) was a Greek sculptor. She was the granddaughter of the fighter of the Macedonian Struggle Pavlos Melas and wife of architect Aris Konstantinidis.

== Biography ==
Natalia Mela born in Kifissia, Athens and grew up in an upper-class household with historical origins. She was the granddaughter of the "Makedonomachos" Pavlos Melas and Natalia Dragoumis. Her father was Michail Melas and her mother was the daughter of Ioannis Pesmazoglou, founder of the National Bank of Greece along with Georgios Stavros. Her grandmother from the side of her father was of the Dragoumi family and was the sister of Ion Dragoumis and daughter of Stephanos Dragoumis.

At 1942 she was enlisted at the Athens School of Fine Arts, with professors such as Kostas Dimitriadis and Mihalis Tompro. She worked at the workshop of Athanase Apartis. She then became a member of the United Panhellenic Organization of Youth, abbreviated EPON and of Greece's Communist Party (KKE). However, after the murder of Kitsos Maltezos she left both organizations.

After her graduation, at 1948, she worked for a period of time along her professor Dimitris Pikionis for a stele at the tomb of the bishop Chrysanthos and later for the Monument of the Fallen in Leontio, Nemea in the Peloponnese. She also constructed busts for Stephanos Dragoumis and Georgios Pesmazoglou, where the influence of Pikionis is obvious.

In a few years she opened her own workshop in a house in Vasilissis Sofias Avenue and later in Mourouzis Street. Where many Greek artists paid her visits such as Nikos Engonopoulos, Yannis Tsarouhis, Andreas Empirikos and Yiannis Moralis. She was a founder of the artistic team "Armos".

At 1951 she married the architect Aris Konstantinidis (1913–1993) with whom she had two children, Dimitri and Alexandra. For the next ten years she mainly worked for Karolos Koun's Theatre where she was responsible for the stage production.

== Artistic creation ==
Natalia Mela in the beginning worked with marble and rock, while in the end of 1960s, when she returned from Paris, where she had learned to work with oxygen, she instead focused more on metal, adopting the teaching of abstract art, which was at its heights at the period. This is the period where she abandoned the Hellenocentism of Athens and turned to Paris' Modernism. She used "ready-made" materials, which she bought from Athinas Street. She drew inspiration from subjects of nature, such as birds and animals (she has created many statues of crows, capricorns, taurs, goats and pigeons) and Greek mythology as well.
