= The House of Rodakis =

Historic house in Mesagros, Greece

The House of Rodakis (Greek: Το σπίτι του Ροδάκη) is an important work of vernacular Greek architecture, hailed as "the masterpiece of Aeginitan folk architecture." It was built in the village of Mesagros, on the island of Aegina, by Alexis Rodakis, beginning around 1884. Rodakis, who was a man of humble means, elaborated the farmhouse with sculpted figures, fresco painting, and inscribed poems. The house, as well as Rodakis, became a subject of interest for Greek modernist architects, notably Dimitris Pikionis and Georges Candilis, taking on “an almost mythical” status for these architects.

== The House ==
Alexis Rodakis was born sometime in the 1860s. He received minimal education and has been described as "an uneducated peasant." Rodakis began building the farmhouse by 1884, attested by a datestone on the main building. He continued to work on the house for the rest of his life, adding on additional rooms and buildings, including a small stable, chicken coop, oven, and dovecote. Rodakis lived in the house with his wife and eight children. He embellished the house with carved stone heads, animals, and decorative lintels over doorways and fireplaces.

Topping the facade of the house are four sculpted allegorical figures. According to Georges Candilis, Rodakis called these "the four columns" that held up the house: the snake (knowledge), the pig (happiness), the clock (time), and the eagle (power).

On one wall there is a poem inscribed in the plaster:

It would be better for a man

to be a cold stone

than to have thought

and reason and measure.

I learned to live.

ach-1891-vach.

[In Greek, “ach, vach!” is an expression of pain.]

In one room is a fireplace with left and right hands carved on either side. According to Georges Candilis, Rodakis traced his hands onto the fireplace at the end of his life to allow his friends to greet him after his death. Candilis recalls Rodakis as saying "And maybe, if you happen to come too, you can touch your hand on my hand, and say 'Good morning, Rodaki. How are you?'" When Candilis returned to the house after WWII, Rodakis was dead and many of the sculptures had been removed or damaged.

The house fell into ruin, but has been restored by its new owner, architect Dionysis Sotovikis.

== Reception and significance ==
At the beginning of the 1900s, the house caught the attention of the German archaeologist and art historian Adolf Furtwängler, who was excavating near Mesagros in the sanctuary of Aphaia from 1901 to 1903. He photographed the house and sent the photographs to Munich as an outstanding work of vernacular architecture. In 1912, the architect Dimitris Pikionis visited and made extensive drawings and photographs of the house, which are now part of the collections of the Benaki Museum. For Pikionis, the house was an touchstone of "primitive" architecture and "popular" (i.e. folk) architecture in Greece, which offered a source of inspiration for a new, yet authentically Greek, architecture. The house was the subject of a 1934 booklet "The House of Rodakis in Aegina" (Greek: "Το σπίτι του Ροδάκη στην Αίγινα") by painters Julio Kaimi and Klaus Vrieslander, which made use of Pikionis's drawings and photographs. Pikionis also encouraged his student, Greek-French architect Georges Candilis, to visit the house, which he did first in 1933 and again before the outbreak of WWII. Candilis later recorded his conversations with Rodakis from the 1930s, including Rodakis's symbolic interpretation of the sculpted figures.
