= Bagsværd =

Town in Denmark

- Neighbourhood
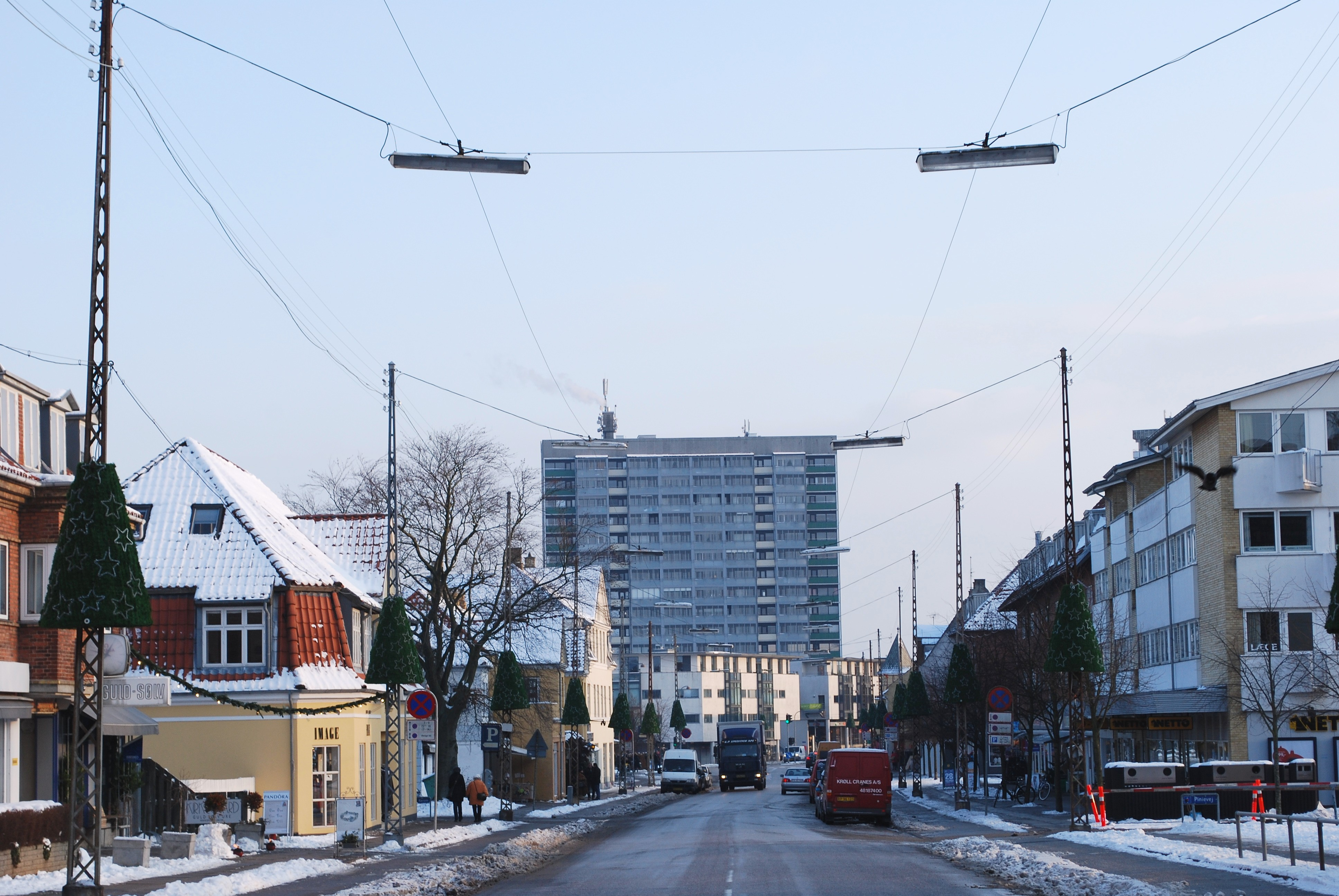
- Center of Bagsværd, with the Bagsværd Towers in the center

- Flag

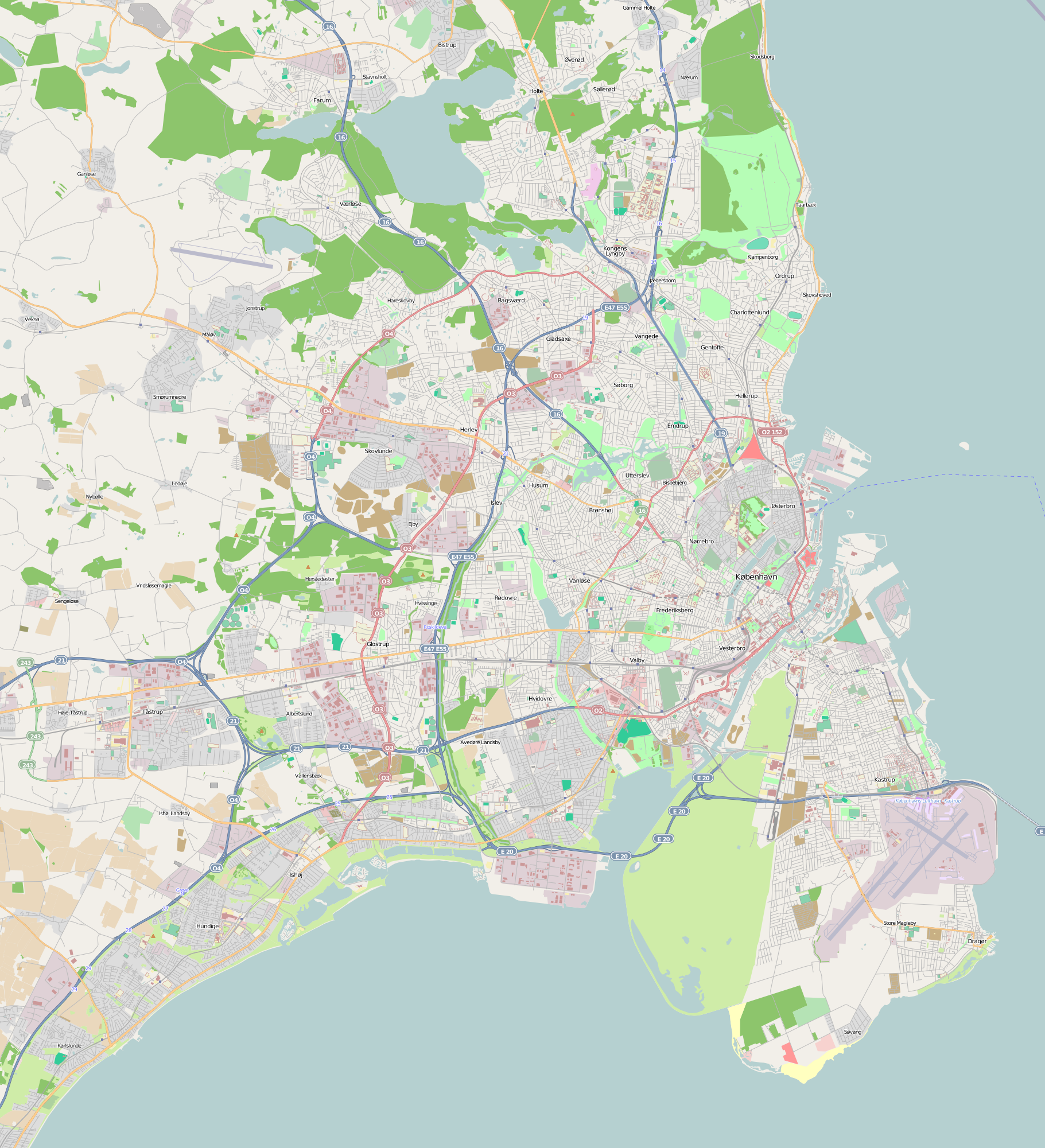
- Map of Copenhagen and its surrounding suburbs, Bagsværd in the top-left
- Country: Denmark
- Region: Hovedstaden
- Municipality: Gladsaxe Municipality
- Postal code: 2880

Bagsværd (Danish pronunciation: [ˈpɑwˌsveˀɐ̯]) is a middle-class suburb located approximately 12 km northwest of central Copenhagen, in the Gladsaxe Municipality. Bagsværd houses the headquarters of Danish pharmaceutical company Novo and biotechnology company Novonesis, as well as the Baltic and International Maritime Council.

== Landmarks ==
Bagsværd Church, designed by Jørn Utzon, is a contemporary church, known for its rounded interior vaulting and the lighting effects of its skylights.

== Education ==
Established in 1908, Bagsværd Kostskole og Gymnasium (Bagsværd Boarding School) is located in Bagsværd.

== Transport ==
Bagsværd is served by Bagsværd railway station, located in the central part of the suburb a short distance from its main artery Bagsværd Hovedgade. The station is situated on the Farum radial of Copenhagen's S-train network, a hybrid commuter rail and rapid transit system serving Greater Copenhagen.

== Notable people ==
- Eleonora Zrza (1797 in Bagsværd – 1862) a Danish opera soprano
- Karen Aabye (1904 – 1982 in Bagsværd) a Danish writer, lived in a villa called Kisum Bakke in Bagsværd from 1944
- Hugo Rasmussen (1941 in Bagsværd – 2015) a Danish bassist
- Lotte Koefoed (born 1957 in Bagsværd) a Danish rower and team bronze medallist at the 1984 Summer Olympics
- Hanne Boel (born 1958 in Bagsværd) a Danish singer.
- Thomas Guldborg Christensen (born 1984 in Bagsværd) a retired Danish footballer with 200 club caps
- Nikolas Nartey (born 2000 in Bagsværd) a Danish professional footballer of Ghanaian descent

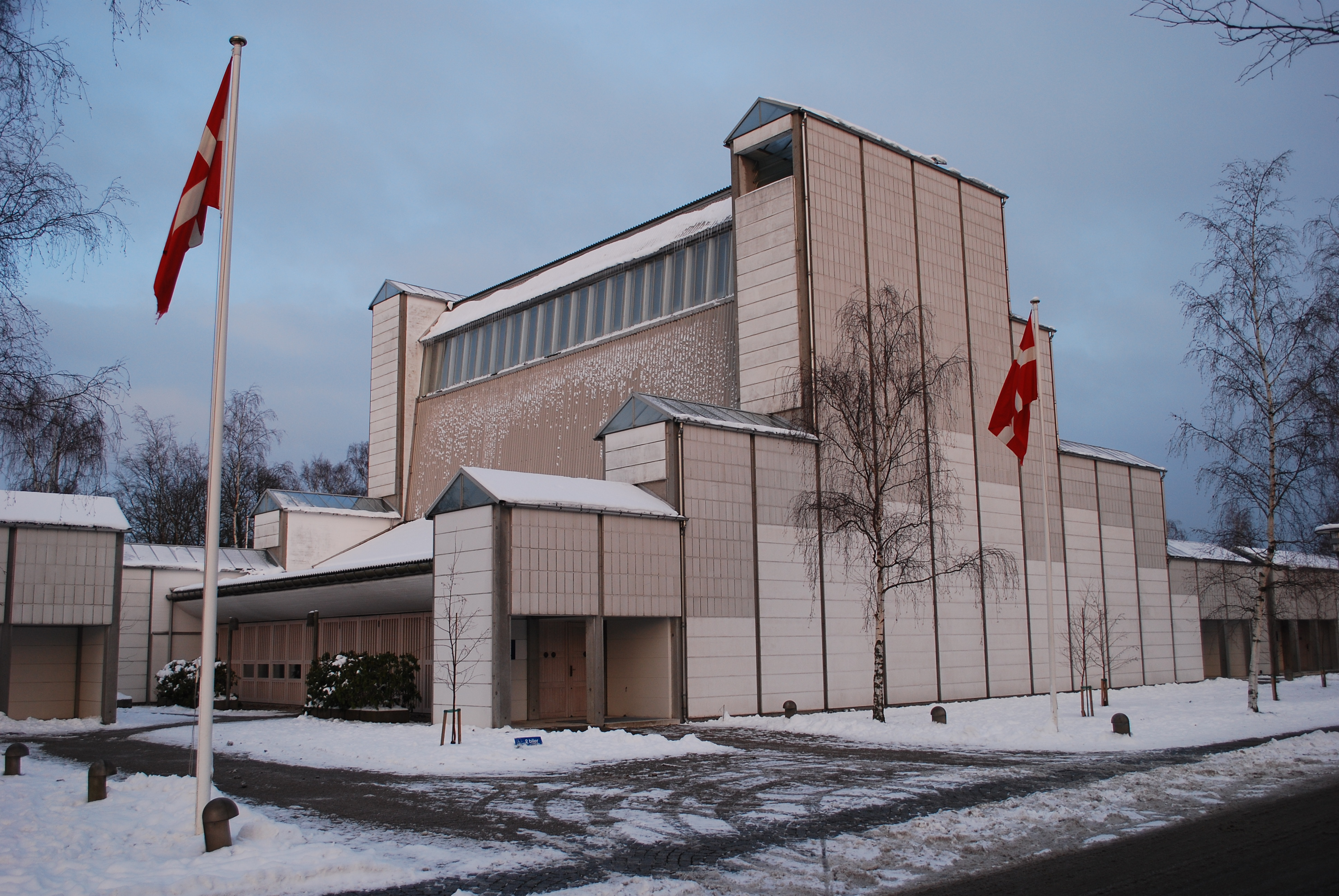
Church in Bagsværd
