= Bagsværd Church =

Lutheran church in Bagsværd, Denmark, designed by Jørn Utzon

Coordinates: 55°45′42″N 12°26′40″E

- Bagsværd Kirke
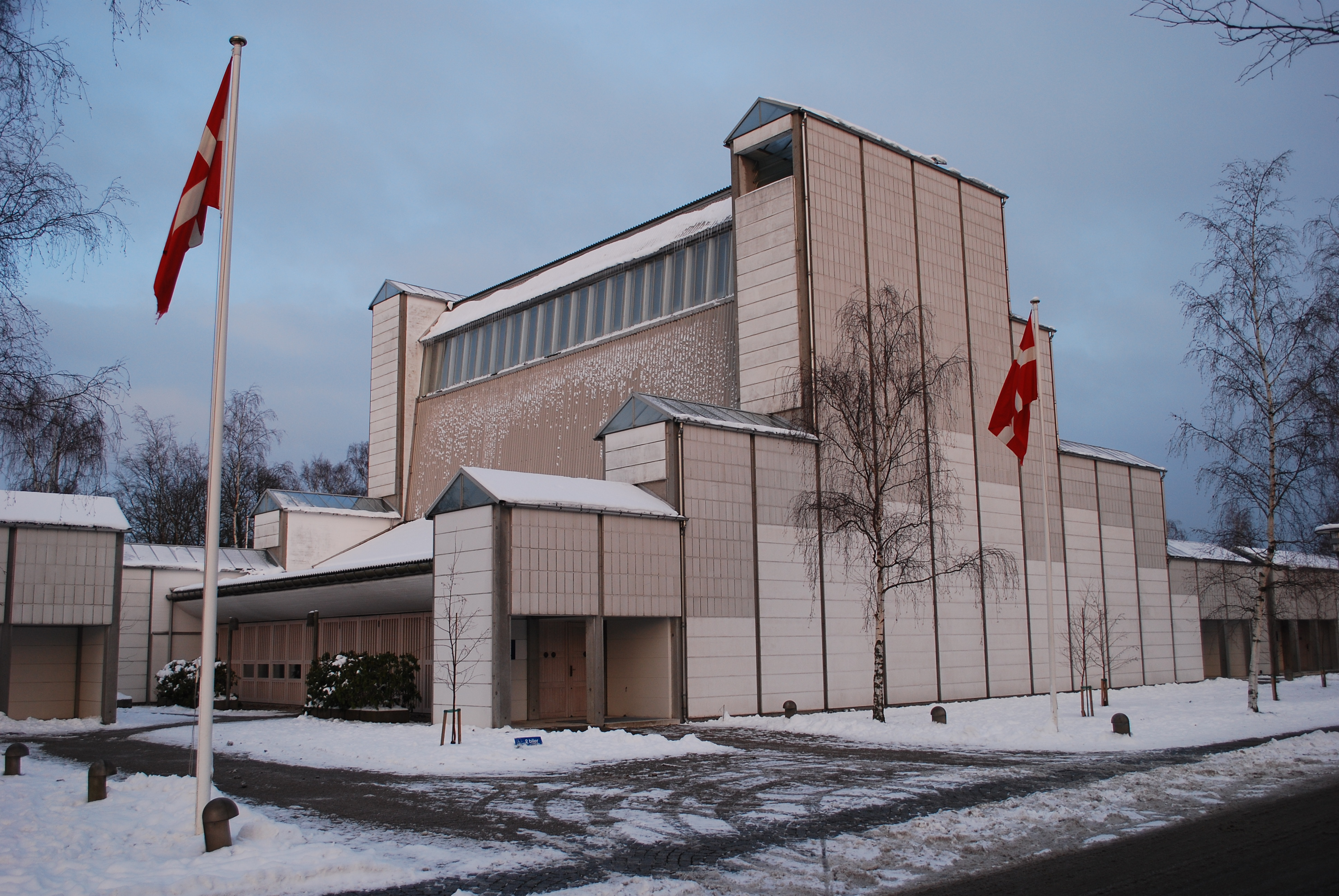
- Bagsværd Church
- Location: Bagsværd
- Country: Denmark
- Denomination: Church of Denmark

Architecture
- Architect: Jørn Utzon
- Years built: 1973–1976

Administration
- Diocese: Diocese of Helsingør
- Deanery: Gladsaxe-Herlev Provsti
- Parish: Bagsværd Sogn

Bagsværd Church is a Lutheran church in Bagsværd on the northern outskirts of Copenhagen, Denmark. Designed in 1968 by Jørn Utzon, it was completed in 1976. The building is considered to be a masterpiece of contemporary church architecture, especially its bright, naturally illuminated interior and its ceiling straddled with softly rounded vaulting.

== History ==
In 1538, the church in Bagsværd was pulled down on the orders of the king so that the stones could be used to repair the old Catholic bishop's palace which, after the Reformation, was to be used as a seminary for the new Lutheran Church. Thereafter, the parishioners had to use the church in Gladsaxe though there was increasing interest in building a new church in Bagsværd. It therefore came as no surprise that the congregational council took special interest in the church Utzon had included in a competition exhibit for the town centre in Farum when it was displayed in Gladsaxe at an architectural exhibition in 1967. When he was asked whether he would like to submit a proposal for a church at Bagsværd, Utzon was elated: "There I stood, and was offered the finest task an architect can have — a magnificent time when it was the light from above that showed us the way." The proposal he submitted the following year included four sketches: the first one showed a group of people under the clouds on a beach, the last one depicted the same people as a congregation in a church where the clouds had become the sculptural roof. They were intended to illustrate Utzon's understanding of the overall concept.

Conceptual sketch by Utzon

There were a series of difficulties over the funding of the building which finally cost DKK 10 million after Utzon had reduced its size by 10 percent and the Gladsaxe municipality had contributed DKK 1 million. A building permit was granted in 1973 but, experiencing financial difficulties, the church ministry quickly attempted to halt construction. However, before their ruling came into force, the contractors Christiani & Nielsen established a presence on the site allowing work to begin. The new church was consecrated on 15 August 1976.

== Architecture ==
Located on a narrow plot in a suburban setting, the building itself is narrow, and has an austere façade which encloses the various rooms and a number of small courtyards. Surrounded by birch trees, the exterior walls are faced with white prefabricated concrete panels and white glazed tiles. The aluminium roof gives the church a rather industrial look. Glass sections provide lighting over the connecting corridors. Covering an area of 1,700 square meters, the tight geometrical plan consists of three sections and a courtyard between two parallel corridors.

The rectilinear, modular structure of the building and its integrated courtyards, as well as the connecting corridors, are said to be inspired by the design of Buddhist temples in China.

=== The interior ===
The interior includes the nave and sacristy, offices, rooms for confirmation classes, a meeting room, and a whole section for youth activities. They are all linked by wide corridors which run both through the building and along the external walls where they are illuminated by skylights. The vaulted ceiling is made of reinforced concrete shells, only 12 centimetres thick and spanning 17 metres. The curved cylindrical shells rest on flanges supported by rows of double columns which act as flying buttresses.

=== Natural lighting ===
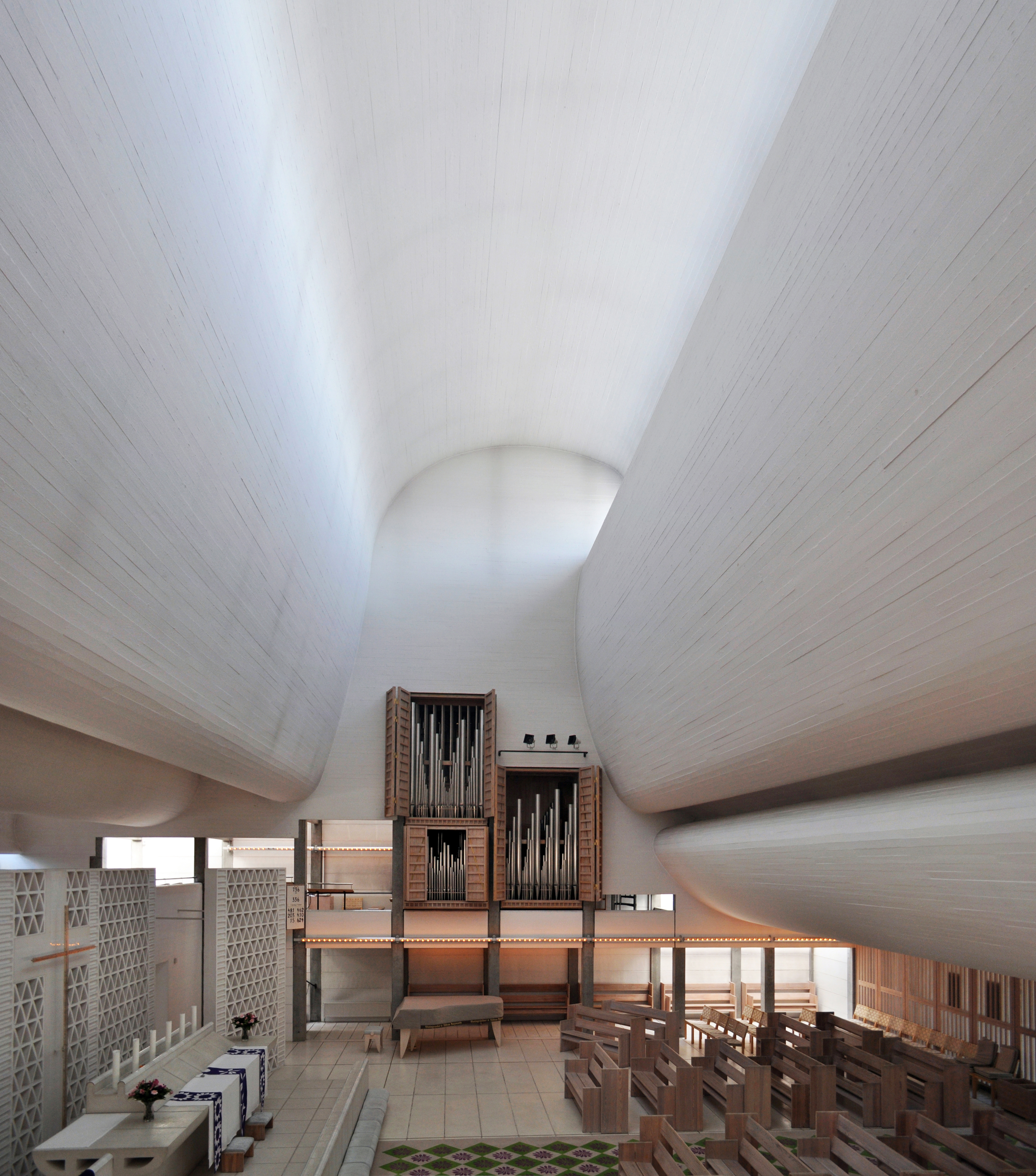
Interior: altar, organ and vaulting

A notable feature of the church is the natural lighting, facilitated by the all-white interior. It is achieved by means of high lateral windows across the entire width of the nave or, in the case of the smaller rooms, through sidelights bringing daylight in from the courtyards. In addition, there are extensive skylights which, in Utzon's words, result from "the inspiration that I derived from the drifting clouds above the sea and the shore [forming] a wondrous space in which the light fell through the ceiling — the clouds — down on to the floor represented by the shore and the sea." Indeed, Utzon was inspired to design the church when he was lying on a Hawaii beach, shortly after his premature departure from Australia as a result of disagreements over the Sydney Opera House. Contemplating a regular succession of cylindrical clouds, he concluded that they provided a perfect basis for modelling a church ceiling.

== Inventory ==
Utzon himself designed the altar wall which consists of an airy triangular grid of thin white tiles, known as Flensborg bricks, while the church's colourful textiles, carpeting and ceramic decorations were designed by his daughter, Lin Utzon. The organ, also designed by Jørn Utzon, was constructed in 1979 by Poul-Gerhard Andersen, with woodwork by Kurt Kærsgaard. The light pine pews as well as the church's concert piano, built by Steingraeber & Söhne in Bayreuth, were also designed by Utzon.

The church's four bells were designed by Thubalka in Vejle and cast at the Royal Eijsbouts bell foundry at Asten in the Netherlands.

== Assessments ==
The architectural critic Kenneth Frampton considers Bagsværd Church an outstanding example of critical regionalism owing to the synthesis it achieves between universal and regional cultures. He believes the design of the highly configurated concrete shell vault, unique in Western religious architecture, was inspired by the Chinese pagoda roof cited by Utzon in his essay "Platforms and Plateaus" (1963). Furthermore, the plan arrangement of the church's interior is reminiscent of Chinese Buddhist monasteries as described in a book by Johannes Prip-Møller.

From the outside, constructed in reinforced concrete and aluminium with glass-covered sections, the building looks more like a factory than a traditional church but inside it offers an impressive combination of soft, rounded shapes and sharp edges.

Writing in Berlingske Tidende on the occasion of the church's consecration, architectural correspondent Martin Hartung commented: "Bagsværd Church has turned into an architectonic attraction, an example of how Jørn Utzon can combine the technique and the art of building to form something transcending them both."

== The church today ==
The church forms an active part of the local community. In addition to regular church services, there are frequent concerts thanks to the choirs (including a Gregorian male choir and various children's choirs), the organ and the concert piano. Some of the concerts are free, thanks to contributions from the church council, others with visiting musicians require tickets for entry. The church also hosts exhibitions of paintings and artwork.

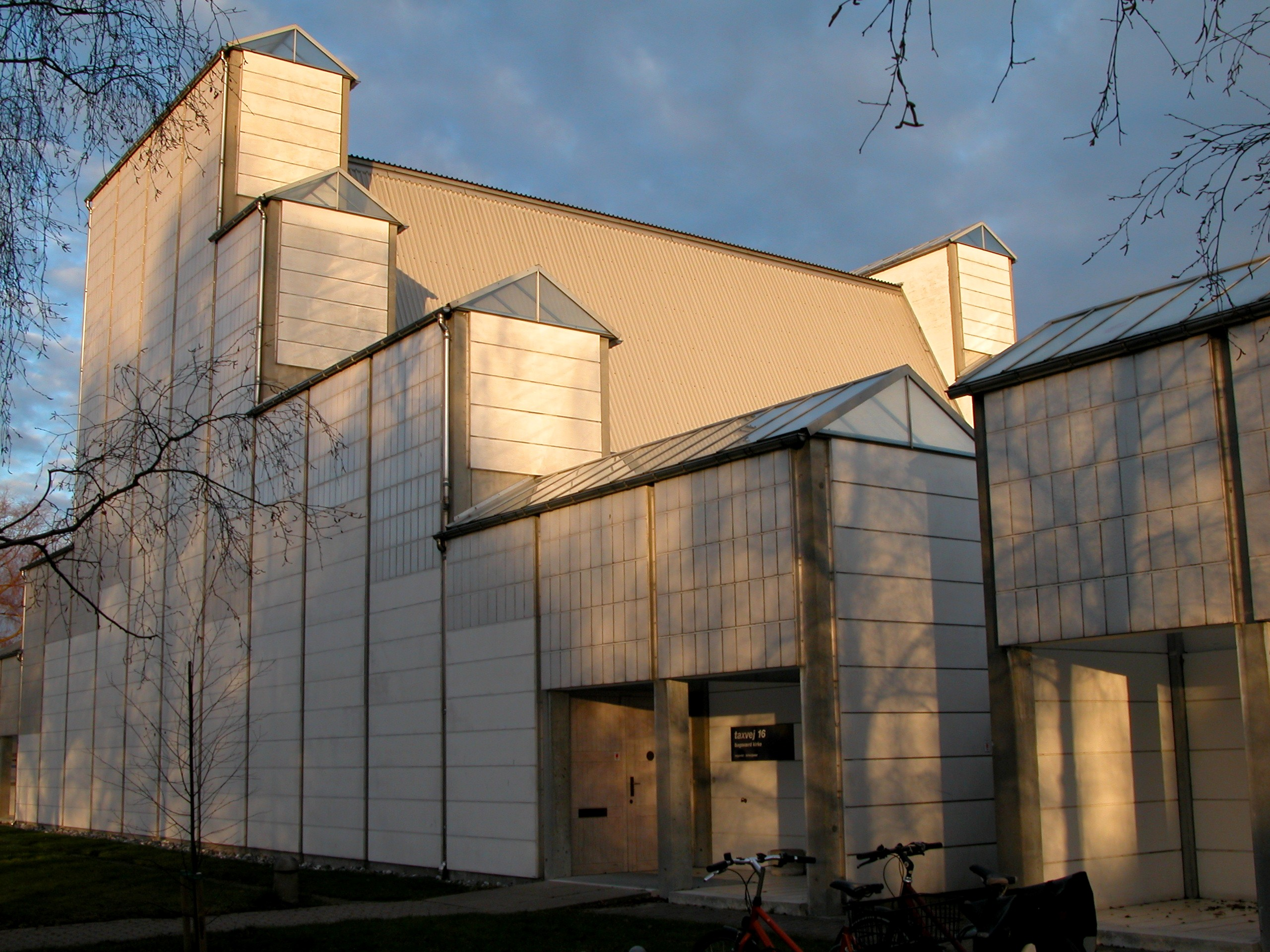
Austere outer walls

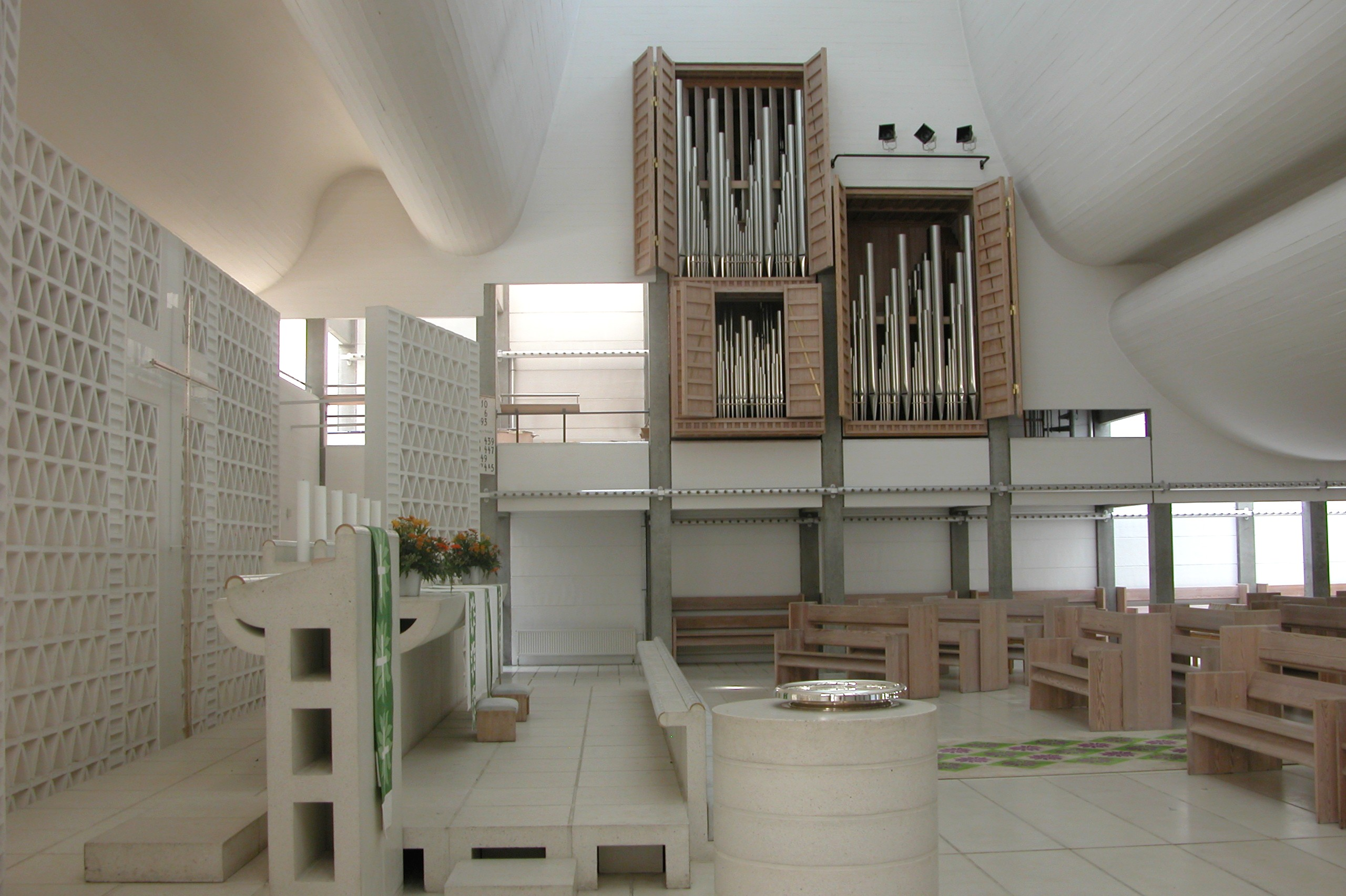
Church interior from ground level

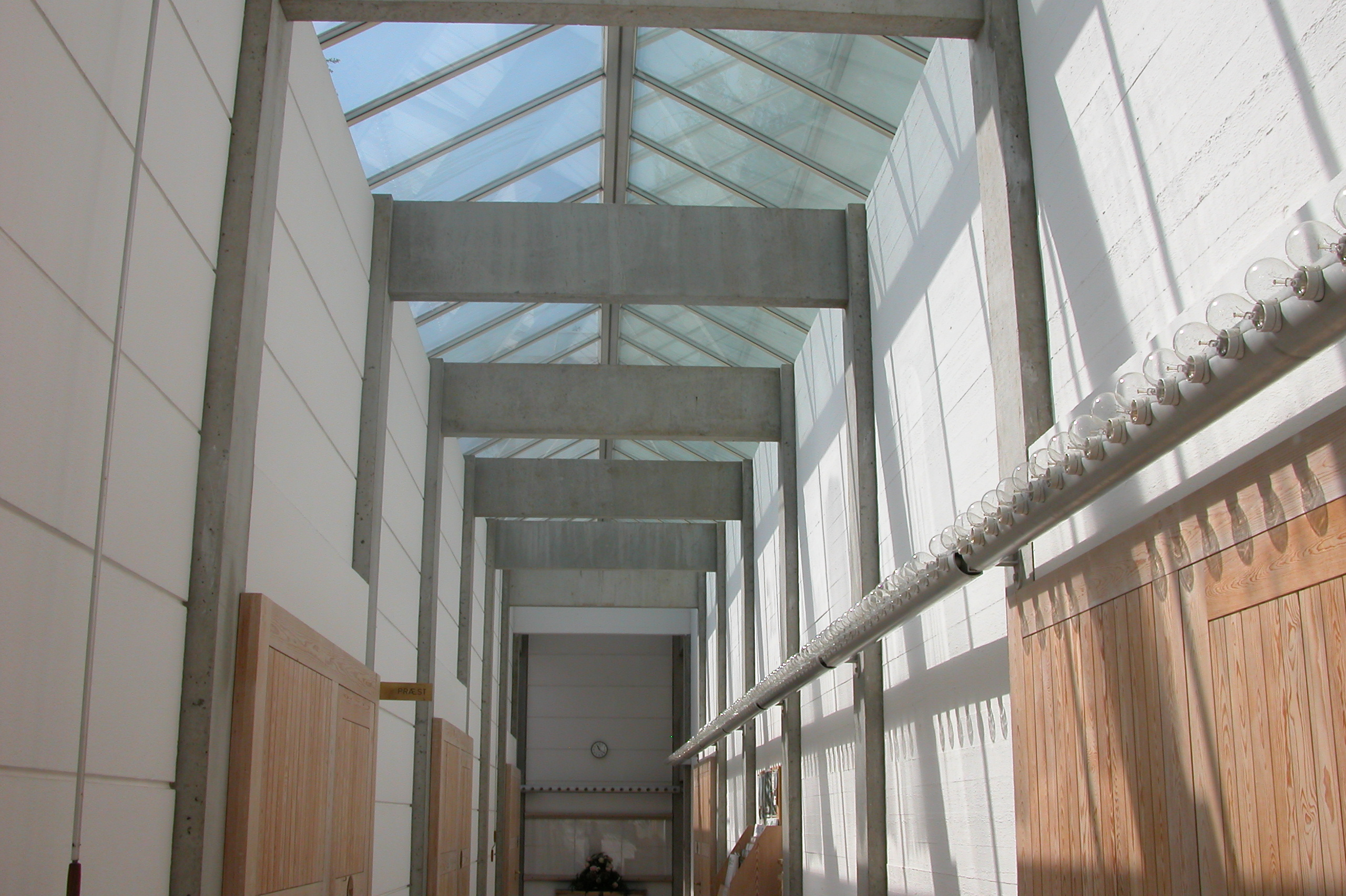
Corridor with skylights

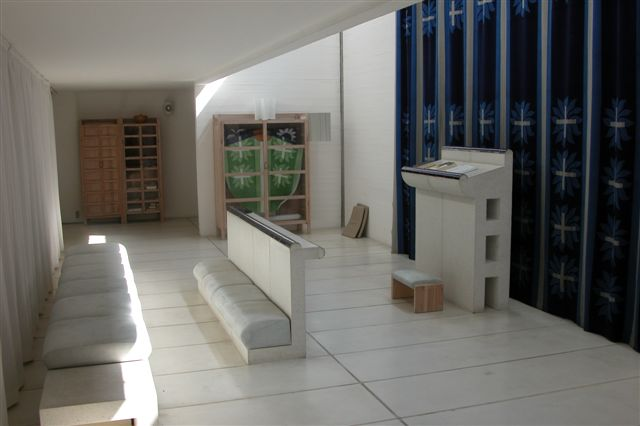
Sacristy

== See also ==
- Architecture of Denmark
