= Experimental School of Thessaloniki =

Coordinates: 40.6365°N 22.9484°E

The Experimental School of Thessaloniki also known as Experimental School of Aristotle University of Thessaloniki, is a public experimental school in Thessaloniki, Greece.

== History ==
=== Foundation ===
It was founded in 1929 in close ties with the Aristotle University of Thessaloniki. The building of the school was designed by the architect Dimitris Pikionis. It was established in 1934. Alexandros Delmouzos served as its first supervisor, and Vasilios Tatakis, a well known scientist, was the first Head of School. The school started functioning in a turbid political atmosphere and the beginning was difficult. The presence of Delmouzos to the school brought the principles of educational demoticism. This explains why they selected staff that had premium qualifications and supported the demotic language. Αs a working method Delmouzos suggested to his colleagues the method of school work of Dewey. The Decroly methods also became very popular to the first classes of the primary school.

=== Difficult Times ===
During the World War II, the school stopped operating while in the years of the Nazi occupation of Greece, it ran under very difficult circumstances. On the 20th of September 1941 Ioannis Xirotiris took office as school director of the PSPTH and remains the longest serving director of this school (1941–1962). During the difficult years of the Nazi Occupation and the Greek Civil War that followed, Xirotiris protected many faculty members from prosecution.

During the Papadopoulos dictatorship, the direction of the school was assumed by Triantaphyllos Papatheodoridis. He was unfamiliar and indifferent to the ideas and values that the school represented, therefore his ideology and attitude suited the zeitgeist of his era. He took over in 1967 and in the three years that he remained in office, he tried to eradicate the traditions of the school.

During the same period, some school graduates were accused by the military Junta and prosecuted to the court martial. Some of them, when they were summoned to testify in their defense, mentioned the Experimental School, showing how proud they were for their education there.

== Notable teachers ==
=== Supervisors ===
- Delmouzos Alexandros (1934–1938)
- Theodorakopoulos Ioannis (temporary 1935)
- Vogiazidis Ioannis (1938–1946)
- Vourveris Konstantinos (1946–1947)
- Gieros Xaralampos (1948–1958)
- Tatakis Vasileios (1958–1963, 1964–1965)
- Mpakalakis Georgios (1964)
- Mixailidis Nouaros Andreas (1965 - )

=== Head Teachers ===
- Tatakis Vasileios (1934–1938)
- Plagiannakos Ioannis (1938–1940)
- Xiritiris Ioannis (1941–1962)
- Karasotos Dimitrios (1963–1964)
- Mixalopoulos Georgios (1964–1966)
- Papatheodoridis Triantafullos (1968–1971)
- Kamaroudis Evaggelos (1971–1976)
- Xristoforidis Xristoforos (1976–1981)
- Drizis Aristotelis (1981–1982)
- Seferiadou Anthoula (1982 - )

=== Temporary Head Teachers ===
- Kalogeras Vasileios (1962–1963)
- Papaioannou Miltiadis (1964)
- Mixalopoulos Georgios (1966–1967)
- Griogoriadis Eleutherios (1967)
- Pauleas Sarantos (1967)
- Ampatzidis Ioannis (1971)
