= Yannis Xirotiris =

Greek educator and writer

Yannis Xirotiris (Greek: Ιωάννης Ξηροτύρης, transcr. Ioannis Xirotyris; 1900 – 23 February 2004) was a Greek educator and writer. He completed his studies in Germany and worked as a teacher in several schools throughout Greece, until 1941. He was also a prolific writer. He wrote his last book, 'Mnimes kai paratirisis" ("Memories and observances") at the age of 95. He died in Salonica, at the age of 104.

Between 1941 and 1962 he was the School Principal of the Experimental School of Thessaloniki at the Aristotle University of Thessaloniki 1941 to 1962 he replaced Alexandros Delmouzos as overseer of the school.

== Selected publications ==
- Ξηροτύρης, Ι. Ν. (2003). Η κοινωνιολογική σκέψη και ο Πλάτων. (Sociological thought and Plato) Αθήνα
- Ξηροτύρης, Ι. Ν. (2001). Μνήμες και Παρατηρήσεις.(Memories and observances (or comments/remarks) Θεσσαλονίκη.
- Ξηροτύρης, Ι. Ν. (1978). Αλέξανδρος Δελμούζος.(Alexandros Delmouzos) Λόγος και Πράξη, 6, 7.
