= Archaeological Museum of Ioannina =

Coordinates: 39°40′0″N 20°51′22″E

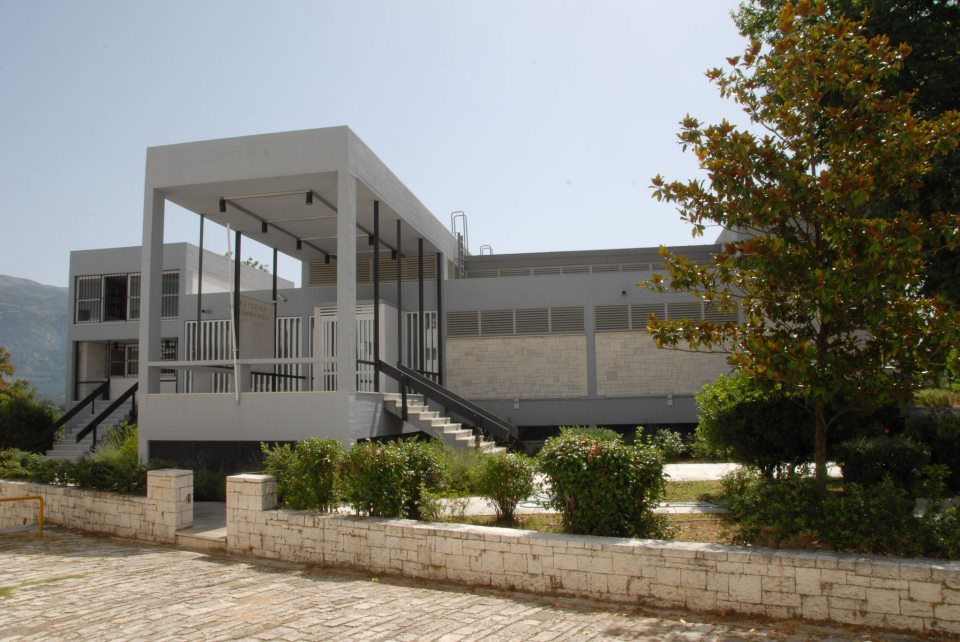
- Established: August 1, 1970
- Location: Ioannina, Greece
- Type: Archaeological museum
- Director: Kostantinos Soueref
- Website: http://www.amio.gr/

The Archaeological Museum of Ioannina is a museum located in Litharitsa Park in the centre of Ioannina, Greece.

The museum contains many artifacts unearthed in the surrounding area such as Palaeolithic tools, from Kokkinopilos, Asprochaliko and Kastritsa, the ruins of Dodoni and ancient cemeteries such as Vitsa and the Oracle of Acheron. The museum also has many inscriptions, headstones, and a collection of coins.

The building was designed by Greek architect Aris Konstantinidis (1913-1993).
