= Nørre Gymnasium =

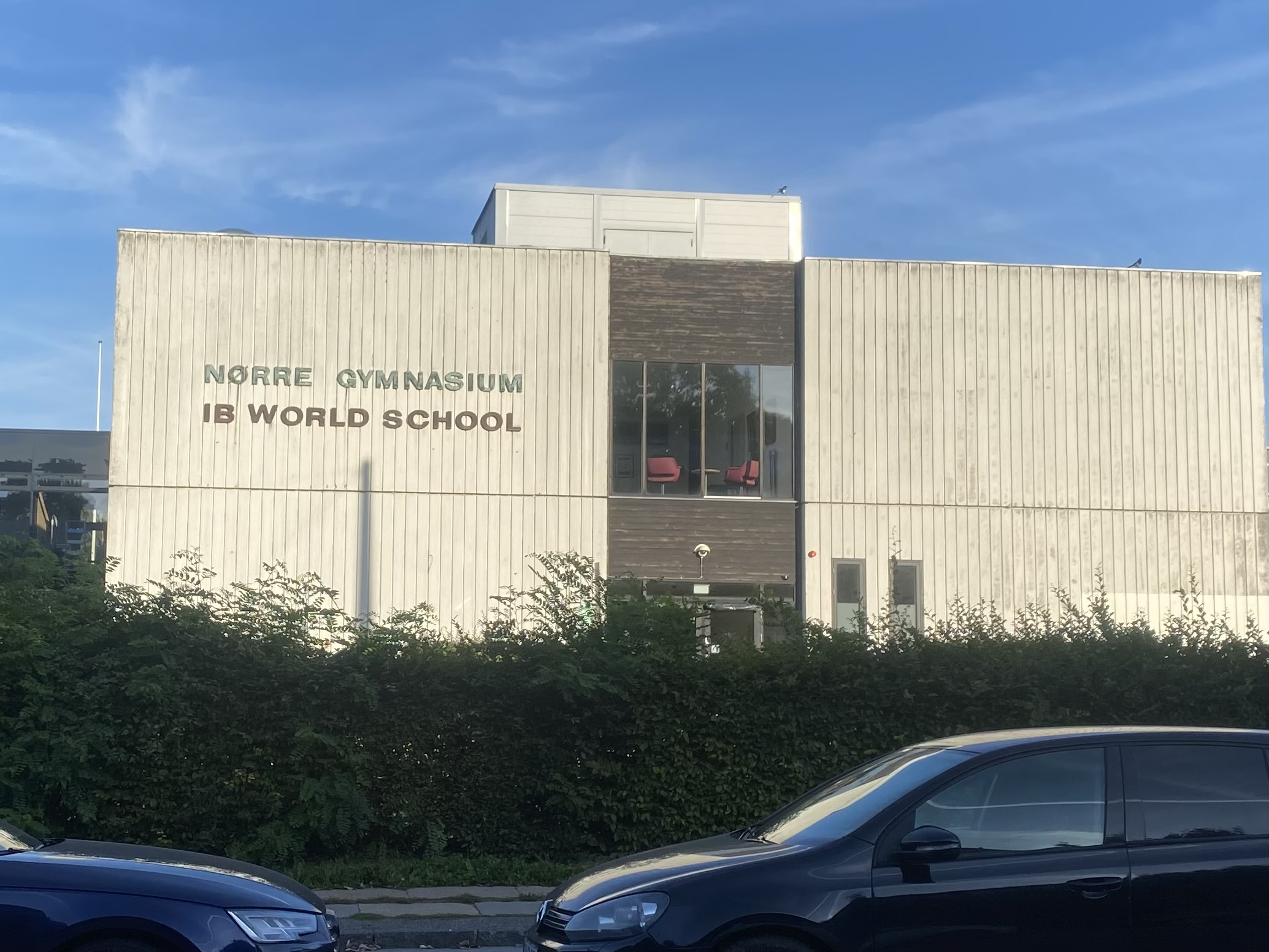
- Front view of the school building

Location
- Mørkhøjvej 78, 2700 Brønshoj; Husum; Copenhagen; Denmark
- Coordinates: 55.7182°N 12.4713°E

Information
- Founded: 1818
- School code: IB School code: 000598
- Principal: Mette Vedel
- Gender: Coeducational
- Enrollment: 1,212 students (September 2023)
- Classes offered: International Baccalaureate, High School
- Language: Danish, English
- Website: www.norreg.dk

Nørre Gymnasium is one of Copenhagen’s largest gymnasiums offering both Danish instruction as well as the International Baccalaureate curriculum. It was founded in 1818 by Caroline Wroblewsky as a school for young girls, and since 1972 it has been located in Husum, Denmark.

== Early school history ==
=== School's founding ===
In 1814 a law was passed in Denmark requiring a seven-year compulsory education for all citizens. As public schools alone could not meet the demand, the new law led to a huge increase in the number of private schools. There were 127 applications for school formation between 1815 and 1818.

In 1818, the year of her father's death, Marie Albertine Caroline Wroblewsky sent in an application for an “institution of general education for a limited amount of young girls.” She was rejected as there were already too many schools in the Trinitatis parish. In her second application she requested to form her school in the suburb of Nørrebro. The school commission queried the necessity for a girls’ school there, but the municipality's school directors approved Wroblewsky's application on November 7, 1818, the day she turned 26.

=== Under three managers ===
==== Caroline Wroblewsky ====
The exact location of the school in its first year is not known, only that it was on the Nørrebrogade. It is possible to locate the school on different land titles from 1823. In 1824 the school was expanded to include older girls and Lieutenant Larsen was hired to teach French. When Vilhelm August Borgen became Copenhagen's first school director in 1844, he standardized school levels and supplied information about the new requirements. In Wroblewsky's school there were 7 male and 2 female teachers with 40 students divided into two classes. The subjects taught were religion, Danish, German, French, history, geography, nature study, arithmetic, writing, drawing, singing and needlework. Physical education was introduced in 1848. Wroblewsky retired in 1858 after 40 years at the school. She died on 1875, at age 82.

==== Caroline Wroblewsky's stepdaughter ====
Caroline Wroblewsky's stepdaughter Emilie Christine Løbner took over the management of the school, herself a former student and teacher at the school. On September 11, 1858, Løbner took an exam to become a 3rd-degree institution manager, giving her the right to expand the school and teach girls up to the age of 16. In 1873 there were a total of 15 teachers at the school. In 1892, after 34 years of service, Løbner retired.

==== Karen Kjær ====
Karen Kjær, educated as both a school manager and a teacher, became head of the school in 1892. She moved the school to Fælledvej street, splitting the students into single-year classes. The student population grew to 324 in 1904 (from 66 in 1882) reaching a total of 480 in 1918, the school's centennial year. Because of the continued increase in the student body, Karen Kjær moved the school to an independent building in the Gartnergade neighborhood in 1897.

In Gartnergade, the school continued to expand. In 1904 room was created for the new subjects, physics and chemistry. When modern foreign language courses were introduced in Denmark in 1909 (as opposed to classical), the school's management decided to create a high school, completed in 1913. The science-mathematical course was an option at the school from 1915. Although overcrowded, the school stayed at the same location until 1971.

== The 20th century ==
=== Nørre Gymnasium through 1940 ===
In 1919 the school changed its name to Nørre Gymnasium and, for financial reasons, was split into two parts. One part became a public high school with Karen Kjær as principal and the other a private preparatory school with Dorothea Krag as manager. Both schools were housed in the same building until 1924, when the prep school moved to Thorvaldsen's Girls’ School.

By the time Karen Kjær died, Nørre had developed into a high school (including a secondary school) from its humble beginnings as a school for young girls. It had also been led by only three women in its 105-year history.

Knud Theodor Thejll, former head of K. Thejll's Higher Girls’ School, became principal in 1923 and continued leading in Kjær's style. Thejll was concerned about the lack of space and other problems with the school's layout and sought a solution in 1932. It was also during Thejll's tenure that Nørre high school students started going on seven-day study trips, usually within Denmark, sometimes going into Sweden. The first trip to Berlin took place in 1970.

Thejll left the post in 1940 and died a year later.

=== Problems at the school ===
Ingeborg Hasselriis was the school's principal from 1940 to 1960. During the Occupation of Denmark by Nazi Germany, the school came under threat of being converted into a hospital for Nazi troops. The lack of space continued to be a problem in 1940. In one case, a closet was being used as classroom: Dark, and with the corridor-facing wall made of glass, the space was only 5.30 by 3.85 meters (17.4 ft × 12.6 ft) and was shared by 9 students. The school was also aging; the physics and chemistry labs were at low standards, and there was no large assembly hall or bicycle storage area. Boys were not yet admitted as they were in many other public schools. Thus, under Hasselriis, Nørre Gymnasium lost its popularity and began to lose students. (The school finally turned co-ed at the end of the 1950s.)

Ingeborg Hasselriis left the school in 1960 and was succeeded by Jørgen Andersen. Under his direction a student council was established in 1965, which called for a partial smoking permission and allowed students to stay in classrooms during breaks. In 1968 Nørre celebrated its 150th anniversary, and it was confirmed that a new school would be built in Mørkhøjvej.

=== The new school in Mørkhøjvej ===
The building for the new school opened officially on March 23, 1972, and classes in the new facility commenced on August 9 for the new school year.

In 1991 the IB programme, the international educational curriculum, became available at the school. Nørre Gymnasium is only one of ten IB-accredited schools in Denmark.

== List of the school's principals ==
| Years | Principal | Years served |
|---|---|---|
| 1818–1858 | Caroline Wroblewsky | 40 years |
| 1858–1892 | Emilie Løbner | 34 years |
| 1892–1923 | Karen Kjær | 41 years |
| 1923–1940 | Knud Theodor Thejll | 27 years |
| 1940–1960 | Ingeborg Hasselriis | 20 years |
| 1960–1971 | Jørgen Andersen | 11 years |
| 1971 | Povl Aagaard (acting principal) | 1 year |
| 1971–1989 | Per Cortes | 18 years |
| 1989–1991 | Kirsten Jeppesen (acting principal) | 2 years |
| 1991–2001 | Ib Fischer Hansen | 10 years |
| 2001–2020 | Jens Boe Nielsen | 19 years |
| 2020– | Mette Vedel | |
