= Greek National Tourism Organization =

Greek government agency

Greek National Tourism Organisation
- Εθνικός Οργανισμός Τουρισμού (EOT)

Agency overview
- Formed: 1929, re-established in 1950
- Jurisdiction: Ministry of Tourism
- Headquarters: 7 Tsoha Street 11521 Athens Greece; 37.984694°N 23.758218°E
- Agency executive: Angela Varela, President
- Website: gnto.gov.gr

The Greek National Tourism Organisation (Greek: Εθνικός Οργανισμός Τουρισμού, Ethnikos Organismos Tourismou), often abbreviated as GNTO (Greek: EOT) is the governmental Board for the promotion of tourism in Greece. It functions under the supervision of the Ministry of Tourism.

== History ==
The Greek National Tourism Organisation (GNTO), that was founded in 1929 and was re-established in 1950, is a Public Entity (PE) under the supervision of the Ministry of Tourism. Its main mission nowadays is to develop and promote the Greek tourism product through the implementation of promotional tourism campaigns both in Greece and abroad utilizing as well its extensive network of overseas offices. Moreover, with its vast experience, expertise, its large network of associates and stakeholders both in Greece and abroad, the GNTO has been and continues to be fundamental in the national effort of promoting "Greece", this truly unique and amazing destination, both cost-effectively and efficiently. It is member of the United Nations World Tourism Organization (UN Tourism) and the European Travel Commission (ETC).

== Promotion work ==
Seaside in Greece poster, part of the "seaside in Greece" campaign of 2010.

Tourist Accommodation operating licence sign issued by the Greek National Tourism Organisation (GNTO)

Over the years, various successful advertising campaigns have been funded by the organization, including the very successful "Live your myth in Greece" campaign. The 2010 campaign's motto was "You in Greece" and "xx in Greece", and mainly focused on the many opportunities the country provides for tourists, with a variety of different destinations and activities. "You in Athens" and "You in Thessaloniki" were also used to promote the country's two largest cities and centers of culture and entertainment. The 2010 advertising campaign published a variety of promotional TV spots in line with the "You in Greece" poster campaign, which were translated to various languages, including Chinese, Bulgarian, and German.

Previous campaign slogans include:

- "Greece - Your Best Time Yet" (2004)
- "Live your Myth in Greece" (2005-2006)
- "Live your Myth in Greece - Starring You" (2006)
- "Greece - Explore your senses" (2007)
- "My Greek experience", "Greece - the true experience" (2008; TV commercials using amateur videos)
- "Greece 5000 years old: a masterpiece you can afford" (2009)
- "Greece: Kalimera!" (2009)
- "You in Greece" (2010, 2011, 2012, 2013)
- "Greece - All Time Classic" (2014)
- "Greece - A 365 Day Destination" (2017)
- "Greece - Always in Season" (2020)
- "All you want is Greece" (2021)
- "Greece - You Will Want to Stay Forever" (2022)
- "Greece - A Life-Changing Experience" (2023)
- "Greece Like Never Before" (2026)

=== Offices abroad ===
Currently the GNTO operates offices in the following countries:

- Australia: Melbourne
- Austria: Vienna
- China: Beijing
- Cyprus: Nicosia
- France: Paris
- Germany: Frankfurt
- Israel: Tel Aviv
- Italy: Milan
- Netherlands: Amsterdam
- Poland: Warsaw
- Romania: Bucharest
- Russia: Russia
- Serbia: Belgrade
- Sweden: Stockholm
- Turkey: Istanbul
- United Kingdom: London (also serves Ireland)
- United States: New York City

== See also ==
- Tourism in Greece
- Xenia (hotel)
- Greek Tourism Confederation
