= Critical regionalism =

Approach to architecture

Critical regionalism is an approach to architecture that strives to counter the placelessness and lack of identity of the International Style, but also rejects the whimsical individualism and ornamentation of Postmodern architecture. The approach of critical regionalism seek to provide an architecture rooted in the modern tradition, but tied to geographical and cultural context. Critical regionalism is not simply regionalism in the sense of vernacular architecture. It is a progressive approach to design that seeks to mediate between the global and the local languages of architecture.

The phrase "critical regionalism" was first presented in 1981, in ‘The Grid and the Pathway,’ an essay published in Architecture in Greece, by the architectural theorists Alexander Tzonis and Liane Lefaivre and, with a slightly different meaning, by the historian-theorist Kenneth Frampton. Sri Lankan Architect Minnette De Silva was one of the pioneers in practicing this architecture style in the 1950s and termed it 'Regional Modernism'.

Critical Regionalists thus hold that both modern and post-modern architecture are "deeply problematic".

== Kenneth Frampton ==
In "Towards a Critical Regionalism: Six points for an architecture of resistance", Frampton recalls Paul Ricoeur's "how to become modern and to return to sources; how to revive an old, dormant civilization and take part in universal civilization". According to Frampton's proposal, critical regionalism should adopt modern architecture, critically, for its universal progressive qualities but at the same time value should be placed on the geographical context of the building. Emphasis, Frampton says, should be on topography, climate, light; on tectonic form rather than on scenography (i.e. painting theatrical scenery) and should be on the sense of touch rather than visual sense. Frampton draws on phenomenology for his argument.

Two examples Frampton briefly discusses are Jørn Utzon and Alvar Aalto. In Frampton's view, Utzon's Bagsværd Church (1973–6), near Copenhagen is a self-conscious synthesis between universal civilization and world culture. This is revealed by the rational, modular, neutral and economic, partly prefabricated concrete outer shell (i.e. universal civilization) versus the specially designed, 'uneconomic', organic, reinforced concrete shell of the interior, signifying with its manipulation of light sacred space and 'multiple cross-cultural references', which Frampton sees no precedent for in Western culture, but rather in the Chinese pagoda roof (i.e. world culture). In the case of Aalto, Frampton discusses the red brick Säynätsalo Town Hall (1952), where, he argues, there is a resistance to universal technology and vision, affected by using the tactile qualities of the building's materials. He notes, for instance, feeling the contrast between the friction of the brick surface of the stairs and the springy wooden floor of the council chamber.

In addition to his own writings on the topic, Frampton has furthered the intellectual reach of these ideas through contributions, in the form of introductions, prefaces and forewords, written for publications on architects and architectural practices that conform with the ethics of critical regionalism.

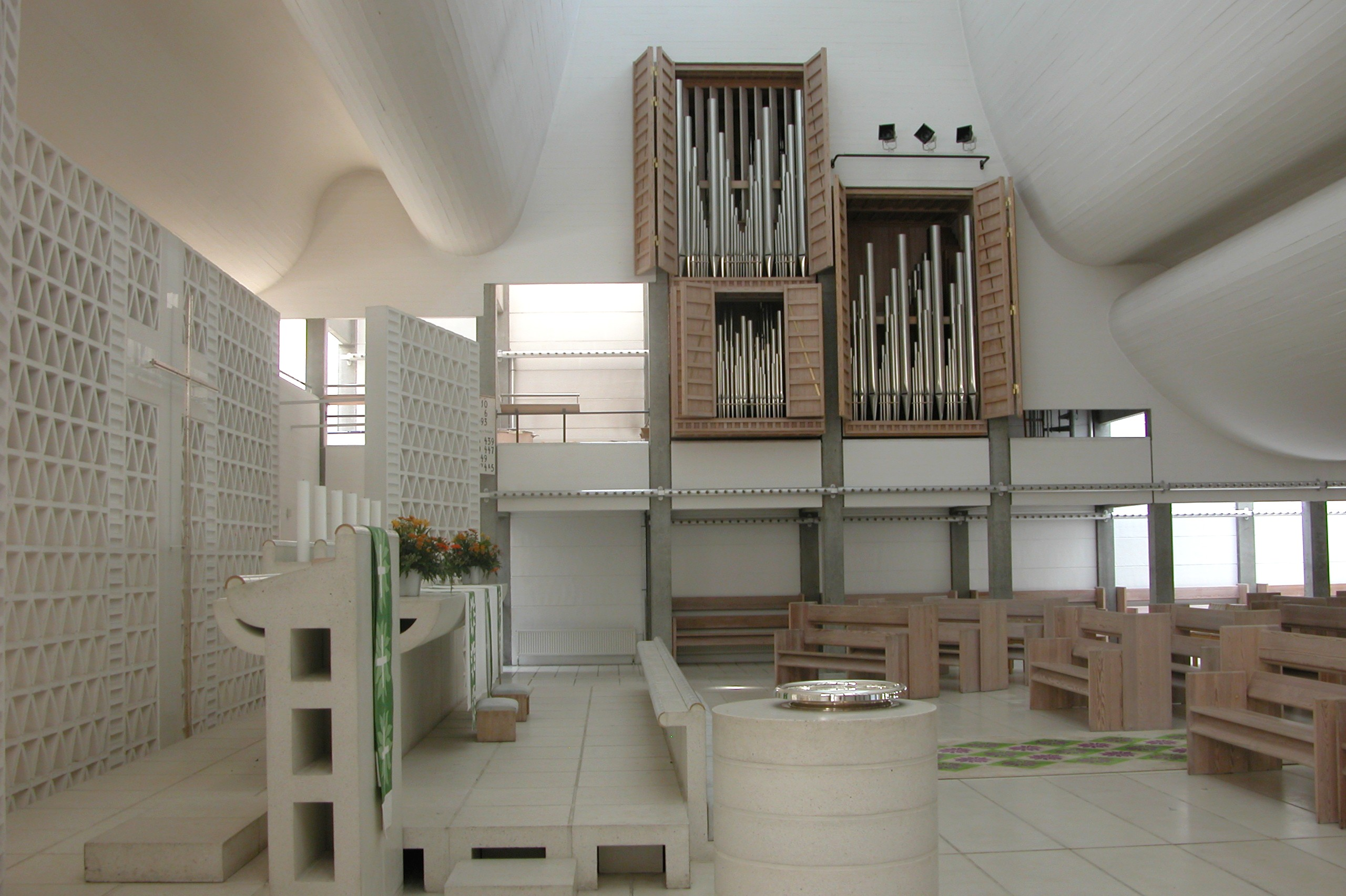
Bagsværd Church, Denmark, designed by Jørn Utzon in 1968

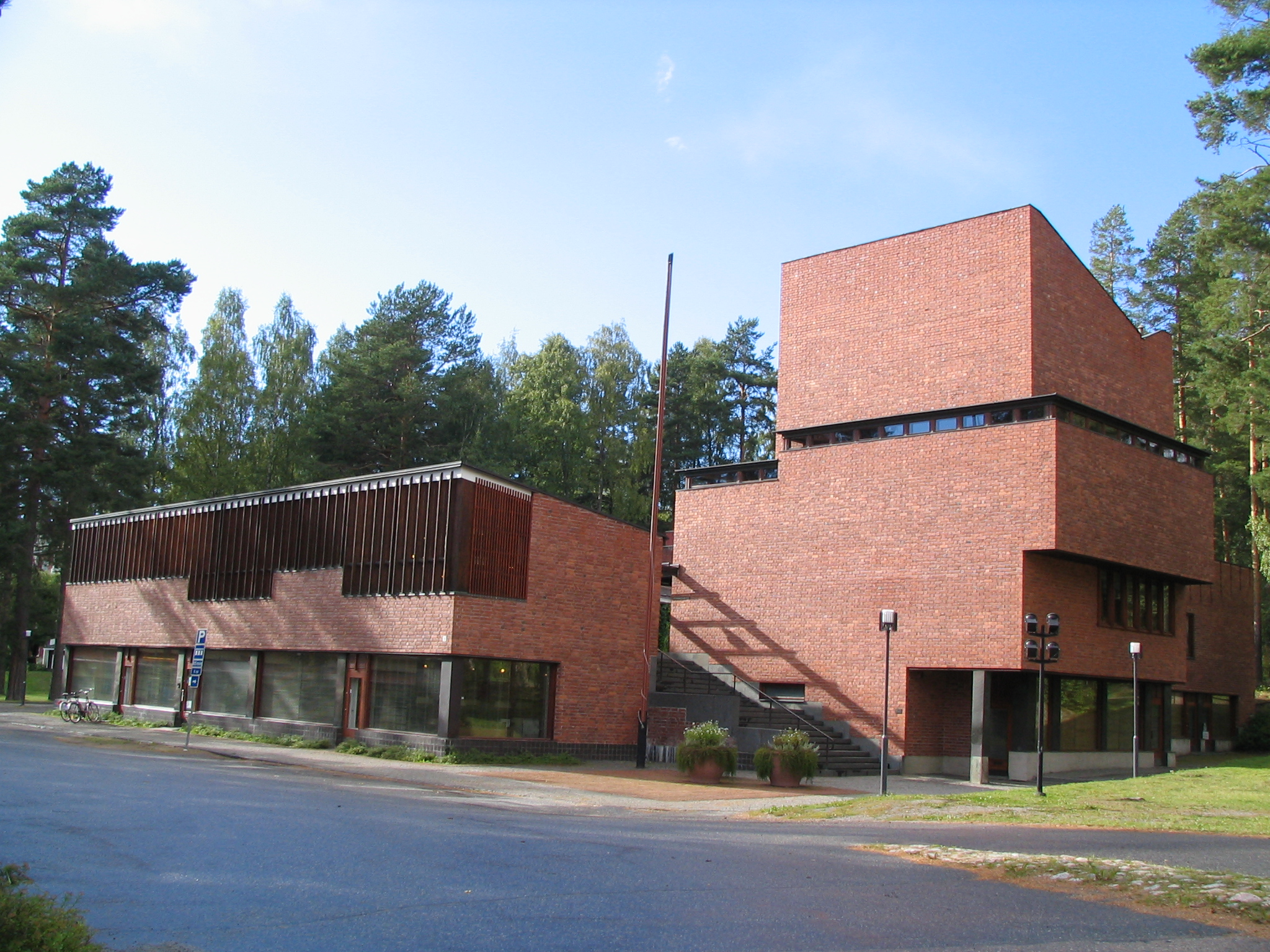
Säynätsalo Town Hall (1952), Finland

== William J. R. Curtis and Suha Ozkan ==
There have been two different perceptions of Regionalism in architecture. One of which is of Western writers, like Curtis, whose definitions are not encompassing enough to analyse architectural styles especially in the last two centuries in the Islamic countries, like Iran. However, Ozkan's definition of Regionalism is more objective.

== Alexander Tzonis and Liane Lefaivre ==
According to Alexander Tzonis and Liane Lefaivre, critical regionalism need not directly draw from the context; rather elements can be stripped of context but used in unfamiliar ways. Here the aim is to make evident a disruption and loss of place, that is already a fait accompli, through reflection and self-evaluation.

== Critical regionalist architects ==
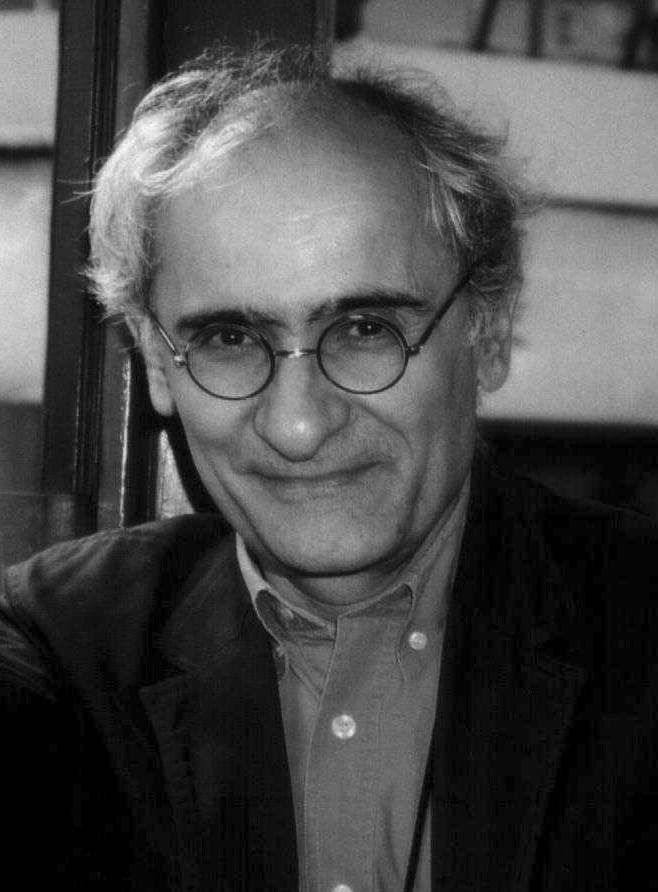
Alexander Tzonis

In addition to Aalto and Utzon, the following architects have used Critical Regionalism (in the Frampton sense) in their work: Álvaro Siza Vieira, Studio Granda, Mario Botta, Eduardo Souto de Moura, Mahesh Naik, Sahil Ahmed, Mazharul Islam, B. V. Doshi, Max Strang, Charles Correa, Christopher Benninger, Jorge Ferreira Chaves, Rafael Moneo, Geoffrey Bawa, Raj Rewal, Dharmesh Vadavala, Ashok "Bihari" Lall Neelkanth Chhaya (Kaka), P.K.Das, Soumitro Ghosh, Nisha Mathew Ghosh, Ngô Viết Thụ, Tadao Ando, Mack Scogin / Merrill Elam, Glenn Murcutt, Johnsen Schmaling Architects, Ken Yeang, Philippe Madec, William S.W. Lim, Tay Kheng Soon, WOHA Architects (Singapore), Juhani Pallasmaa, Wang Shu, Juha Leiviskä, Peter Zumthor, Carlo Scarpa, Miller | Hull, Tan Hock Beng. Peter Stutchbury, Lake Flato, Rick Joy, Tom Kundig, and Sverre Fehn. Suzana & Dimitris Antonakakis are the two Greek architects for whom the term was first used by Alexander Tzonis and Liane Lefaivre.

Critical regionalism has developed into unique sub-styles across the world. Glenn Murcutt's simple vernacular architectural style is representative of an Australian variant to critical regionalism. In Singapore, WOHA has developed a unique architectural vocabulary based on an appreciation of the local climate and culture.

== Criticism ==
Although supportive of critical regionalism's attempt to adapt design to local climate, site conditions, and locally available materials, considering it an improvement in relation to the International Style of Modernism, architecture theorist Nikos Salingaros criticizes its anti-regional and anti-traditional tendencies derived from Critical Theory. Nikos Salingaros states that "In practice, critical regionalism willfully perpetuates the form languages of Modernism. Our understanding, however, is that regionalism has to protect and re-use traditional form languages. True regionalism has to free itself from any global form language imposed from above, and from any forces of uniformization and conformity."

== In cultural studies ==
Subsequently, the phrase "critical regionalism" has also been used in cultural studies, literary studies, and political theory, specifically in the work of Gayatri Chakravorty Spivak. In her 2007 work "Who Sings the Nation-State?", co-authored with Judith Butler, Spivak proposes a deconstructive alternative to nationalism that is predicated on the deconstruction of borders and rigid national identity. Douglas Reichert Powell's book Critical Regionalism: Connecting Politics and Culture in the American Landscape (2007) traces the trajectory of the term critical regionalism from its original use in architectural theory to its inclusion in literary, cultural, and political studies and proposes a methodology based on the intersection of those fields.

== See also ==
- Contextual architecture
- Critical theory
- Neo-Historicism
