= Xenia (hotel) =

- Ξενία,
- The logotype of Xenia

General information
- Status: Listed building
- Type: Hotel
- Architectural style: Post-war Modern architecture
- Location: Greece, Greece
- Construction started: 1951
- Closed: 1974
- Demolished: Early 2000s for most of the units
- Owner: Public, Greek National Tourism Organization, State of Greece

Website
- gnto.gov.gr

Xenia (Ξενία) was a nationwide hotel construction program initiated by the Hellenic Tourism Organisation (Ελληνικός Οργανισμός Τουρισμού, E.O.T.) to improve the country's tourism infrastructure in the 1960s and 1970s. It constitutes one of the largest infrastructure projects in modern Greek history.

== History ==
Until the 1950s, Greece featured only a few major hotels, mostly situated in the country's great cities, and a few smaller ones in islands like Corfu or Rhodes. In 1950, EOT began a program to construct and operate hotels across the country, especially in the less-travelled areas. Locations were specially selected and the architecture combined local knowledge with standardized elements. The buildings were embedded in the landscape, but at the same time followed a modernist style.

The first manager of the project was the architect Charalambos Sfaellos (from 1950 to 1958) and from 1957 the buildings were designed by a team under Aris Konstantinidis. Many private hotel projects in Greece were inspired by the Xenia hotels and the program had reached its aims in the early 1970s. In 1974 the construction program was complete. The Xenia program itself was officially terminated in 1983, and the hotels were given over to private operators or eventually sold off.

Some hotels are still operated privately under the Xenia name. Many of the program's hotels have been designated as historic monuments for their architectural value. Three have been demolished, while other surviving examples have been substantially altered or are in a dilapidated state.

Α special category of hotel units was created under the name "Xenia Helios" for school of tourism operate in Anavyssos in Attica, Parnitha in Attica housed in the former Parnitha Sanatorium, Peraia in Thessaloniki, Kokkini Hani in Heraklion. Xenia Helios they were both hotels and school of tourism, as model tourist units in which students of the country's tourist schools were training with a combination of theoretical training and practical training in real time hotel operating conditions. "Xenia Helios" in Peraia, Thessaloniki launched in 1978 exclusively for housing the School of Tourism Professions of Thessaloniki, where in the summer it operated as a 3 stars, with a capacity of 77 rooms and the rest of the year as a model training school, where students stayed in the rooms as boarders.

In 2025, as part of the general effort to upgrade state tourism education, the Ministry of Tourism is proceeding with the utilization of historic Xenia Helios hotels for their long-term lease. The private individuals who prevail in the tenders will undertake the obligation to renovate the hotels to operate them as hotels and for employing students from state schools of tourism education of the Ministry of Tourism that will be located relatively close to it.

== Xenia hotels ==
This section lists the tourist establishments according to the administrative region to which they belong:

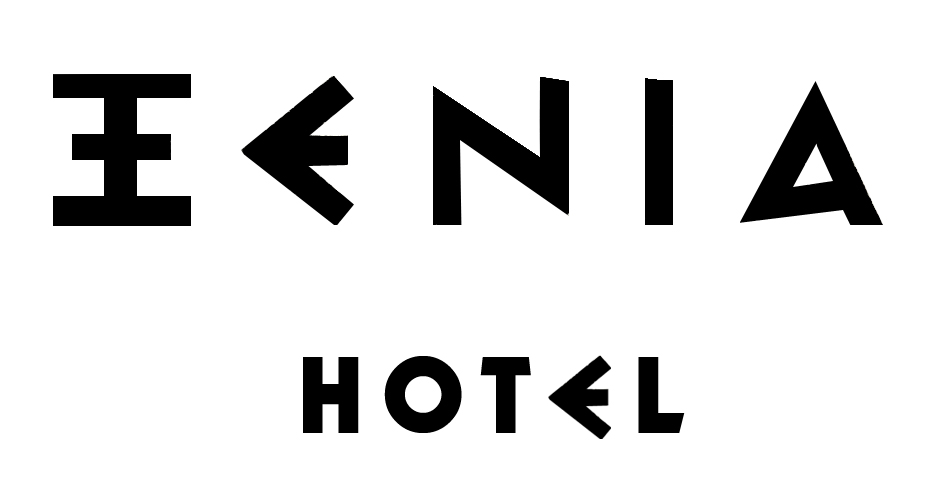
First logo of the chain Xenia Hotels

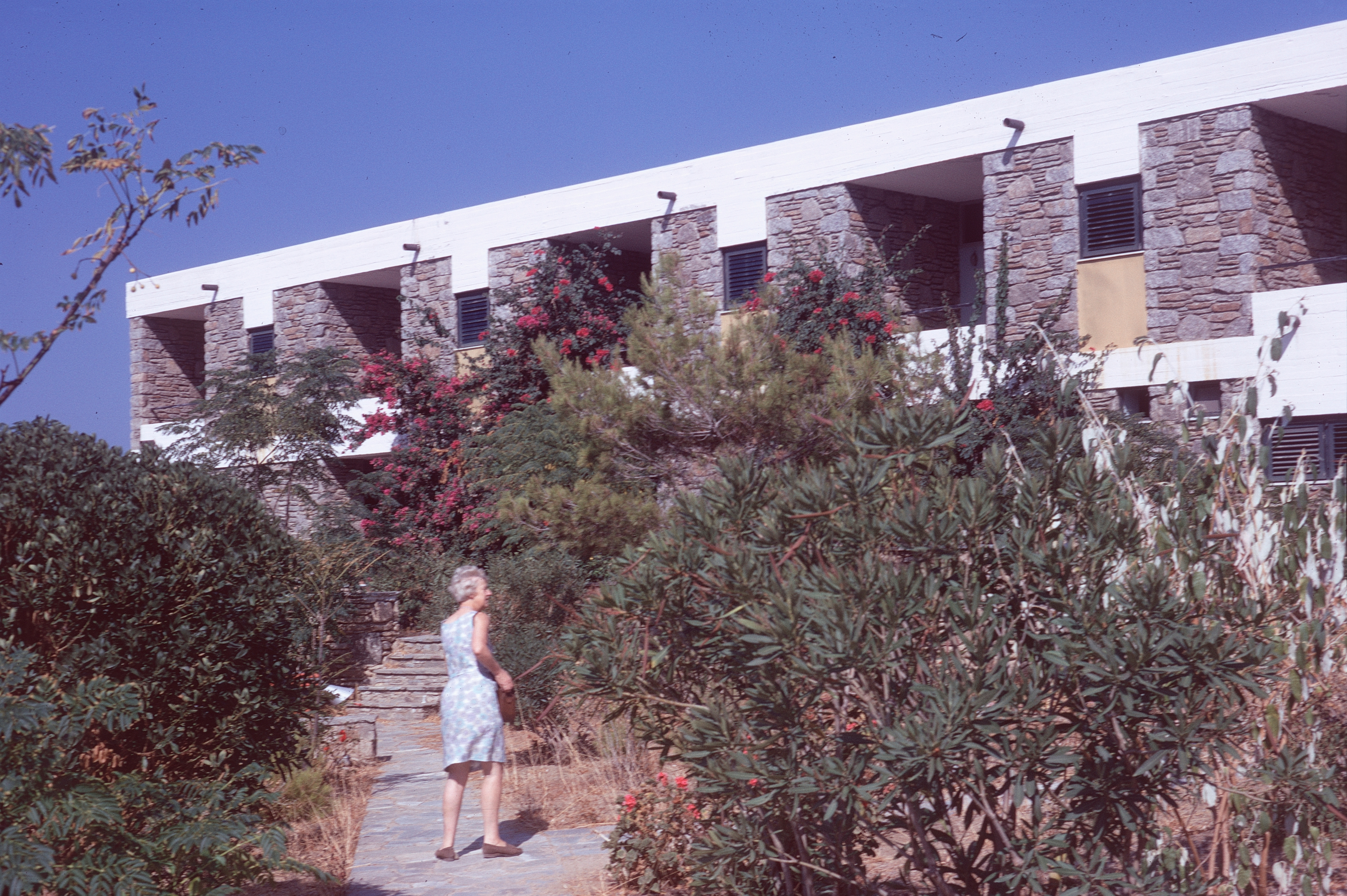
Xenia Mykonos (1970), Mykonos

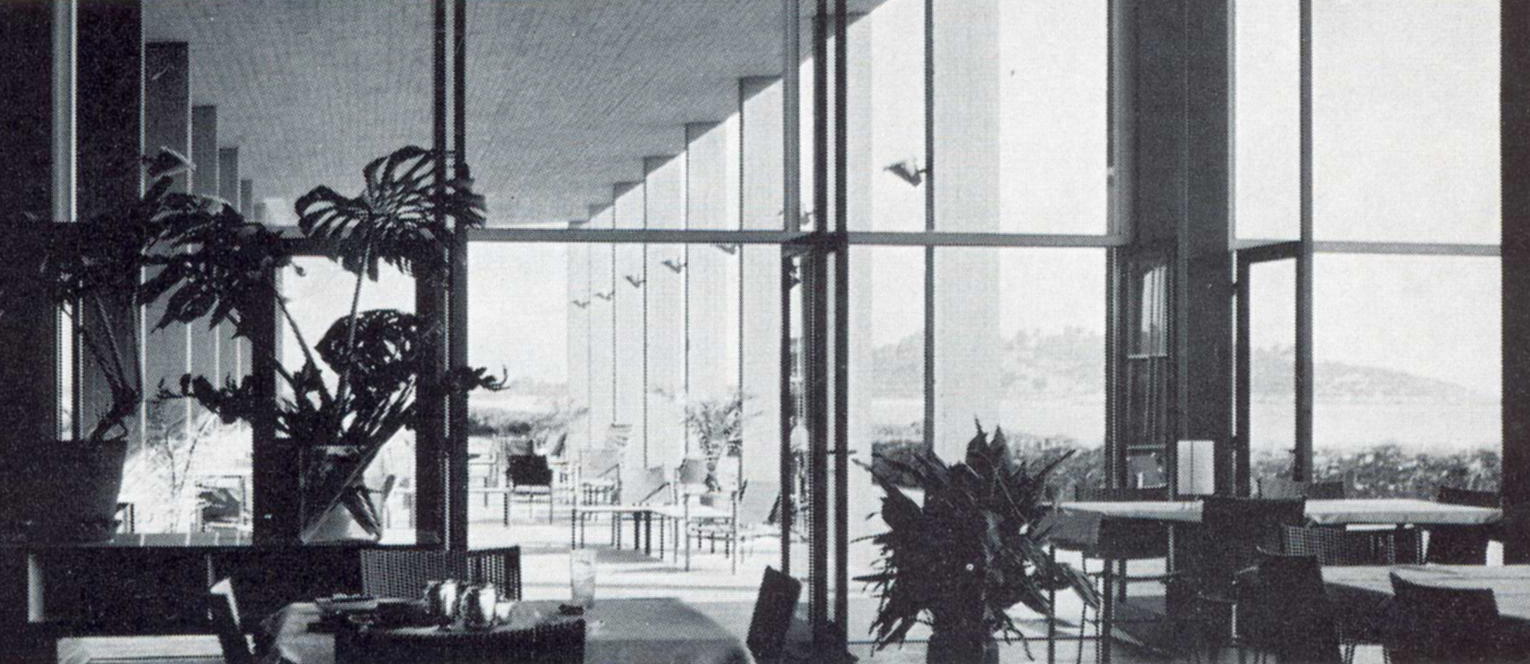
Xenia Paliouri (1962), Paliouri

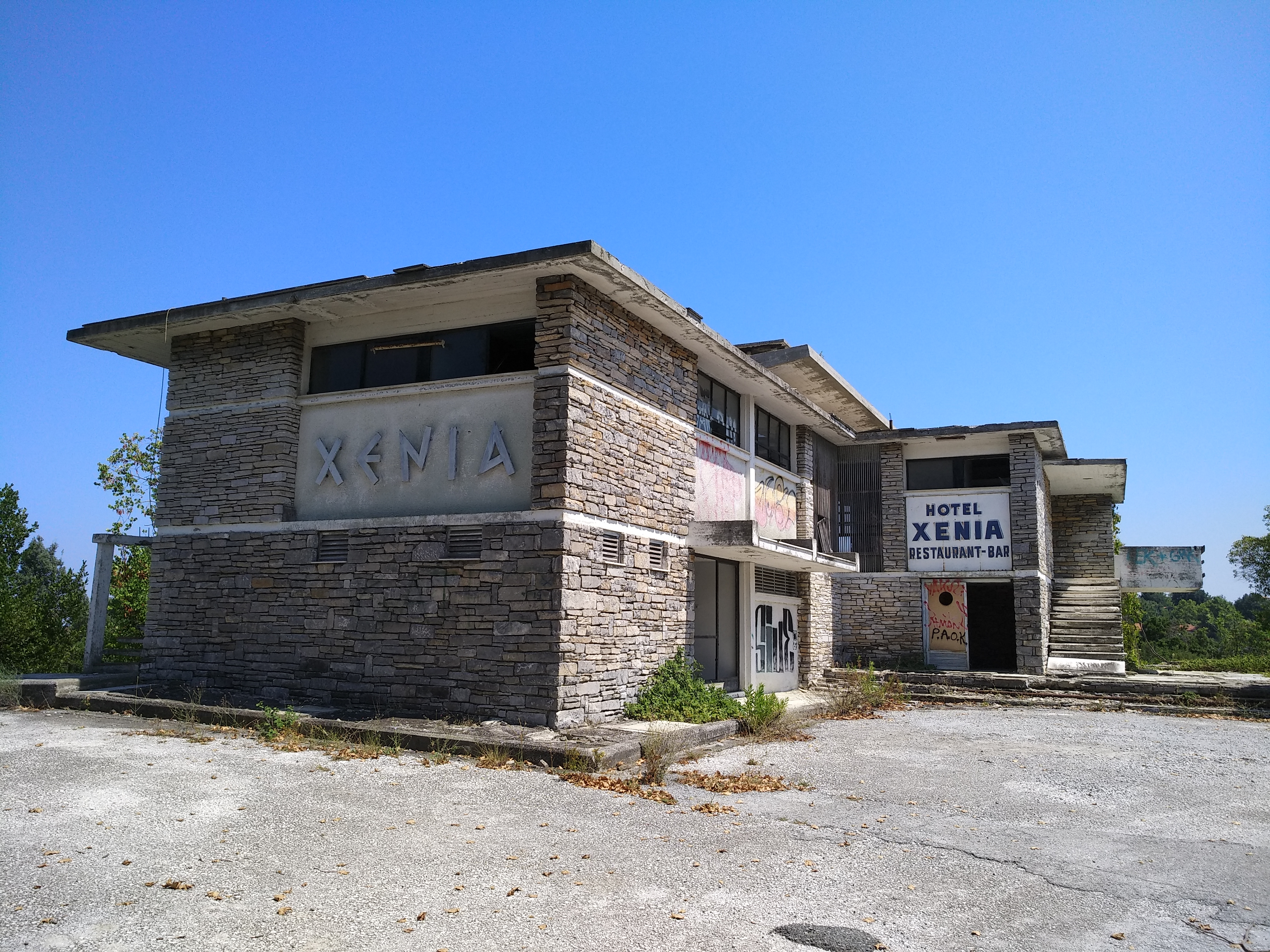
Xenia Platamon (2018), Platamon

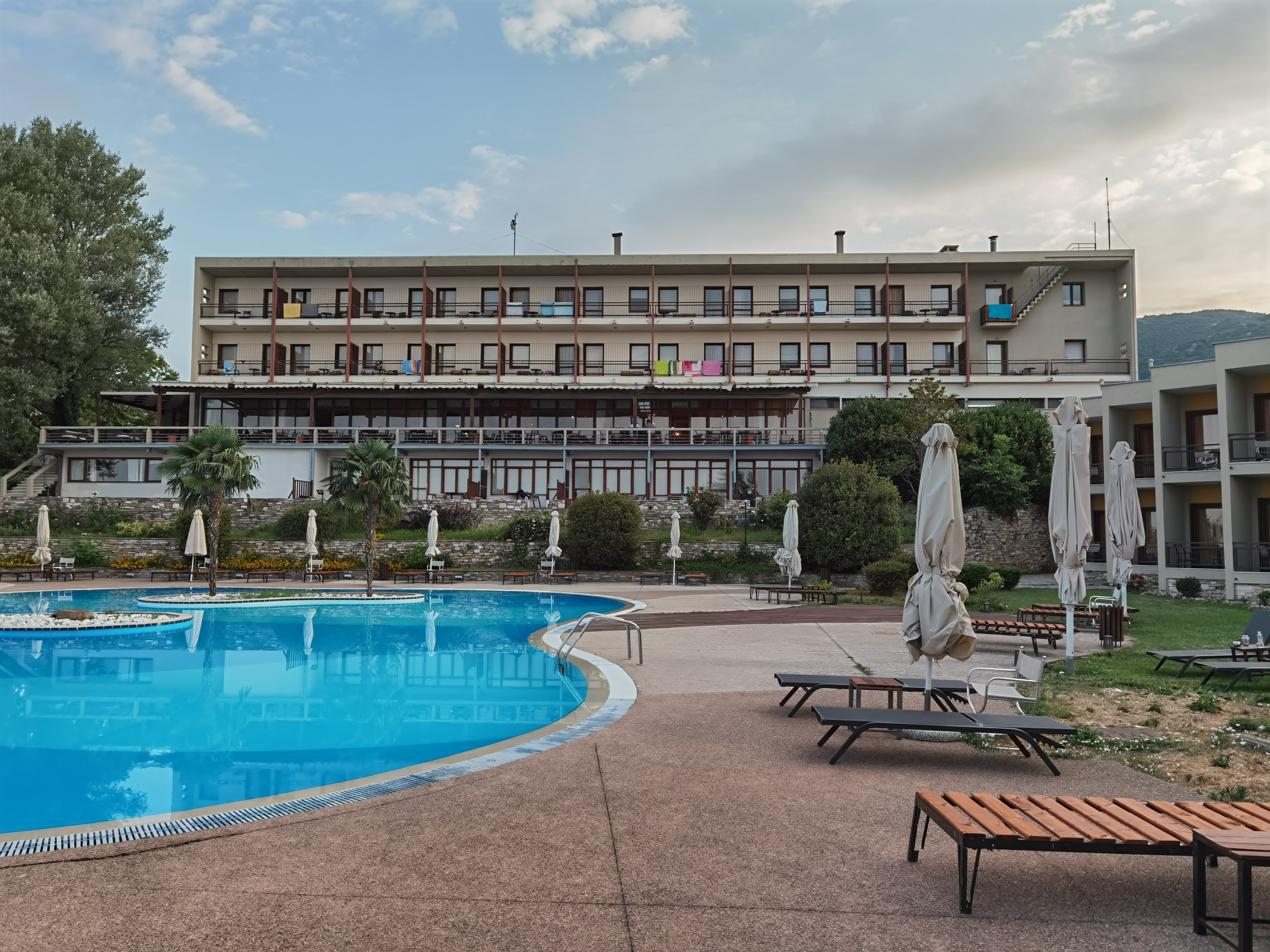
Xenia Portaria (1957), Portaria

Attica Region

- Xenia Poros (1964), Architect A. Konstantinidis
- Xenia Spetses (1960), Architect F. Vokos

Central Macedonia Region

- Xenia Edessa (1963), Architect I. Rizos
- Xenia Paliouri (1962), Architect A. Konstantinidis
- Xenia Platamon (1960), Architect F. Vokos
- Xenia Serres (1960), Architect K. Stamatis
- Xenia Ouranoupoli (1959), Architect P. Sakellariou

Western Macedonia Region

- Xenia Florina (1958), Architect G. Nikoletopoulos
- Xenia Kastoria (1952), Architect Ch. Sfaellos
- Xenia Kozani (1963), Architect K. Levidis

Eastern Macedonia and Thrace Region

- Xenia Xanthi (1964), Architect G. Nikoletopoulos
- Xenia Drama (1961), Architect K. Stamatis
- Xenia Samothrace (1954), Architect K. Spanos
- Xenia Thasos (1955), Architect Ch. Sfaellos

Epirus Region

- Xenia Igoumenitsa (1959), Architect A. Konstantinidis
- Xenia Arta (1958), Architect D. Zivas
- Xenia Ioannina (1958), Architect F. Vokos

Western Greece Region

- Xenia Nafpaktos (1980), Architect P. Manouilidis
- Xenia Olympia (I) (1963), Architect A. Konstantinidis
- Xenia Olympia (II) (1966), Architect A. Konstantinidis
- Xenia Missolonghi (1953), Architect I. Triantafyllidis

Thessaly Region

- Xenia Kalabaka (1960), Architect A. Konstantinidis
- Xenia Larissa (1959), Architect A. Konstantinidis
- Xenia Skopelos (1961), Architect F. Vokos
- Xenia Skiathos (1963), Architect G. Nikoletopoulos
- Xenia Portaria (1957), Architect K. Kitsikis
- Xenia Tsagkarada (1955), Architect Ch. Sfaellos

Central Greece Region

- Xenia Ypati (1956), Architect Ch. Sfaellos
- Xenia Karpenisi (1959), Architect F. Vokos
- Xenia Delphi (1953), Architect D. Pikionis
- Xenia Skyros (1955), Architect G. Doxiadi

Peloponnese Region

- Xenia Nafplio (1958), Architect I. Triantafyllidis
- Xenia Sparta (1958), Architect X. Mpougatsos
- Xenia Vytina (1965), Architect K. Mpitsios

North Aegean Region

- Xenia Samos (1958), Architect K. Stamatis
- Xenia Chios (1958), Architect K. Stamatis
- Xenia Mytilene (1961), Architect I. Antoniadis

South Aegean Region

- Xenia Mykonos (I) (1962), Architect A. Konstantinidis
- Xenia Mykonos (II) (1953), Architect P. Vasiliadi
- Xenia Andros (1958), Architect A. Konstantinidis
- Xenia Paros (1955), Architect A. Konstantinidis
- Xenia Kos (1959), Architect F. Vokos
- Xenia Patmos (1960), Architect M. Dalla
- Xenia Kythnos (1970), Architect E. Tsiller
- Xenia Sifnos (1961), Architect A. Papageorgiou

Ionian Islands Region

- Xenia Corfu (1955), Architect Ch. Sfaellos
- Xenia Argostoli (1955), Architect Ch. Sfaellos
- Xenia Zakynthos (1955), Architects: E. Voureka; P. Vasiliadi; P. Sakellario
- Xenia Cephalonia (1955), Architect Ch. Sfaellos
- Xenia Lefkada (1978), Architect A. Michalakis

Crete Region

- Xenia Karterou (1963), Architect A. Konstantinidis
- Xenia Heraklion (1961), Architect G. Nikoletopoulos
- Xenia Chania (1961), Architects: I. Tzompanaki; S. Kountouri
- Xenia Rethymno (1961), Architect Aik. Dialisma

== See also ==
- Historic Hotels of Europe
