= Alexander Tzonis =

Greek-born architect (1937–2026)

- Αλέξανδρος Τζώνης
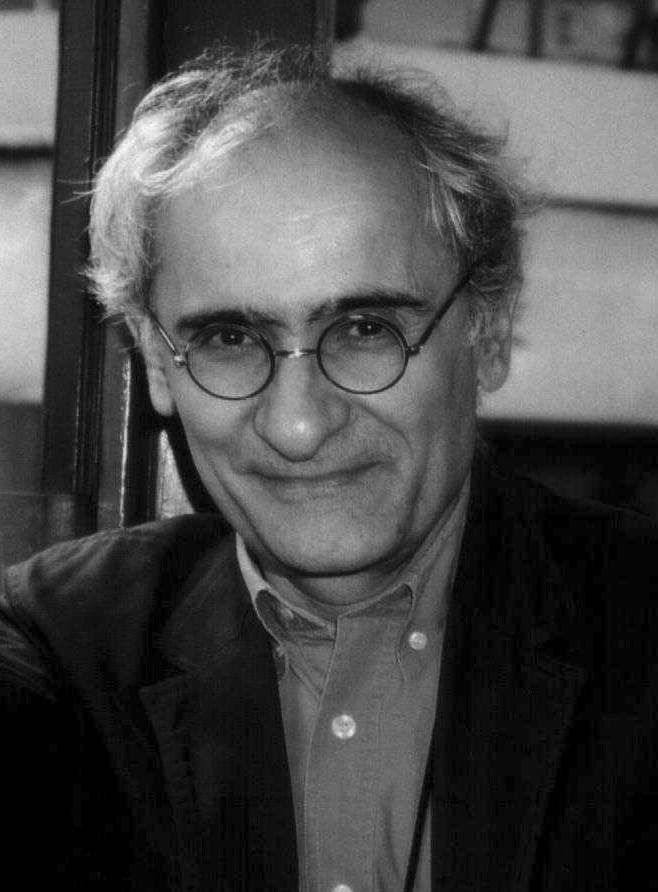
- Born: 8 November 1937; Athens, Greece
- Died: 1 March 2026 (aged 88)
- Spouse: Liane Lefaivre

Academic background
- Education: National Technical University of Athens; Yale University

Academic work
- Discipline: Academic, author, architect
- Institutions: Yale University; Harvard University; Technical University Delft; Tsinghua University
- Notable ideas: Design creativity, critical regionalism

Alexander Tzonis (Greek: Αλέξανδρος Τζώνης; 8 November 1937 – 1 March 2026) was a Greek-born French architect, author and researcher. He made contributions to architectural theory, history and design cognition, bringing together scientific and humanistic approaches in a synthesis. From 1975, he collaborated in most projects with Liane Lefaivre. In 1985, he founded and directed Design Knowledge Systems (DKS), a multidisciplinary research institute for the study of architectural theory and the development of design thinking tools at TU Delft. Tzonis is known for his work on the classical canon, history of the emergence and development of modern architectural thinking, creative design by analogy, and introducing the idea of critical regionalism.

== Background ==
Alexander Tzonis was born in Athens where he attended Athens College. His grandfather, Alexandros Tzonis, (1877–1951) architect, graduated from the Mimar Sinan Fine Arts University in Istanbul in 1901 and practiced in Thessaloniki during the Interwar period. His parents studied in Athens, Graz, and Vienna and were research associates at the Vivarium, Vienna (Prater) under Hans Leo Przibram and at the Kaiser-Wilhelm-Gesellschaft zur Förderung der Wissenschaften, Berlin under Max Hartmann. Between 1941 and 1945 his father, Konstantinos Tzonis, was professor of biology at the Aristotle University of Thessaloniki and his mother, Hariklia Xanthopoulos, the first female chemical engineer in Greece, were both active in politics and in the Greek Resistance.

Tzonis died on 1 March 2026, at the age of 88.

== Education ==
Tzonis studied architecture at the National Technical University of Athens (1956–1961). Between 1955 and 1956, he was instructed privately in painting by Spyros Papaloukas. and by Dimitris Pikionis, by then retired from active teaching at Athens Polytechnic. During his studies in the Polytechnic (1956–61), Tzonis worked in parallel as a stage designer in the theatre and cinema, (as art director of Jules Dassin-directed film, Never on Sunday, 1960) and assisted the painter and stage designer Yannis Tsarouchis.

In 1961, he moved to the United States as a Fulbright and Ford Fellow, where he pursued his studies at Yale University, briefly at the Drama School, and soon after in the School of Art and Architecture under Paul Rudolph, Shadrach Woods, Robert Venturi, and Serge Chermayeff.

== Career ==
In 1965, with sponsorship from the Twentieth Century Fund, he was appointed a fellow at Yale, where he carried out research on Planning and Design Methodology in collaboration with Chermayeff with whom he went on to co-author The Shape of Community (1972).

In 1968 he was appointed at the Graduate School of Design at Harvard University by Jerzy Soltan and Josep Lluis Sert as assistant professor and in 1975 he became associate professor. He taught and did advanced research in analytical design methods in association with Walter Isard and Ovadia Salama, receiving outside advice from Anatol Rapaport and Seymour Papert. In collaboration with Ovadia Salama, he introduced the newly developed method ELECTRE for multi-criteria evaluation of design projects (1975).

In 1972, he was invited by the French Ministry of Culture to spend a year in France (Strasbourg) where he taught, researched, and wrote, joined by Liane Lefaivre (married in 1973), and working closely with the young generation of French architecture critics and historians (Bruno Fortier, Philip Boudon).

Returning to Harvard, he set up a multi-disciplinary collaborative research project to develop a discourse method for analyzing French architectural theory texts, funded by the French Government (1974–1975). The research participants included Michael Freeman, Etienne de Cointet, Ovadia Salama, Liane Lefaivre and his undergraduate student Robert Berwick, (later professor of computational linguistics at MIT).

Reacting to the socio-environmental urban crisis of the 1960s and the inability of mainstream architecture to cope with it, he wrote Towards a Non-oppressive Environment (Cambridge, 1974) that dealt with the historical roots and the underlying conflicts of the crisis. It was soon translated in six languages. Following its publication, Tzonis introduced at Harvard the critical-historical study of modern design thinking and initiated the teaching of History of Design Methodology, for the first time internationally.

In 1981, while the Graduate School of Design was undergoing major changes with Gerald McCue succeeding Maurice D. Kilbridge as Dean of the School, Tzonis moved to the Netherlands as Crown Professor of design methodology at the Delft University of Technology TUD) where he founded and directed Design Knowledge Systems, (1985–2005) a multi-disciplinary research institute on Architectural Cognition. Among the collaborators were Joop Doorman, (TUD), along with Donald Schön and William Porter both from MIT, Daniel Shefer from the Technion, and Liane Lefaivre, co-professor at [the Universität für angewandte Kunst], Vienna.

== Creative design by analogy ==
Key to his approach was that Analytical computation, far from obstructing design creativity, enhances it; and that design innovation “leaps” are mostly achieved through spatial-functional analogies, recruiting and recombining design components and design rules from a thesaurus of precedents, including concrete objects or abstract theories from very distant domains. The way to observe how this recruiting works is to look at design thinking through the framework of morphology, operation, and performance. Design analysis and analogy, which are usually seen as rivals, are, actually, complementary allies in creative design. Design by Analogy was one of the major research themes of Design Knowledge Systems. The theory of design creativity by analogy was further explored and discussed by Tzonis and Lefaivre in cases of designers, in history and contemporary, on: Leonardo da Vinci (1989), Le Corbusier (2001), and co-authored with Lefaivre, Aldo van Eyck (1999) and on Santiago Calatrava (1999, 2001, 2004).

== The canon of classical architecture and emergence of modern architecture ==
Tzonis and Lefaivre investigated and discussed the canon of classical architecture as a cultural-historical and cognitive phenomenon. The idea was presented in Classical Architecture: The Poetics of Order (1986, translated in seven languages including Japanese, Chinese, and Korean). James S. Ackerman wrote about the book that it ‘reveals the principles that link the great masters of the tradition from Vitruvius to Mies’. While differing in many fundamental ideas from Tzonis and Lefaivre, John Summerson called it ‘a … must … for anybody who proposes to take classical architecture seriously’, and David Watkin that it ‘should be read by all students … as well as by those who still believe that the classical orders are outdated and irrelevant’. Pursuing the same lines of investigation into the 1990s, Tzonis focused on the cognitive underpinnings of the classical design rule system as well as its historical origins, publishing in 2004 Classical Greek Architecture, the Construction of the Modern, co-authored with P Giannisi (English, French, and German editions).

== Critical regionalism ==
Tzonis and Lefaivre coined the term ‘Critical Regionalism’ employing the concept of regionalism whose origins go as far back as Vitruvius, to deal with a current problem: the need to define a role for buildings and cities in a planet that seems to be united only by technological media and ‘globalization’, and divided by confrontation and competition. In this role, designers whether solving problems or exploring possibilities, should think critically – in the Kantian sense. They should overcome biases favoring imported or local choices through questioning and reflection, considering the specifics of the actual situation, the region. While welcoming what the open world can offer give a hand to interaction and exchange, they should value the uniqueness of the ‘region’, the quality of social ties, the physical and cultural resources.

This idea of regionalism that goes back to Mumford’s pre-WWII criticism of the Beaux Arts, the International Style, and the post-WWII ‘modernist’ planning, differs fundamentally from the uses of regionalism of the past that employed the region as a defensive or offensive concept, a political or marketing construct promoting chauvinist movements, but also folklore commercialism.

This new approach to regionalism was first presented in 1981, in ‘The Grid and the Pathway,’ an essay published in Architecture in Greece, and the same year in another essay - written in collaboration with Anthony Alofsin, a student assistant of Tzonis at that time - included in Fur eine andere Architektur. The Swiss sociologist, writer and artist Lucius Burckhardt, the leading editor of the book, invited Tzonis and Lefaivre to contribute an essay which prompted a chain of studies and numerous debates and symposia – among them the International Working Seminar on Critical Regionalism organized by Marvin Malecha and Spyros Amourgis (1989) hosted by the California State Polytechnic University, Pomona - and inspired projects around the world.

== Academic general editor ==
Parallel to his teaching, research and writing, Tzonis worked as academic general editor with Penguin Books during the first part of the 1970s initiating the multidisciplinary series Man Made Environment. During the second part of 1970s, after a failed attempt to edit a multi-volume Harvard Encyclopedia of Architecture, with Gavin Borden (the president of Garland Publishing) as publisher, he undertook as general editor the multi-volume Garland Architectural Archives, one of the largest architectural publishing projects with over seventy volumes.

== Visiting professorships and affiliations ==
Tzonis was a visiting professor at the National University Singapore, (2006–2007), Massachusetts Institute of Technology (1996), the Technion, Israël Institute of Technology, (1985), Columbia University, (1974–1975), Institut d'Architecture et d'Urbanisme, Strasbourg, (1972–1973), Technische Universiteit Eindhoven (1977), the Université de Montréal (1970–1971). In 2002 he was invited to teach a course at College de France on ‘Architecture and Spatial Intelligence’.

- Registered architect, Member of the Technical Chamber of Greece (1961)
- Fellow of the Royal Society of Arts appointed on 9 March (1970)
- Fellow at the Shenkar College of Engineering and Design in Israel (2012)
- Ηοnorary Doctor of the Aristotle University of Thessaloniki (2017)
- Honorary Member of the Hong Kong Institute of Architects (2019)
- Societe Française d’Etude du 18 siècle, 1975
- Member of AAAI and AAAS, 1996
- Société des auteurs dans les arts graphiques et plastiques (ADAGP) 2019
- Société Francaçaise des Interets des auteures de l’Ecrit (SOFIA) 2019

== Selected books ==
- Shape of Community, Harmondsworth: Penguin Books, 1970, co-author Serge Chermayeff (also in Italian)
- Towards a Non-Oppressive Environment, Cambridge: MIT Press, 1972 (also in French, Spanish, Dutch)
- Drawings from the Le Corbusier Archive, London: Architectural Design, 1985
- Classical Architecture, The Poetics of Order, Cambridge: MIT Press, 1986, co-author L. Lefaivre (also in French, German, Dutch)
- Hermes and the Golden Thinking Machine, Cambridge: MIT Press, 1990 (also in German, Dutch)
- Architecture in Europe since 1968, Memory and Invention, London: Thames and Hudson and New York: Rizzoli, 1992, co-author L. Lefaivre (also in Spanish, German)
- Automation Based Creative Design, Research and Perspectives, Amsterdam: Elsevier, 1994, co-editor Ian White
- Movement, Structure and the Work of Santiago Calatrava, Basel: Birkhäuser, 1995, co-author L. Lefaivre
- Architecture in North America since 1960, London: Thames and Hudson and Boston: Little Brown, 1995, co-author L. Lefaivre and Richard Diamond (also in German)
- Santiago Calatrava, The Poetics of Movement, New York: Universe Publishing, Rizzoli, 1999 (also in French, Italian)
- Aldo van Eyck, Humanist Rebel, Rotterdam: 010 Publishers, 1999, co-author L. Lefaivre,
- Tropical Architecture, Critical Regionalism in an Age of Globalization, London: Wiley-Academy 2001 co-authors L. Lefaivre and Bruno Stagno
- Santiago Calatrava's Creative Process, Basel: Birkhäuser, 2001, co-author L. Lefaivre
- Le Corbusier, The Poetics of Machine and Metaphor, New York: Universe and London: Thames and Hudson, 2001 (also in French, Italian)
- Critical regionalism, Architecture and Identity in a Globalized World, Munich, Berlin, London, New York: Prestel, 2003, co-author L. Lefaivre, (also in Chinese)
- The Emergence of Modern Architecture, London: Routledge, 2004, co-author L. Lefaivre,
- Santiago Calatrava, The Bridges, New York: Rizzoli, 2005, Co-author Rebeca Caso Donadei (also in Spanish)
- Classical Greek Architecture, the Construction of the Modern, Paris, London, Munich, New York: Flammarion, 2004, co-author Phoebe Giannisi
- Santiago Calatrava, The Complete Works, New York: Rizzoli, 2004, expanded edition, 2006 (also in Chinese, Spanish, Italian)
- Santiago Calatrava, The Athens Olympics, New York: Rizzolli, 2006
- Architecture of Regionalism in the Age of Globalization, Peaks and Valleys in the Flat World, New York, 2012, co-author Liane Lefaivre (also in French, Chinese)
- Greece: Modern Architectures in History, London: Reaktion Books, 2013, Co-author Alkistis Rodi
- Architecture of Jacques Ferrier, London: Thames and Hudson, 2016, co-author Kenneth Powell
- Times of Creative Destruction: Shaping Buildings and Cities in the late C20TH, London, 2017, co-author Liane Lefaivre

== Selected articles and essays ==
- "Transformations of the Initial Structure", Perspecta 12, 1969
- "The last identity crisis in architecture", Connection (Spring) 1969
- "Problems of Judgement in Programmatic Analysis in Architecture", DMG DRS Journal (Jul.-Sept.) 1974, co-author O. Salama,
- "The populist movement in architecture", Bauwelt 10 (Jan.) 1975 co-author L. Lefaivre,
- "The Mechanical vs. Divine Body. The rise of modern design theory in Europe", Journal of Architectural Education (Sept.) 1975
- “History of design as a social science”, Harvard Publication Series, 1977 co-author L. Lefaivre,
- "The Narcissist Phase in Architecture", Harvard Architectural Review 1, 1978 co-author L. Lefaivre,
- "The Question of Autonomy in Architecture", Harvard Architectural Review 3, 1984, co-author L. Lefaivre,
- "Il bastione comme mentalità", La Città el mura, edited by C. de Seta and J. Le Goff, Rome, 1989 co-author L. Lefaivre,
- "Lewis Mumford's Regionalism", Design Book Review 19 (Fall), 1991, co-author L. Lefaivre,
- "Critical Regionalism", Critical Regionalism, edited by S. Amourgis, Pomona: California state Polytechnic University, pp. 3–23, 1991, co-author L. Lefaivre
- "Huts, ships and bottle racks: Design by analogy for architects and/or machines", Research in Design Thinking, edited by N. Cross, K. Dorst and N. Roozenburg, Delft: Delft Univ. Press, pp. 139–164, 1992. In German Archithese (May-Jun.) 1990.
- "Beyond Monuments, Beyond Zip-a-tone, Into Space/Time: Contextualizing Shadrach Woods's Berlin Free University, A Humanist Architecture”, Free University Berlin, Candilis, Josic, Woods, Schiedhelm, Architectural Association, Exemplary Projects 3, London, pp. 118–141, 1999, co-author L. Lefaivre.
- "Architektur seit 1968", ARCH+ 139/140, 1889, co-author L. Lefaivre,
- "Pikionis and Transvisibility", Thresholds, special issue: The Invisible, 1999.
- "L'Architecture au Collège de France, L'Intelligence Spatiale", AMC116, (May) 2001.
- “Evolving Spatial Intelligence Tools, From Architectural Poetics to Management Methods”, Managing as Designing, edited by Richard J. Boland Jr. and Fred Collopy, Stanford, California: Stanford University Press, 2004.
- “Redefining environmental quality”, Building Research & Information 33(3), 2005.
- “Thoughts on South African Architecture today”, DIGEST of South African Architecture 2006/2007, 2006.
- “The lost years?”, 25 Years of Critical Reflection on Architecture Oase 75, 2008.
- “Globalist moment in a universe of regions Regionalist place in a globalized world”, My 32m² apartment, a 30-year transformation, Gary Chang. Introduction, Tzonis Alexander, 2008.
- “The City is not a building”, China City Planning Review Vol.20, No.2, 2011.
- “Michelangelo visto da Battisti come nostro contemporaneo”, Michelangelo fortuna di un mito, Leo S.Olschki editore, 2012.
- “Michelangelo visto da Battisti como nostro contemporaneo”, Michelangelo fortuna di un mito. Cinquecento anni di critica litteraria e artistica. Firenze, 2012.
- “Region Making”, Journal of the National Academy of Art, Vol.34, No.8, 2013. co-author L. Lefaivre,
- “Architectural education at the crossroads”, Frontiers in Architectural Research, vol.3, number 1, March 2014, Higher Education Press, 2014.
- “Architectural education at the crossroads”, Frontiers of Architectural research (volume 3, number 1, march), 2014.
- “Putting on a Pretty Face”, “Fundamental”? Venice Architecture Biennale. Beijing (293, nov.), 2014.
- “A framework for architectural education”, Frontiers of Architectural research (volume 3, number 4, december), 2014.
- “Architectural education at the crossroads”, Frontiers of Architectural Research, Delft, 2014.
- “Architectural education: the core and the local”, Frontiers of Architectural Research, Delft, 2014.
- “Creativity real and imagined education”, Frontiers of Architectural Research, Delft, 2014.
- “A framework for architectural education”, Frontiers of Architectural Research, Delft, 2014.
- “On stars and the Environmental Gap”, Urban Design (n°2), Tsinghua, 2015.
- “Cheng Taining’s oeuvre: Buildings, thoughts, and visions”, The Master architect series Cheng Taining architecture, Victoria, 2017.
- “Buildings we call palaces”, Ancient Egyptian and ancient near eastern palaces (Volume 1), Vienna, 2018.
- “Rainbow Bouquet”: For the 100th Anniversary of Aldo van Eyck, The Architect August No.194, Nanjing, 2018. co-author L. Lefaivre,

Tzonis also published "Ten Lithographs Designed By Manfred Ibel and Alexander Tzonis On Ten Poems By Constantine Cavafy" The poems were translated for this publication by Stephen Spender and Nicos Stangos. The portfolio was printed by the Carl Purington Rollins / Printing-Office of the Yale University Press New Haven, Connecticut, 1966.

== Symposia ==
Tzonis conceived and organized several major international symposia. Among them:

- The German Werkbund, The Pleasures of Form and the Realities of Life, hosted by the Graduate School of Design, Harvard University among the participants: S. Anderson, L. Burckhardt, H.L.C. Jaffé, R. Pommer, J. Posener, E. Sekler, (1980).
- Automation Based Creative Design Education, at the TUDelft: An international conference in the framework of the 150th Anniversary of the university and the American Collegiate Schools of Architecture Meeting in Europe, (1992).
- Architecture in Israel, 1948–1998, a DKS symposium, T.U. Delft, (1998).
- The Spiritual in Architecture, a Symposium dedicated to the Holocaust Memorial in Berlin by Daniel Libeskind hosted by Her Majesty Queen Beatrix at the Royal Palace in Amsterdam, under the auspices of the Royal Palace Foundation, (2000).
- The Mediterranean Landscape, Representation Designs and Identity, (1997), and The Mediterranean City, among the participants: J. Ackerman, S. Calatrava, H. Herzberger, D. Karavan, L. Lefaivre, E. Miralles both in collaboration with Michael Levin, hosted by Mishkenot Sha’ananim in Jerusalem. (2002)
- "The (Untold ?) Incomplete Story of the Alexander Tzonis Collection of Posters of the Harvard Strike, Spring 1969" – “An Interview of Harvey Hacker to Liane Lefaivre”; Spring Torrents – Harvard Strike Posters, Spring 1969, Thessaloniki, (24 October 2018).

== Exhibitions ==
- Il Lugo del Lavoro, The 17th Triennale di Milano, 1986
- 1. The Architect and the Workplace: Key project which shaped the quality of the workplace in the XXth century.
- 2. Architecture of the Workplace: Student competition.
- Urit Luden, The Golem, The Wealth of Architecture, N.A.I., Rotterdam, 1 April – 7 May 1995
- Santiago Calatrava, Structures in Movement, Dallas, Texas, Meadows Museum, Southern Methodist University. Exhibition conceived and curated

== See also ==
- Santiago Calatrava
