= Liane Lefaivre =

Architectural historian

Liane Lefaivre is a Canadian and Austrian Professor Ordinaria of Architectural History and Theory at the University of Applied Art in Vienna Austria, now retired.

== Background ==
Lefaivre completed her undergraduate degree at McGill University and her doctorate at the University of Utrecht.

Her writing and research relates to two formative modern periods: first, from the Renaissance to the end of the Enlightenment, and second from the late nineteenth century to the present. She coined, with Alexander Tzonis, her partner in work and in life since 1972, the concept of Critical Regionalism, inspired by the wide-ranging aesthetic, historical, political and environmentalist writings of Lewis Mumford and they have published widely on the topic of critical regionalism as a global phenomenon, in English, Spanish, Portuguese, French, Greek, German, Chinese and Japanese.

== Books ==
- Les Systèmes Conceptuels de l’Architecture, with Alexander Tzonis, Michael Freeman, Ovadia Salama, Robert Berwick, Etienne de Cointet (Cambridge, MA., Harvard Graduate School of Design, 1976)
- De Oorsprong van de moderne architectuur (The Origins of Modern Architecture)(in Dutch Nijmegen, SUN: 1984, now in its second printing) with Alexander Tzonis.
- Het architectonisch denken (Architectural Thinking) (Nijmegen, SUN, 1991) with Alexander Tzonis.
- Classical Architecture The Poetics of Order (Cambridge, MA., The MIT Press, 1986. Now in its 11th printing and translated into French, Spanish, German and Japanese) with Alexander Tzonis.
- Architecture in Europe since 1968 (London, Thames and Hudson; New York, Rizzoli, 1993) now in paperback (1997) with Alexander Tzonis.
- Architecture in North America since 1960 (Boston, Little, Brown; London, Thames and Hudson, 1995) with Alexander Tzonis and Richard Diamond.
- Leon Battista Alberti’s Hypnerotomachia Poliphili (Cambridge, MA., The MIT Press, 1996)
- Movement and Structure in the Work of Santiago Calatrava (Basel, Birkhäuser, 1996) with Alexander Tzonis.
- Aldo van Eyck Humanist Rebel. Inbetweening in a Postwar World (Rotterdam, 010, 1999) with Alexander Tzonis.
- Tropical Architecture; Critical Regionalism in an Age of Globalization (London, Wiley, 2001) with Alexander Tzonis and Bruno Stagno.
- The Emergence of the Modern. 1000-1800 (London, Routledge, 2003) with Alexander Tzonis.
- Critical Regionalism. Architectural Identity in a Globalized World (Munich, Prestel, 2003) with Alexander Tzonis.
- Santiago Calatrava’s Creative Process (Basel, Birkhäuser, 2003) with Alexander Tzonis.
- Like a Bird. The Architecture of Santiago Calatrava (Milan, Skira, 2003).
- Ground-Up City; Play as a Design Tool (Rotterdam, 010, 2006) in collaboration with Henk Doll.
- The Child, the City and the Power of Play, or the PIP Principle (Beijing, Tsinghua University, 2010)
- Architecture of Regionalism in a Global Age. Hills and Valleys in the Flat World (London, Routledge, 2012) with Alexander Tzonis.
- Times of Creative Destruction. (London, Routledge, 2017) with Alexander Tzonis.
- Modernist Rebels, Viennese Architecture since Otto Wagner (London, Lund Humphries, 2017)

== Awards and grants ==
Her Leon Battista Alberti's Hypnerotomachia Poliphili. (Cambridge, MA., The M.I.T. Press: 1997) won: The Association of American Publishers Award for Best New Scholarly/Professional Book of 1997; The American association of Architects Annual Award for Best Book (in history) for 1997 and The Association of American University Publishers Award (in the category of illustrated books) for 1997. Architecture in Europe since 1960 was a New York Times Book of the Year in 1995 and won the American Association of Architects Annual Award for best book in criticism. Her Rebel Modernists. Viennese Architecture since Otto Wagner was chosen as a book of the year in June 2017 by the Financial Times. She has been the recipient of a Graham Foundation grant in Chicago and a grant from the FWF in Austria.

== Articles and lectures ==
Her articles have appeared in Architecture, Architectural Record, Archithese, Korean Architect, A+U, Wonen/TABK, the magazine of the Architecture School of Tsinghua University in Beijing, Arquitectura & Vivienda, Arquitectura Viva, Forum, Design Book Review, Casabella, AMC (Architecture, Mouvement, Continuite), La revue du dix-huitieme siecle, Daedalos, A.A.Files, the Harvard Architecture Review, The Architect’s Newspaper, the New Village Journal, Pin-Up, Harvard Design Magazine and Der Standard.

She has lectured at the National Gallery in Washington, DC, Columbia University, MIT, Princeton University, the University of California, Berkeley, the Polytechnic University of Milan, the Sapienza University of Rome, the Technion in Haifa, University of Cambridge, Institut Francais d’Architecture in Paris, the ACSA Meeting in Havana Cuba, the University of California, San Diego, Woodbury College in Los Angeles, the University of Michigan, Betzalel Academy in Jerusalem, Technische Universität Berlin, at the First Shenzhen Biennale in 2007, Tongji University in Shanghai, Tsinghua University in Beijing, the Central Academy of Art in Beijing, the Technical University of Istanbul, the Academy of Art in Hangzhou, the Federal University of Sao Paulo, the Federal University of Rio, and the Federal University of Brasilia, the College de France, McGill University, the Lee Kuan Yew Center for Innovative Cities, the Singapore Institute of Technology and Design, Shenkar Academy in Tel Aviv, WIZO Academy in Haifa, Clemson University, Yale University and Southeast University in Nanjing, the ETH in Zurich, the Museum für angewandte Kunst (The MAK) in Vienna.

== Exhibition curating ==
In 2002 she curated the exhibition at the Stedelijk Museum in Amsterdam under Rudi Fuchs based on her original research into Aldo van Eyck's playgrounds, edited the exhibition catalogue Aldo Van Eyck, The Playgrounds and the City (Summer 2002).

In 2003 she has curated an exhibition and edited a catalogue of the work of Santiago Calatrava entitled Santiago Calatrava. Like a Bird at the Kunsthistorisches Museum under Wilfried Seipel in collaboration with the Naturhistorisches Museum in Vienna, the first exhibition to bring the two museums together (Spring 2003).

In October 2010, she curated with Professor Li Kaisheng of the Chinese Academy of Art in Hangzhou the work of their joint students for a post-traumatic (the earthquake in Sichuan province of 2008) urban design plan based on playgrounds in Dujiangyuan at the Shanghai Art Biennale.

== Affiliations ==
She is a member of the board of The Journal of Architecture (Royal Society of Architects, London), and she has been on the boards of Design Book Review (Berkeley), and Archithèse (Zurich) and Architecture (New York), Architect’s Newspaper (New York) Cahiers de la Recherche (French Ministry of Culture, Paris).
