= Hagia Triada Cathedral, Piraeus =

Church in Piraeus, Greece

Hagia Triada Cathedral
- Καθεδρικός Ναός Αγίας Τριάδος
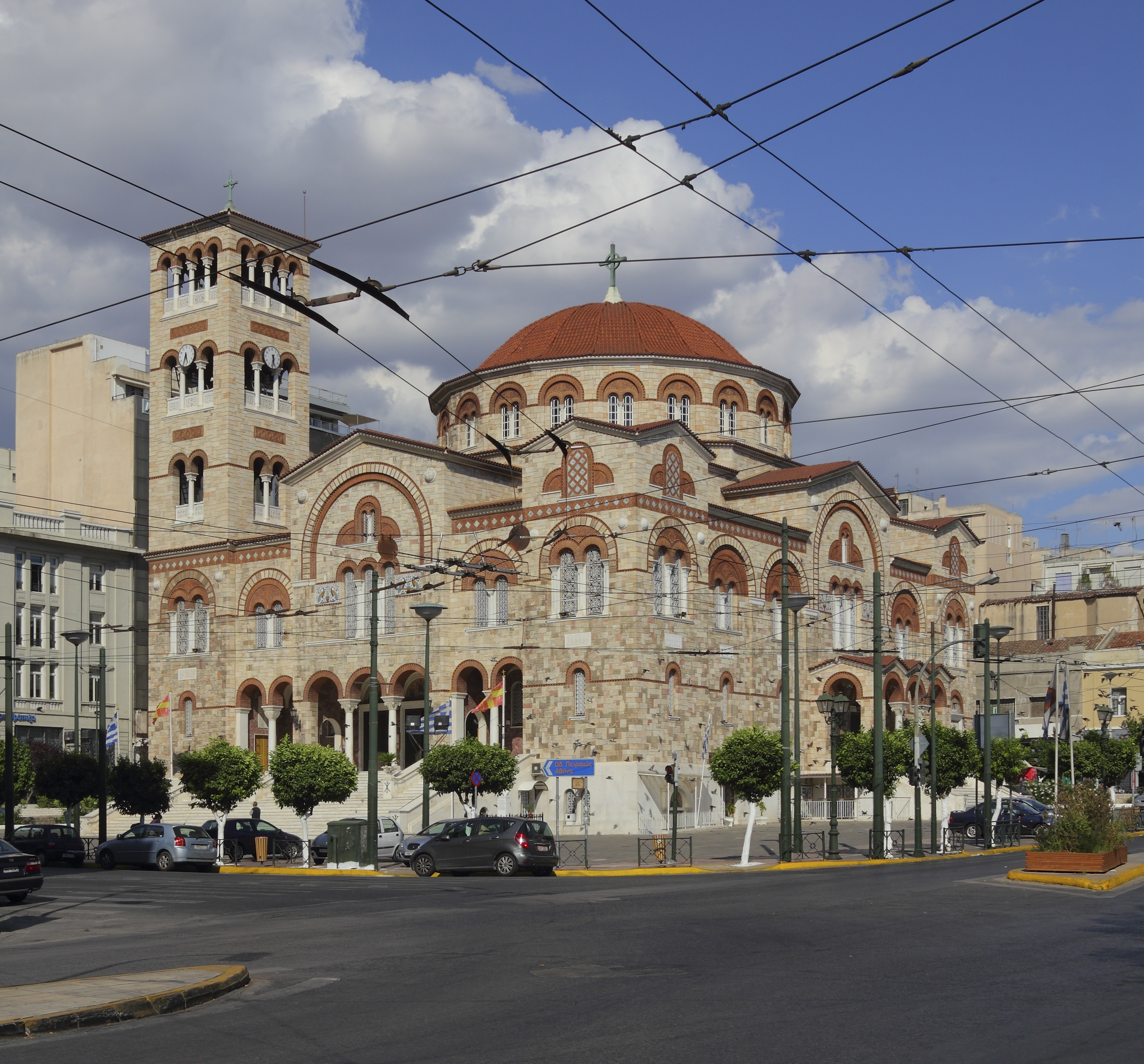

- 37°56′39.44″N 23°38′42.9″E
- Location: Piraeus
- Country: Greece
- Language: Greek
- Denomination: Greek Orthodox

History
- Status: Open
- Consecrated: 1964

Architecture
- Architect: Goergios Nomikos
- Architectural type: Neo-Byzantine
- Completed: 1979

Specifications
- Capacity: 3100

Administration
- Metropolis: Metropolis of Piraeus

The Hagia Triada Cathedral ("Holy Trinity"; Greek: Ιερός Καθεδρικός Ναός Αγίας Τριάδος, romanized: Hierós Kathedrikós Naós Hagías Triádos, lit. 'Sacred Cathedral Temple of the Holy Trinity') is a Greek Orthodox church in the city of Piraeus, in Greece. The largest church in its community, Hagia Triada is the cathedral and the metropolitan seat of the Holy Metropolis of Piraeus. The current building, as it stands today, was constructed in 1979, though a church on that site was first built in 1839.

== History ==
=== First and second churches ===
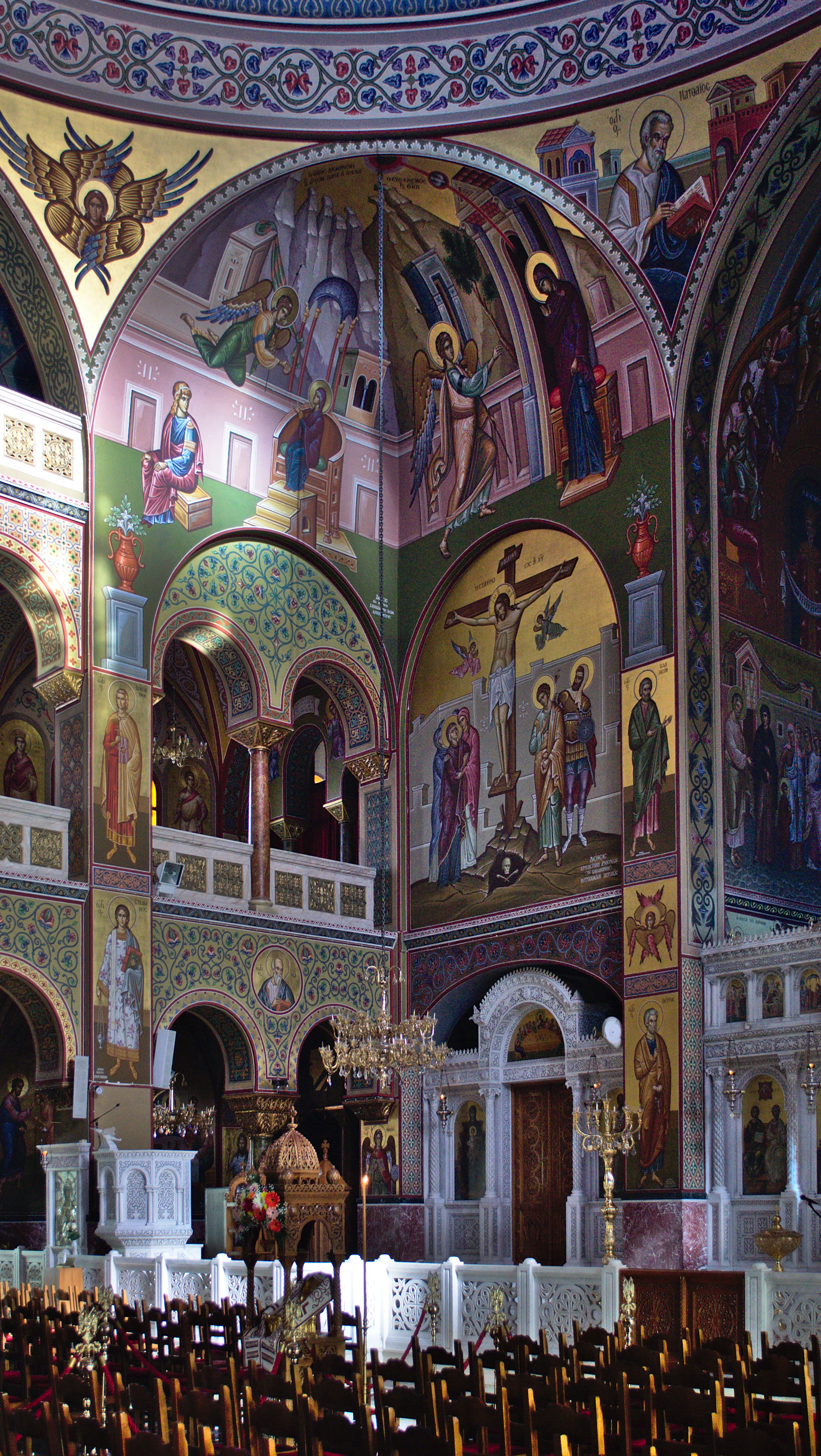
Interior of the church.

Construction of the original church began in 1839, just a few years after Greece had gained independence from the Ottoman Empire, with its mural decoration finished in 1844, five years later. It was completed by 1845. That first church was completely demolished one hundred years later, on January 11 1944, during the bombing of the city of Piraeus by the Allies, resulting in the death of several people who had taken refuge inside the church for protection. In the summer of the same year, a makeshift church was built at the centre of the ruins, to serve the parishioners; this provisional church stood there for twelve years.

=== Third and current church ===
In 1950, the Pampiraic Association for the Restoration of the Holy Metropolitan Church of the Holy Trinity of Piraeus was founded with Miltiadis Pouris serving as its first president. The purpose of the association was the restoration of Hagia Trias in Piraeus, its completion and maintenance. After several discussions and counter-complaints, it was decreed with the intervention of the Archbishop of Athens, Spyridon and the Minister of Public Works, Georgios Rallis, to build a new building, one larger than the previous one and at the exact same location as it.

Works for the new church of Hagia Trias of Piraeus began on a Sunday, June 17, 1956, in the presence of the Archbishop of Athens Dorotheos, the Greek ministers of Education P. Leventis and Social Welfare Lina Tsaldari and the Deputy Minister of Finance D. Aliprantis, the local authorities and other officials.

During the excavations, various ancient vases, gold coins, mosaics, inscriptions and other objects were found, which led to the Greek Archaeological Service deciding to put a stop to the excavations and the new church's constriction. At the same time, the municipality of Piraeus reclaimed the plot. Following the persistent actions of both Archbishop Dorotheos and Miltiadis Pouris, both the municipality and the Greek Archaeological Service dropped their claims and the construction of the new church continued, keeping intact the parts of the ancient buildings, which visitors today can visit and admire in the chapel of Saints Cyril and Methodius.

The inauguration of the new church took place on May 17, 1964, while its construction was finally completed in 1979, based on the blueprints of Georgios Nomikos. The works for the church's iconography, undertaken by Stephanos Almaliotos and his student Anargyros Liakos, continued.

== Architecture ==
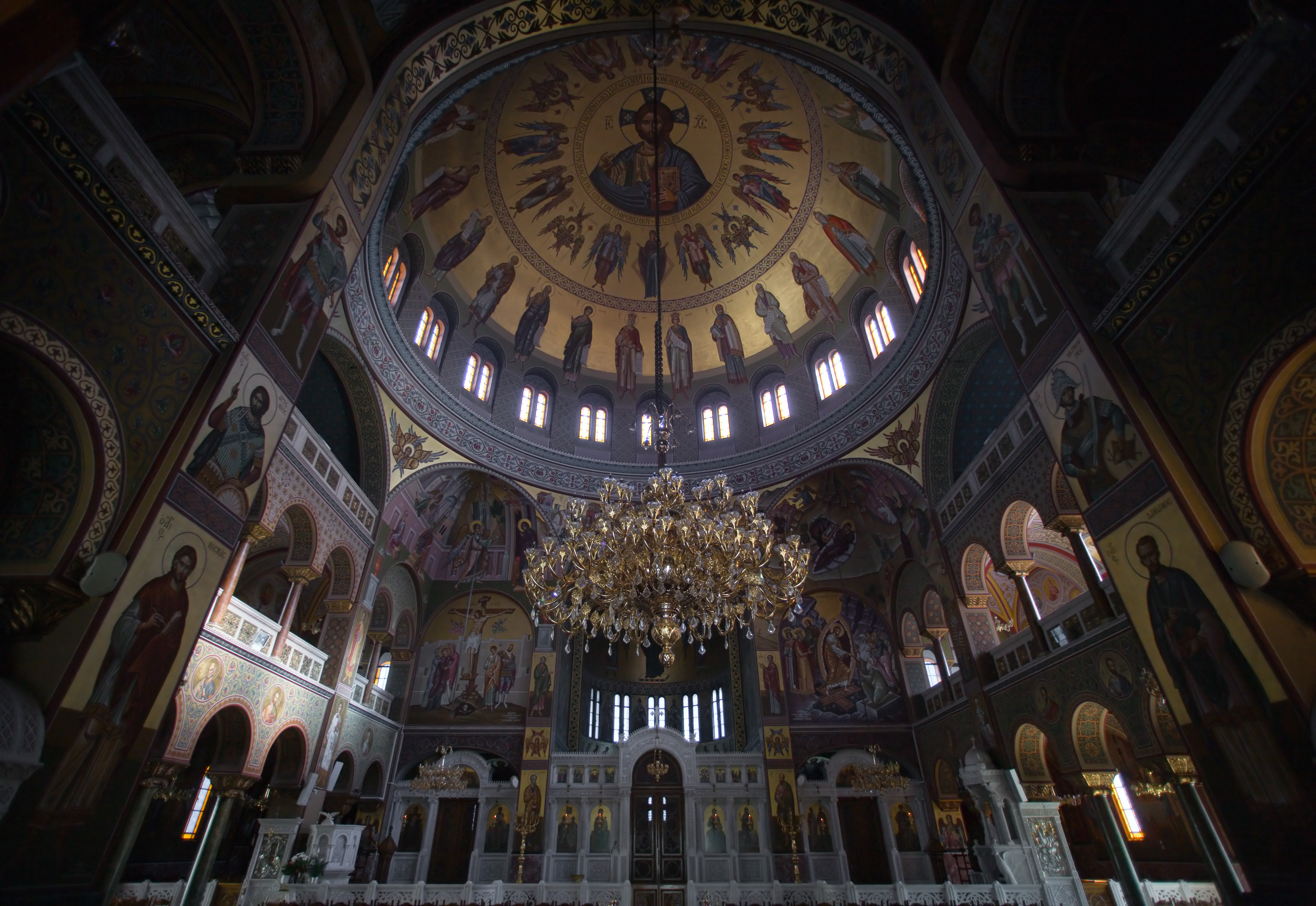
The dome of Hagia Triada

Hagia Triada is a three-aisled church. The central aisle is dedicated to the Holy Trinity, the one to the right to the First Apostles Peter and Paul and the one to the left to Saint Skepi. Two chapels are incorporated into this large building: that of Saint Nectarius and that of Saints Cyril and Methodius, the Apostles; in the latter a section of the Long Walls is housed to this day.

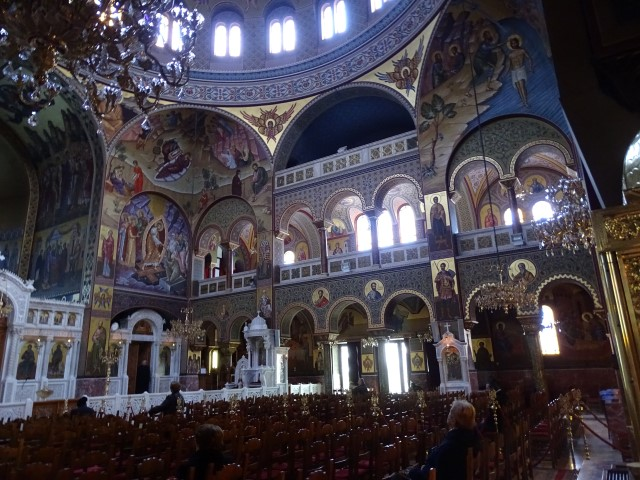
Interior.

The church was built in Byzantine style with a capacity of 3,100 people and an area of 835 square meters on the ground floor. Its large dome contains 40 windows and rests on 8 spherical triangles and 8 large arches. Thanks to the dome's support and its large diameter, it is visible from every point of the church, even from the entrances. Hagia Triada's external doors are made of forged brass. Its ornate marble iconostasis is the work of the Doukas brothers, while the wood-carved doors of the iconostasis are the work of Theophilos Nomikos. The decoration with murals of the church began during the term of Mayor Aristidis Skylitsis, to whom the late industrialist Bodosakis offered a significant sum of money. The Mayor allocated this amount for the purchase of gold leaf necessary for the canonization of the Church.

The first iconographer of the Church was the late Stephanos Almaliotis. Following his death, the iconography of the church was continued by his assistant and student Anargyros Liakos who followed the style of his teacher. Almaliotis had been inspired by the Macedonian School mainly but also the Cretan School, resulting in a unique Byzantine depiction of the Biblical figures.

In the yard stands a statue of Constantine XI Palaiologos, the last emperor of the Eastern Roman Empire.

== Gallery ==
Hagia Triada

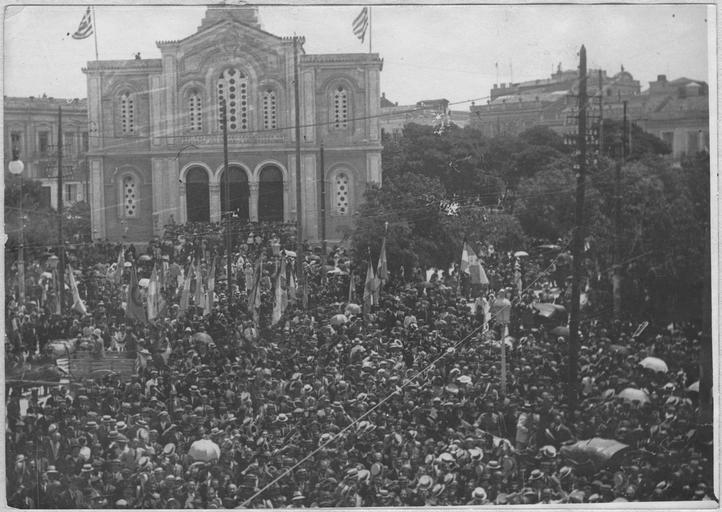
The old church in 1917.

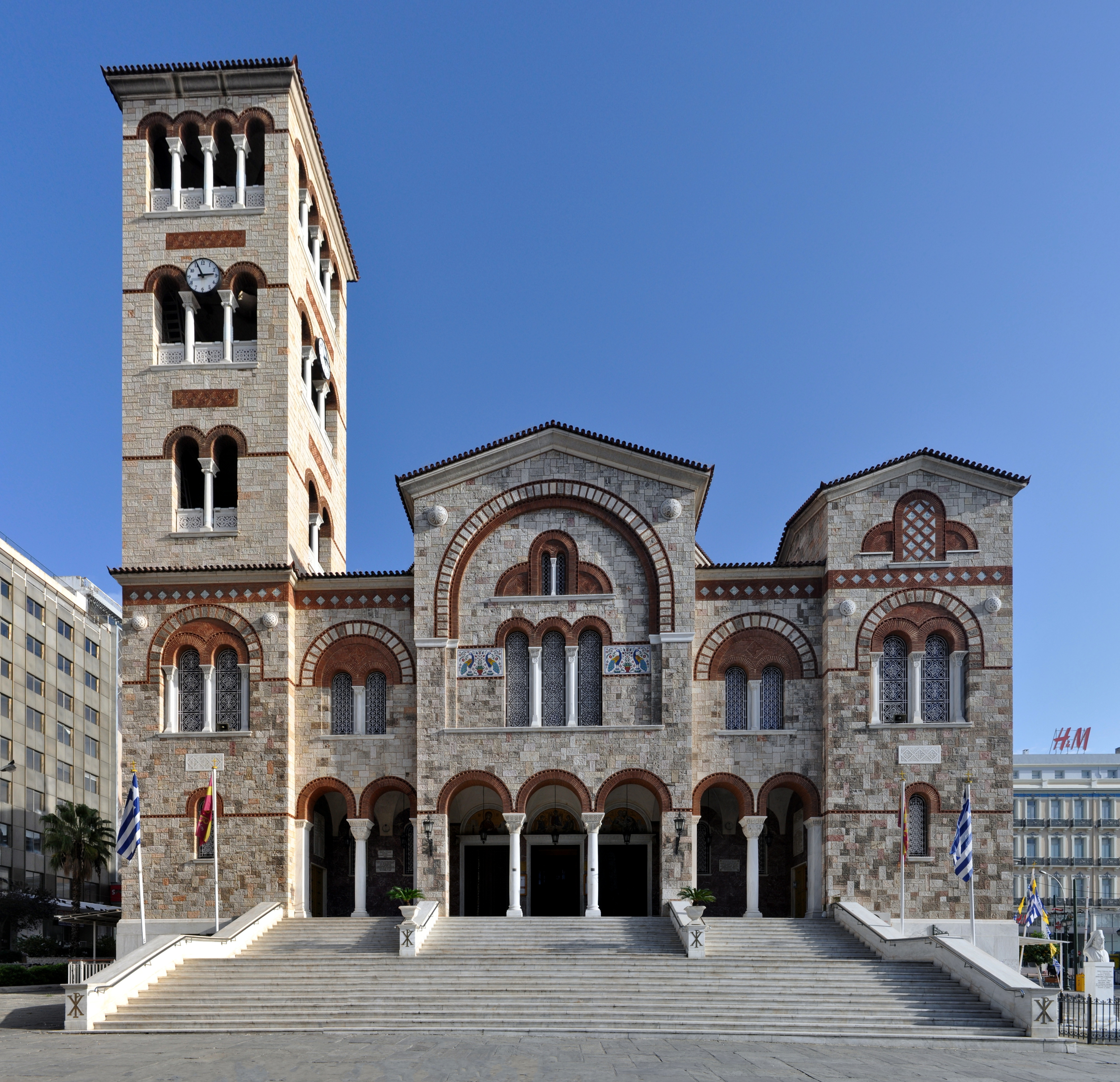
Façade.

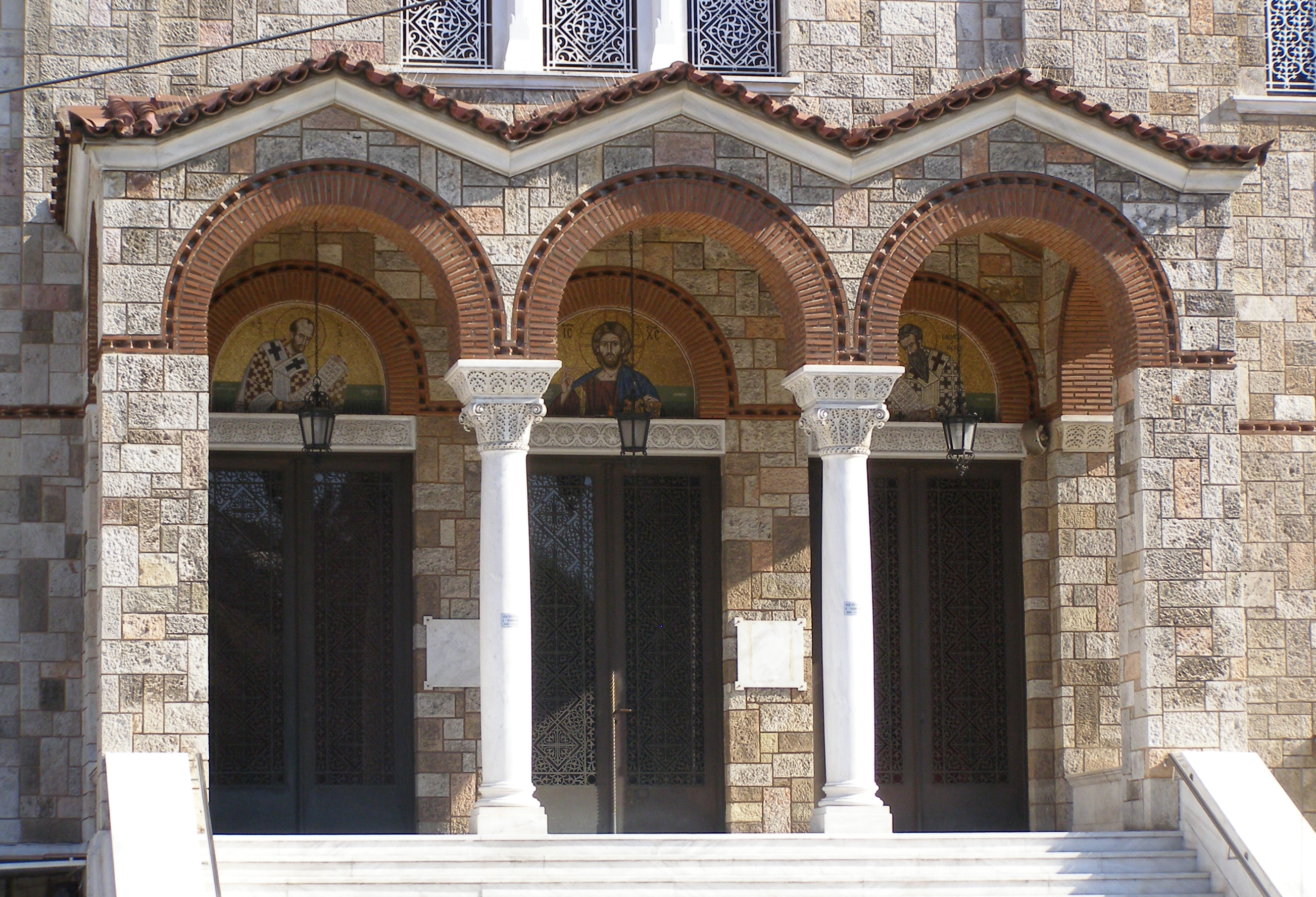
Portico.

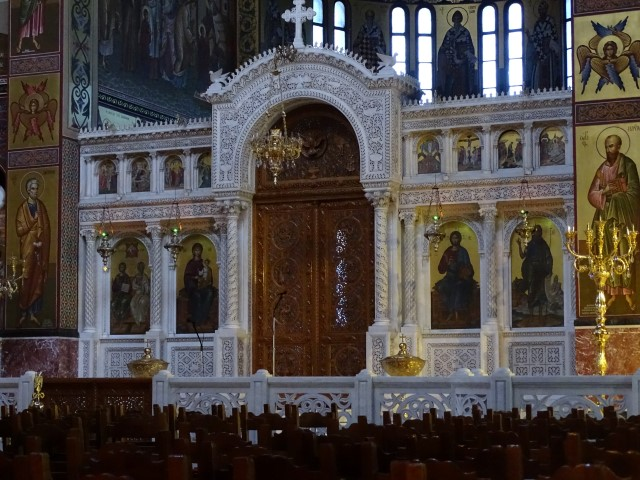
Iconostasis.

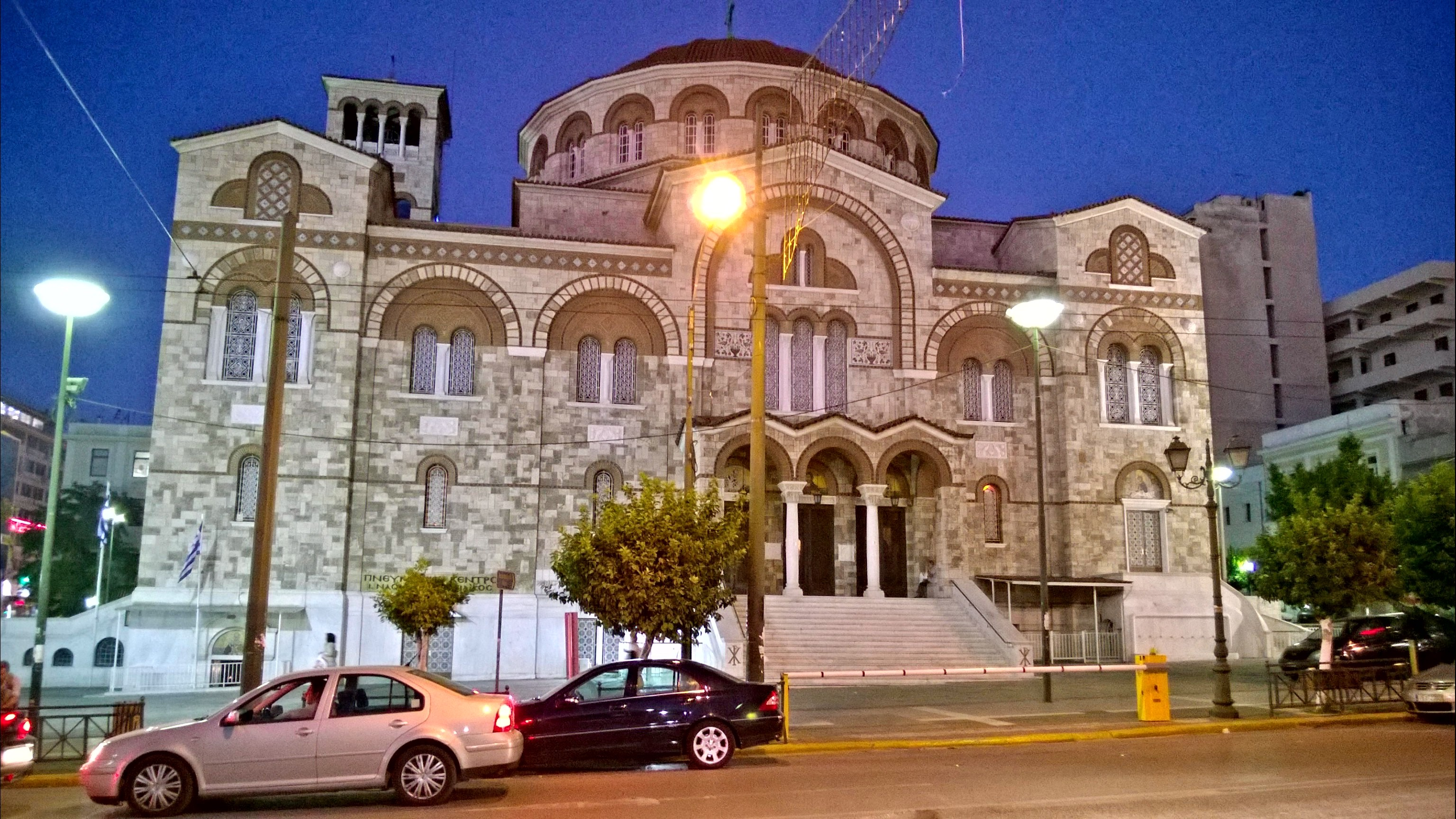
Side view.

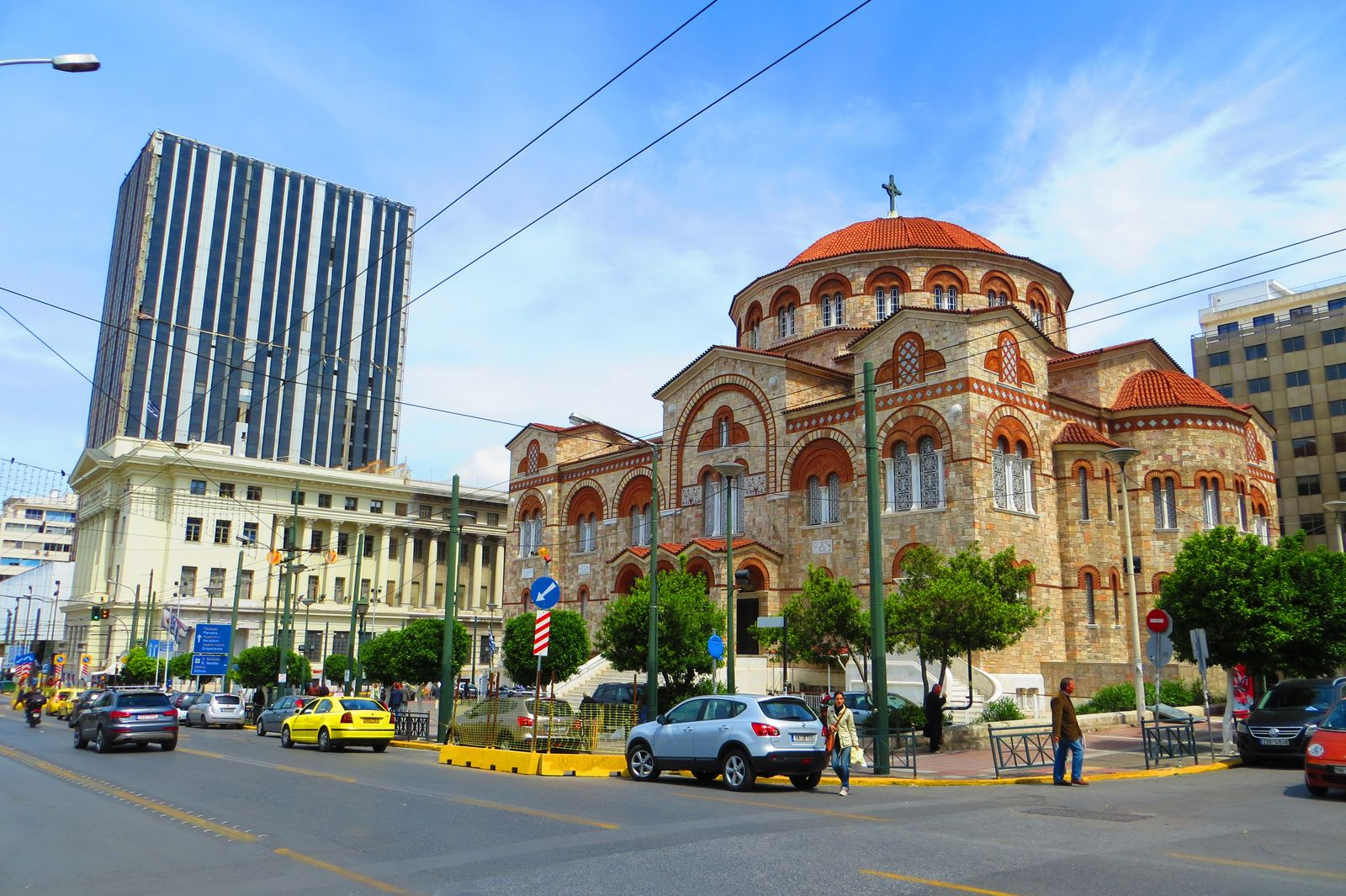
Street view.

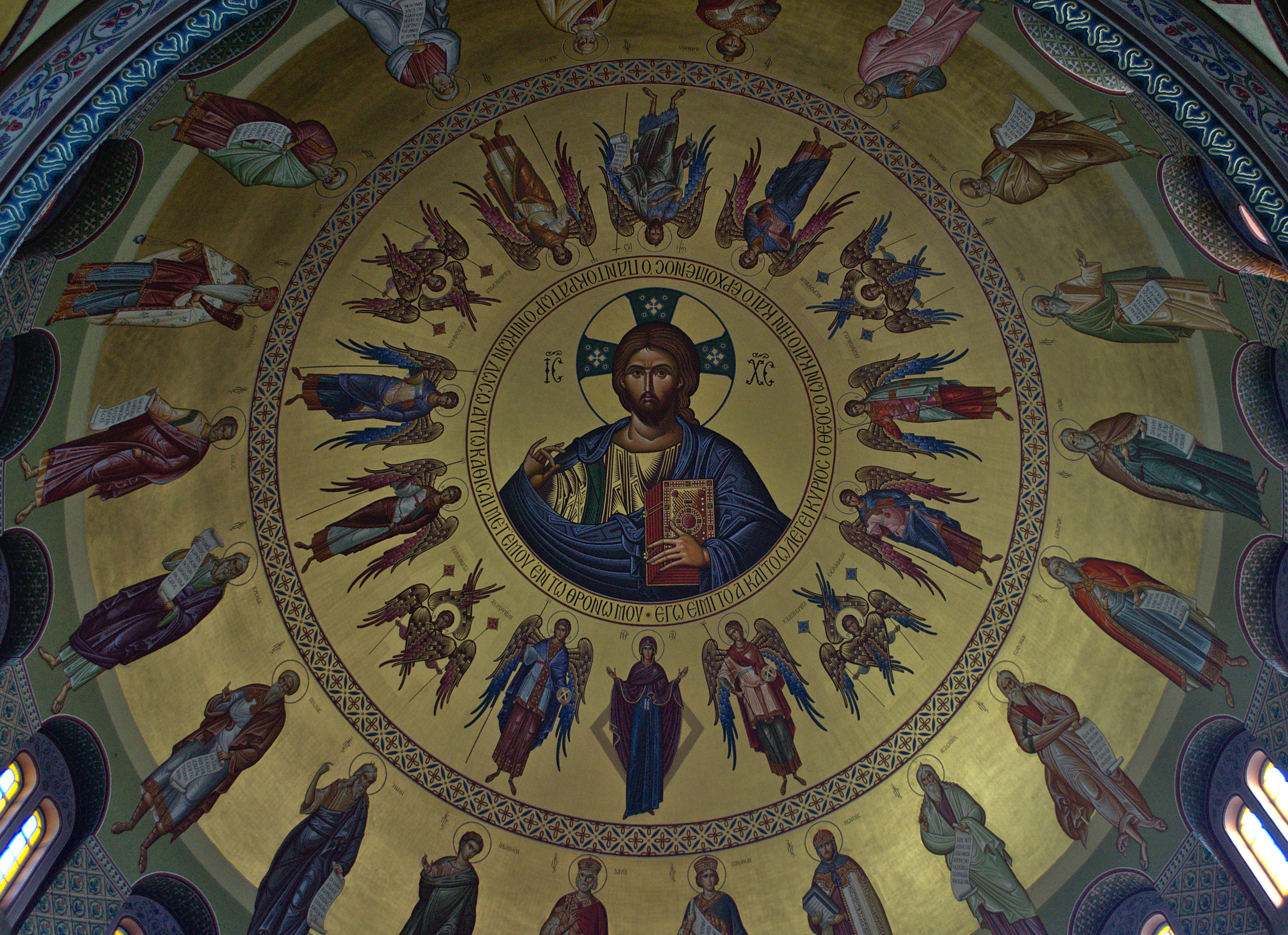
The dome.

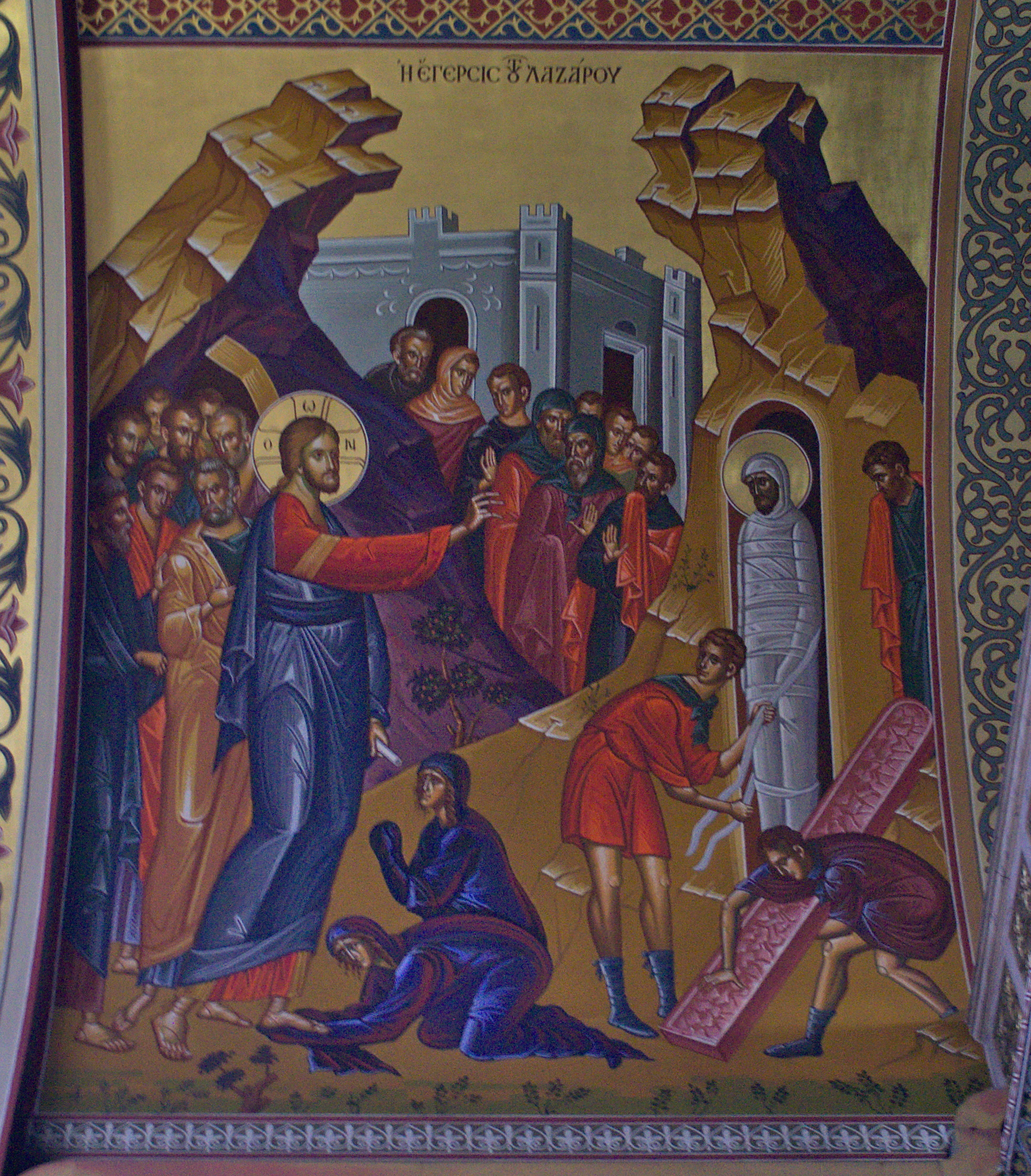
Icon of Raising of Lazarus.

== See also ==
- List of cathedrals in Greece
- Saint Irene church, Athens
- Eastern Orthodoxy in Greece
