= Pantocrator Church, Patras =

Church in Patras, Greece

Pantocrator Church
- Ιερός Ναός Παντοκράτορος
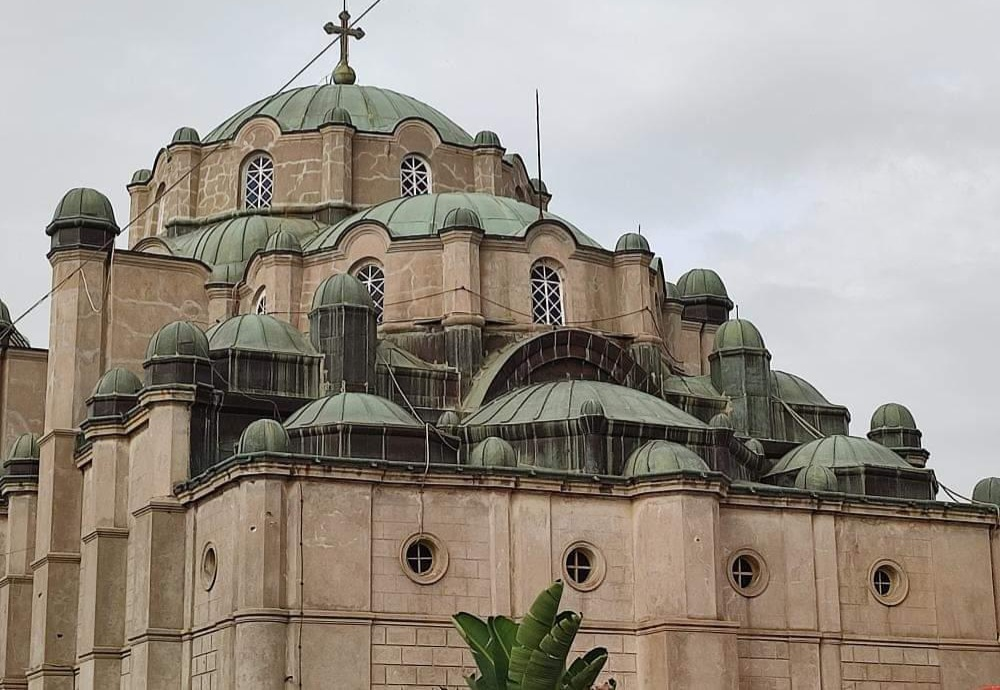

- Location within Greece
- 38°14′35.06″N 21°44′25.39″E
- Location: Patras
- Country: Greece
- Language: Greek
- Denomination: Greek Orthodox

History
- Status: Open

Architecture
- Architectural type: Byzantine
- Completed: 1840

Administration
- Metropolis: Metropolis of Patras

The Church of the Pantocrator of Patras (Greek: Ιερός Ναός Παντοκράτορος, romanized: Ieros Naos Pantokratoros) is a Greek Orthodox basilica in the east side of the city of Patras, in southwestern Greece. The current church was built in the mid nineteenth century, shortly after Greece's independence from the Ottoman Empire, and it is dedicated to Christ Pantocrator, or Christ the Ruler of All. The church is noted for its lead-covered domes and is considered to be a landmark of the upper town of Patras.

== History ==
=== The first church ===
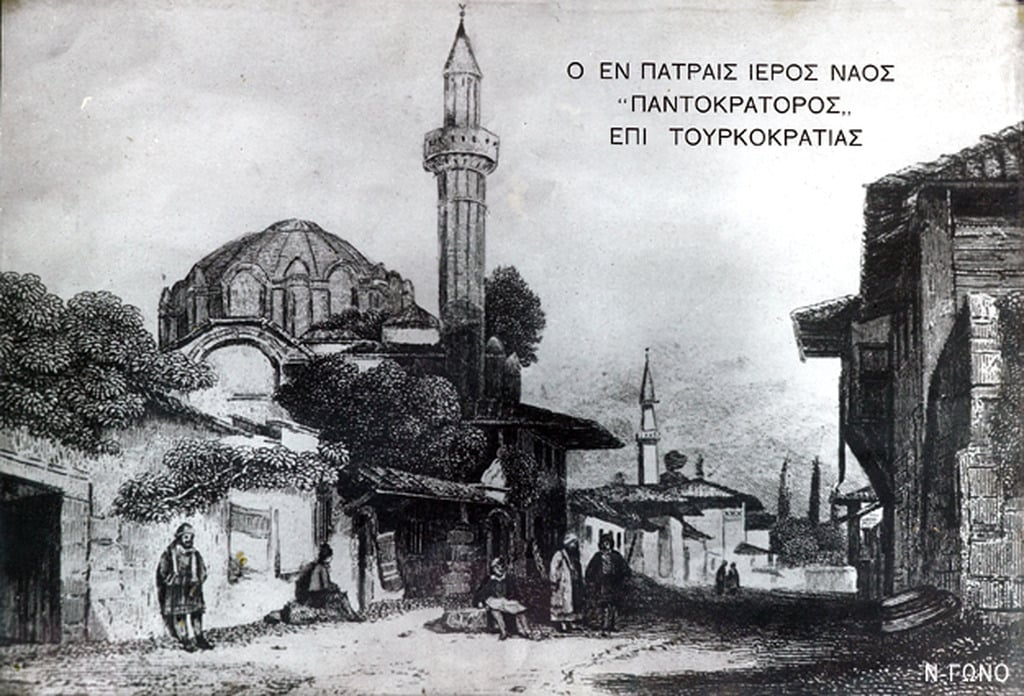
The old church converted to a mosque, engraving of the 19th century.

The site on which the current temple stands built has been sacred since ancient times, that is, long before Christ. Much of the church's history is documented by the late historian Stephanos Thomopoulos, a native of Patras. According to him, in the center of the ancient agora of Patras stood an ancient temple dedicated to Olympian Zeus, as attested in the works of Philemon, Pliny and Pausanias. However, that temple of Olympian Zeus was destroyed during the early years following the Roman Empire's Christianisation; on its ruins a new religious building was erected, a church dedicated to Christ Pantocrator around the year 900 AD.

During the Venetian rule of Patras in the fifteen century it was converted into a Catholic church and re-dedicated to Saint Mark. Much later, after Patras fell to the Ottoman Turks, it was converted into a mosque and called Kursum Mosque, meaning 'the lead-roofed mosque', due to the church's dome that was covered with lead. According to other sources, it was called the Fethiye Mosque, meaning "mosque of the conquest."

At the beginning of the Greek War of Independence in 1821, it was said that the first bullets used in Patras against the Ottomans were made with lead taken from the dome of the mosque. Seven years into the war in 1828 the mosque was put to use as a hospital for the French Army Commander-in-Chief Maison.

=== The second church ===
After Greece achieved independence from the Ottoman Empire, the original church/mosque building was demolished and the current, larger church was built. The erection of the current Pantocrator church as it is today, is calculated (based on existing data) to have taken place around the years 1835–1840, during the early years of Greece's independence. The old mosque's minaret, which once stood to the southern side of the building, was demolished.

Ever since the current church's construction was completed various additions and repairs have been made from time to time, the most noteworthy of those being the copper-covering of all the larger and the smaller domes of the roof in 1951. This was done to ensure that all the paintings and decorations of the Pantocrator's interior would be protected from the moisture. In 1864 it was renovated by the Epirote architect Georgios Psyllas, a renovation which also saw smaller domes similarly covered in copper sheets being added to the building.

One of the most imposing buildings in the city of Patras, Pantocrator Church has attracted the attention of many foreign travellers and pilgrims, who have made several references to the church in their documents, as well as many depictions of it in engravings and drawings of the 19th century. The church of Pantocrator is considered to be a special religious monument for Patras with great aesthetic, religious and historical value.

== Architecture ==
The first church building from the tenth century was a smaller one, built according to the of design trends the era. After its conversion into a mosque, a thin, pencil-like minaret was added to the south corner of the former church.

This Byzantine-inspired church is a three-aisled basilica covered with domes, with the central, larger dome resting on four spherical triangles, while in the east and west there is a quadrisphere for bearing loads. It was built to some extent to mimic the design of the Hagia Sophia in the imperial capital Constantinople (now Istanbul), with the external vaults facing north and south, which are rare to find in many Orthodox churches in Greece.

== Gallery ==
Pantocrator Church of Patras

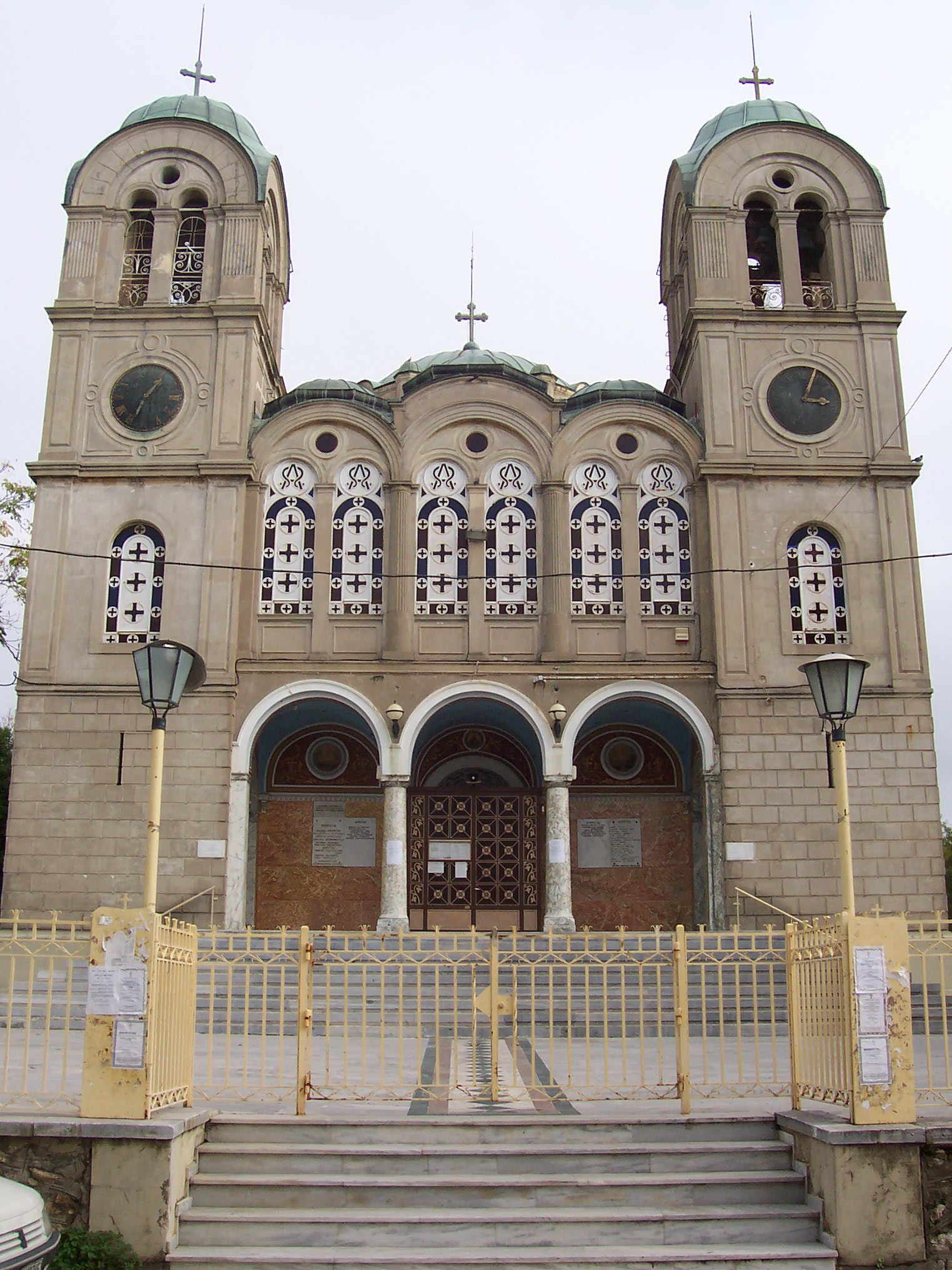
The church's façade with the portico on the northwestern side.

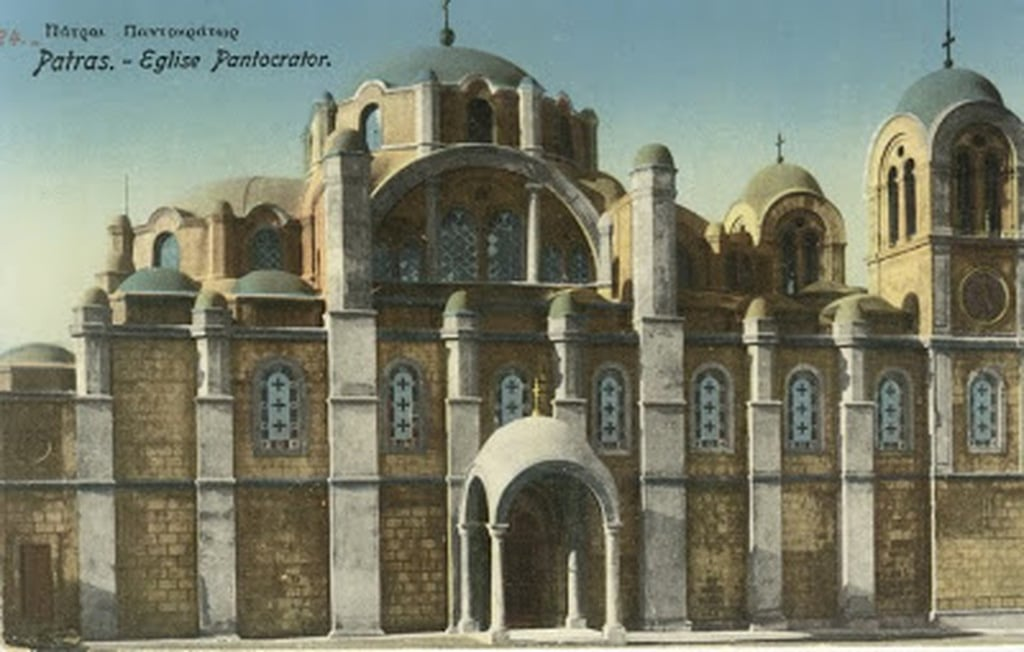
Souvenir from Patras with Pantocrator Church.

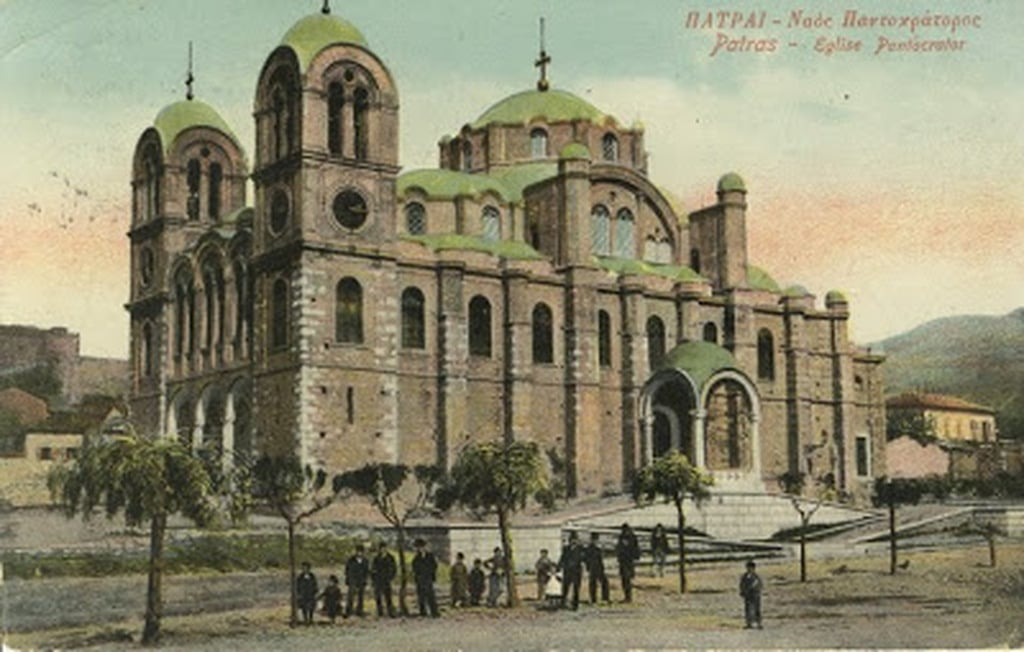
The church on an old postcard.

The church's domes.

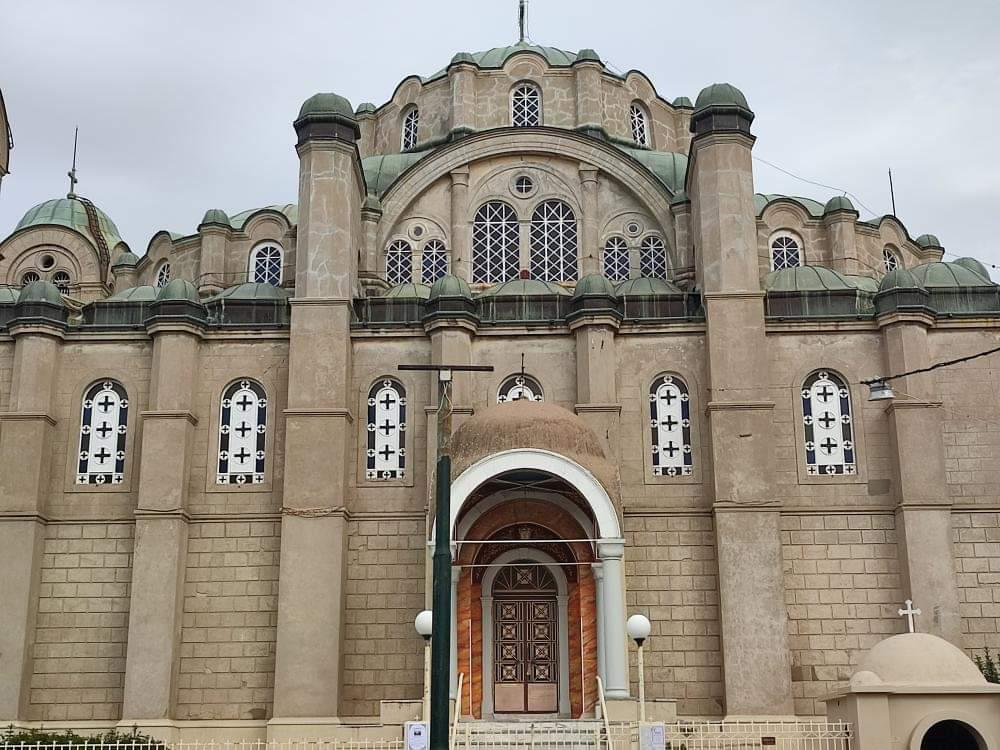
View from the south.

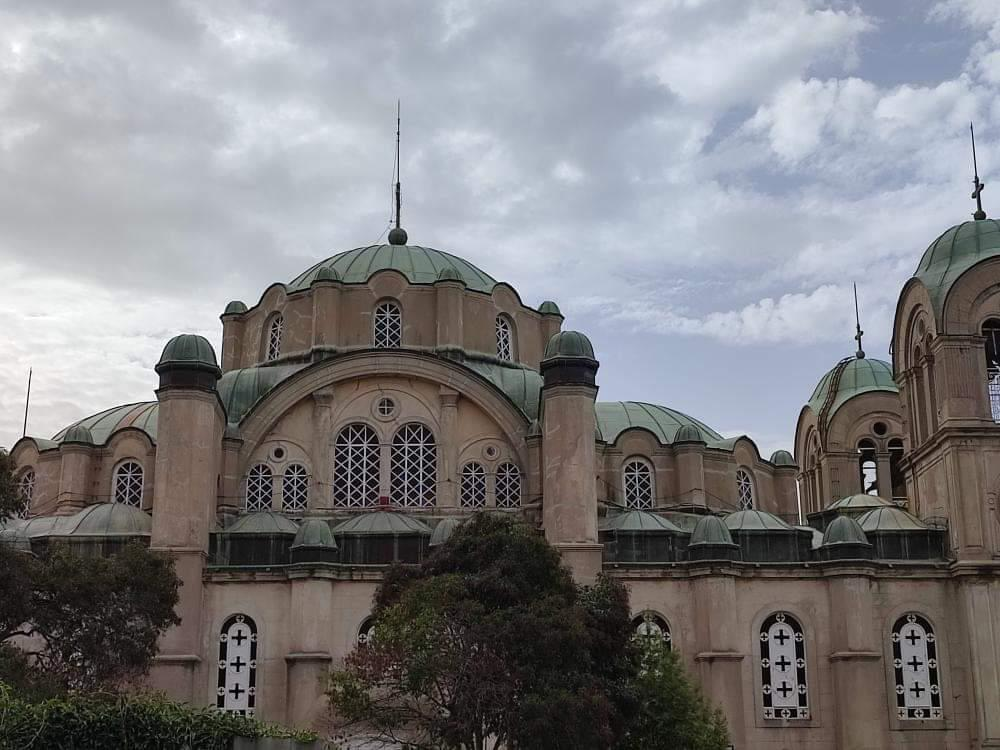
Church's exterior.

== See also ==
- List of cathedrals in Greece
- Saint Irene church, Athens
- Eastern Orthodoxy in Greece
