= Pantokrator =

Pantokrator may refer to:

- Christ Pantocrator, a specific depiction of Christ in Christian iconography
- Mount Pantokrator, Corfu, Greece
- Pantokratoros monastery, Greece
- Pantocrator Church, Patras, Greece
- Pantokrator (band), a Christian metal band from Sweden
- Pantokrator, former church Zeyrek Mosque, Turkey
