= Saint Irene church, Athens =

Basilica church in Athens, Greece

Church of Saint Irene Hagia Irene
- Αγία Ειρήνη
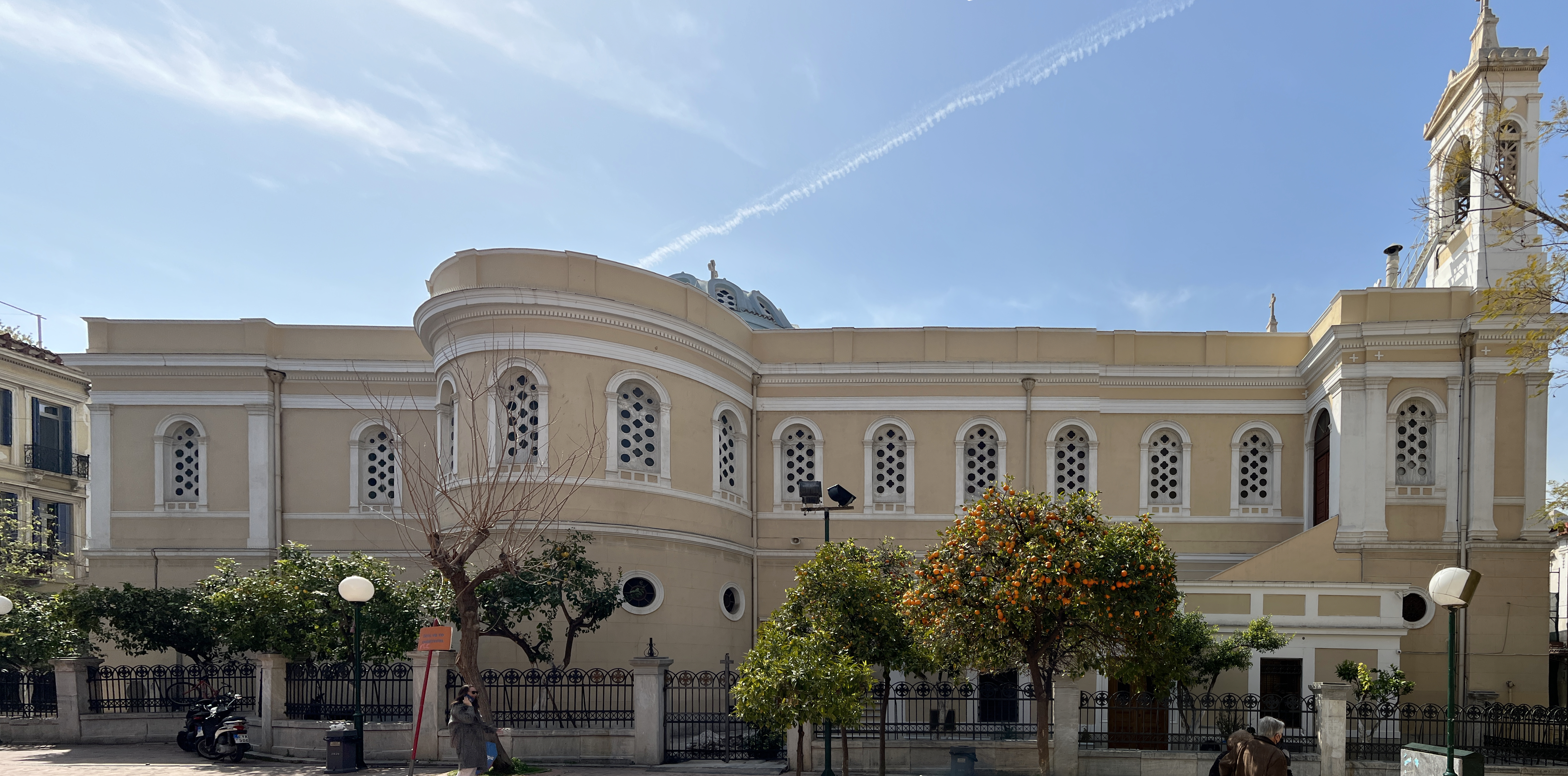
- Side view

- Hagia Irene in Athens

Religion
- Affiliation: Greek Orthodox
- District: Church of Greece

Location
- Location: Athens, Greece
- Coordinates: 37°58′37.5″N 23°43′41.0″E

Architecture
- Type: Church
- Completed: 1850

Specifications
- Dome: 1
- Materials: Brick, stone

The Church of Saint Irene (Greek: Ιερός Ναός Αγίας Ειρήνης, romanized: Ierós Naós Agías Irínis, lit. 'Sacred Temple of Saint Irene' Greek pronunciation: [aˈʝia iˈrini]), also known as Hagia Irene or Hagia Eirene, is an Eastern Orthodox church in the city of Athens, Greece, built on the site of an older medieval church, located on Aiolou Street. It is dedicated to Saint Irene, and served as the metropolis of the new Greek state during the early years of independence in the 19th century. Saint Irene is venerated on May 5.

== History ==
=== Medieval church ===
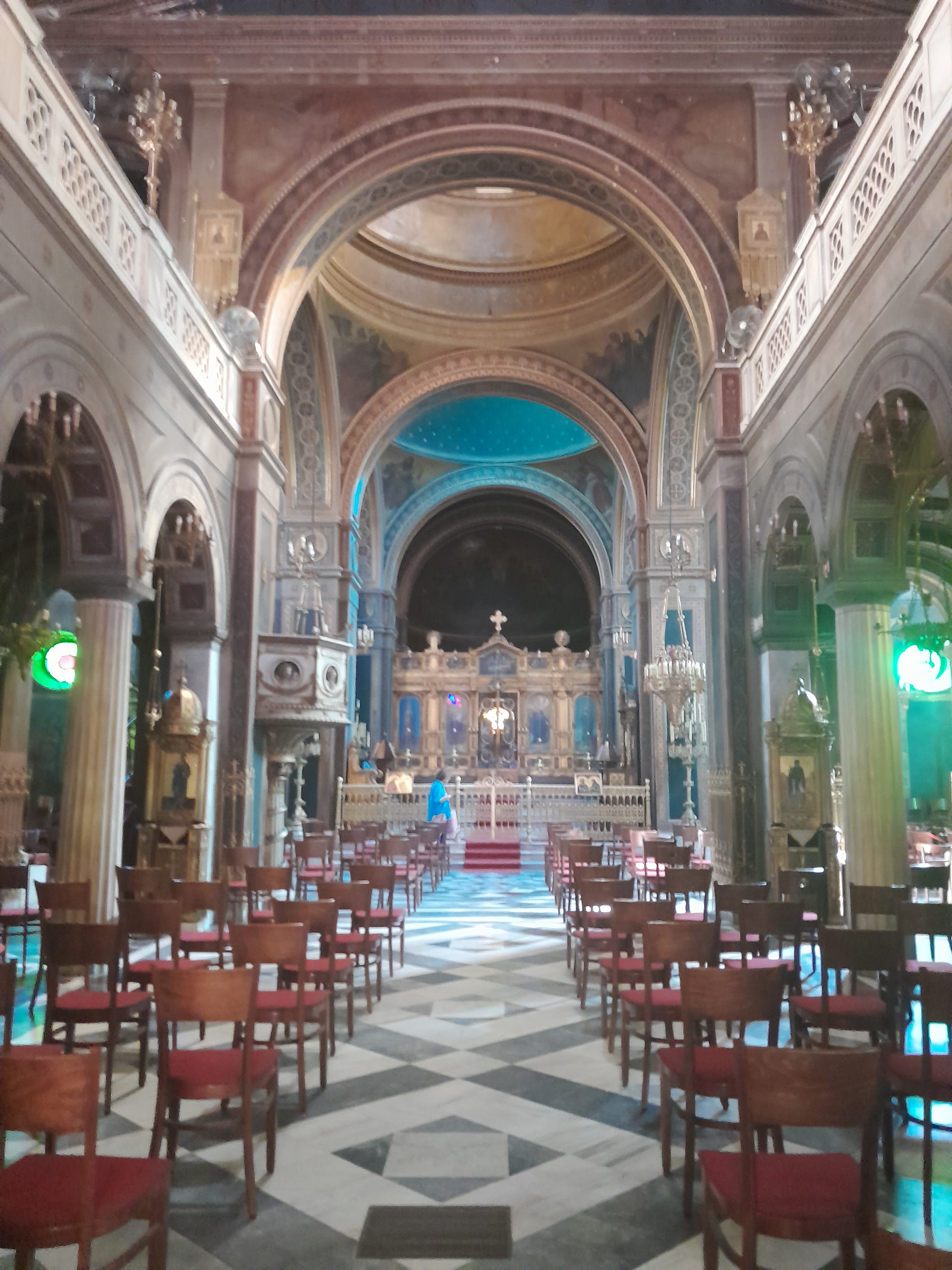
Interior of Hagia Irene

On the site of the modern church there used to be a small Byzantine-era church, which at the beginning of the 18th century was part of the Penteli Monastery. During the period of Ottoman rule in Athens, that old church played an important role as the main gathering place for the Greek Christians of the town, and during the Greek War of Independence of 1821–1829, it suffered serious damage. The medieval church was burned to the ground, with only the façade surviving the fire. When the seat of the newly independent Greek kingdom was transferred from Nafplio to Athens in 1832, Hagia Irene became the official cathedral of the new capital.

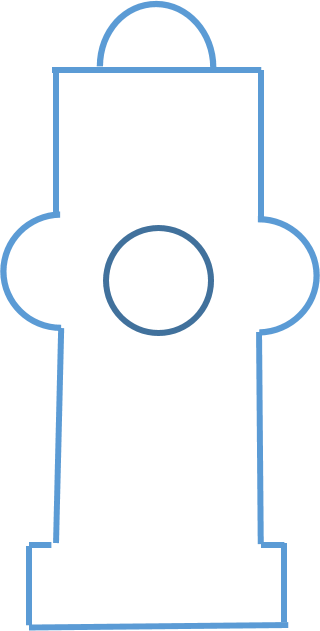
Top outline of the church.

Repair work began in the year 1835, whereupon Hagia Irene began to function as the metropolitan church of Athens until the construction of the present Metropolitan Cathedral in the city. The older church is associated with important moments in the modern history of Athens and its institutions. The election of the mayor of Athens took place in this church; King Otto's coming-of-age celebration was commemorated in May 1835. King Otto did not wear his crown or hold a scepter at the ceremony because the ship that was supposed to bring the items to Athens was delayed at sea and thus did not arrive in time.

=== Reconstruction and new church ===
In order to meet the growing demands of the new capital, the architect Lysandros Kaftanzoglou was entrusted with its reconstruction. Work began in 1846, and the inauguration of the temple took place in 1850, while its interior decoration was completed later, between the years 1879–1892. The illustration was done by the iconographer Spyridon Hatzigiannopoulos, the greatest representative of Greek church painting of the second half of the 19th century; in fact, Hagia Irene is considered to be his most important work.

The church continued to be used as a metropolitan until 1862, and during this time it was associated with important events of recent history. Here was held the celebration of the first national anniversary in 1838, the funeral of a prominent leader of the Greek revolution, Theodoros Kolokotronis, in 1843, and the doxology for the granting of the autocephaly of the Church of Greece in 1850.

The inauguration of the new church building took place in the year 1950, even though it was not yet finished, as financial reasons delayed the completion until 1892.

== Architecture ==
=== Church structure ===
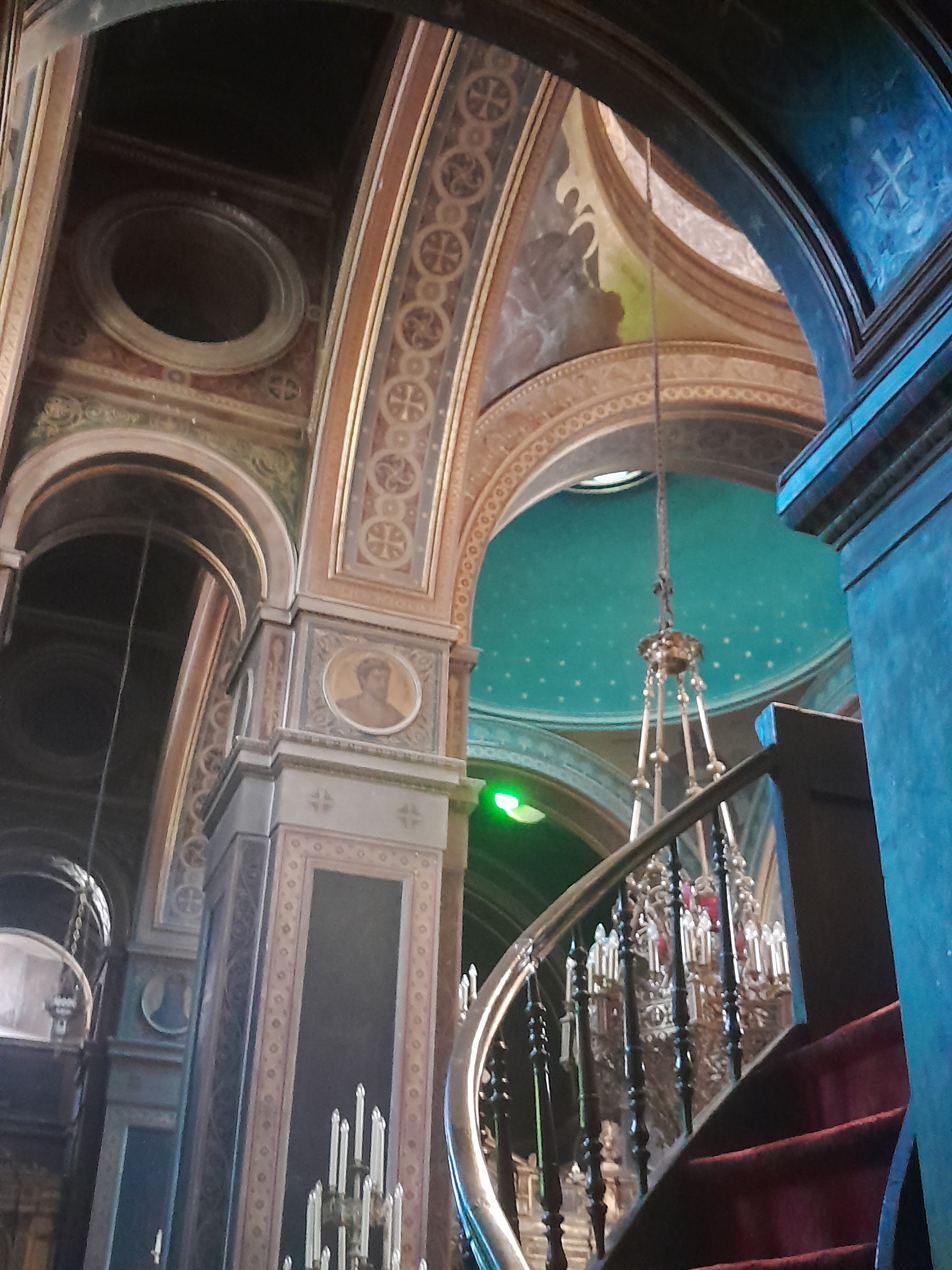
Columns inside the church

Oldest attestations claim that the church of Hagia Irene was built from the ruins of as many as seventy Byzantine churches in Athens that were demolished. It also contained material from ancient ruins from various sites of the city.

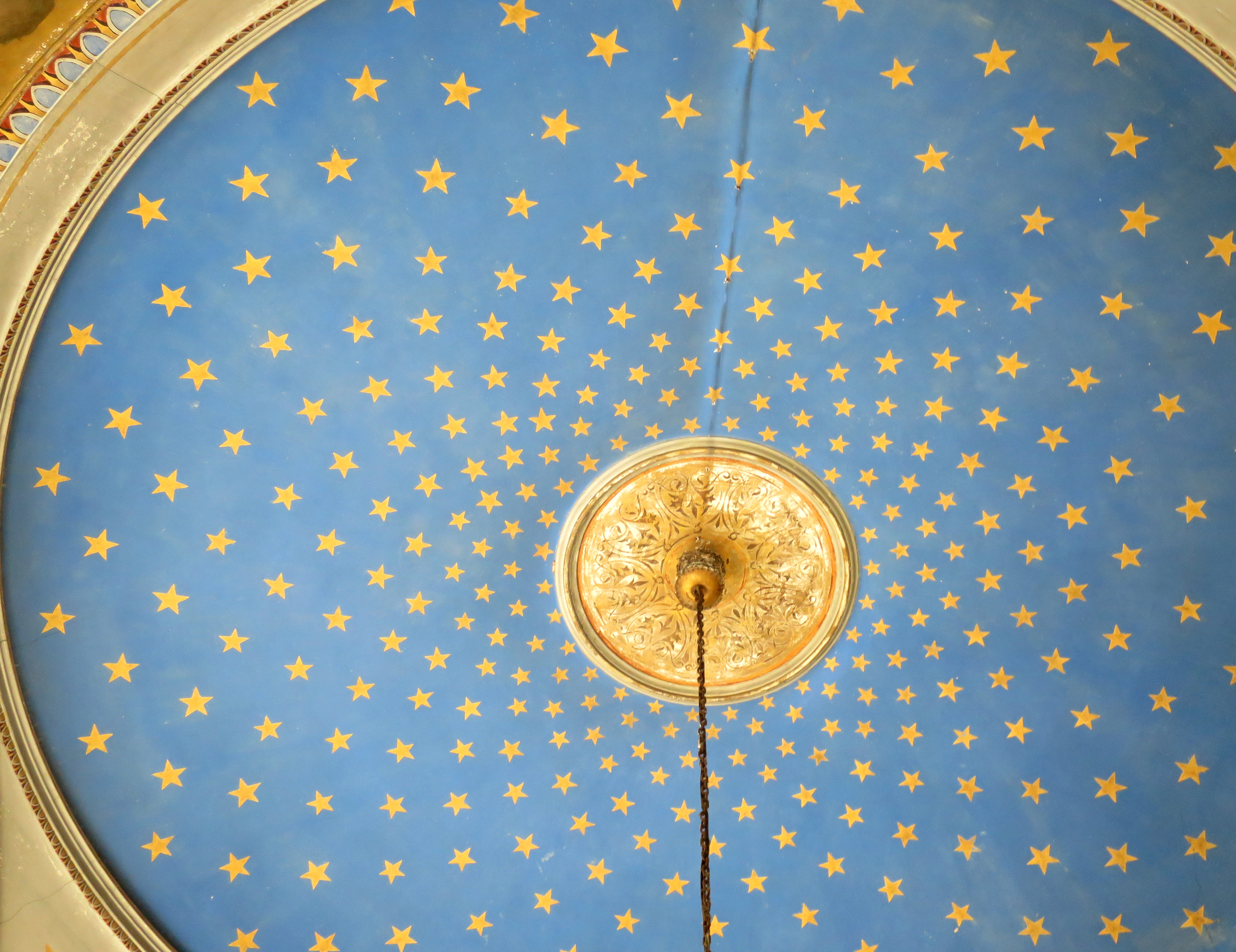
Ceiling of Hagia Irene

The church is a long three-aisled basilica with a dome and two bell towers of the neoclassical style, an original composition that combines Renaissance and Byzantine characteristics. A prominent feature are its two side double naves before the gated altar. On the right nave there is a mural depicting the teaching of the Apostle Paul on the Areopagus, an important work by Spyridon Hatzigiannopoulos, while the mural on the left nave of the transversal aisle, depicts the teachings of Jesus in Jerusalem by Ath. G. Vassiliou. The basilica has a wooden roof, a columned narthex and a dome modeled after the monasteries of Mount Athos. Even though it was not considered grand enough to be the cathedral of Athens, it remains an important work of Byzantine-influenced architecture.

Kaftanzoglou, who designed the church according to the so-called "monastery style" while also introducing the neoclassical style in church architecture, combined elements of ancient Greek and Romanesque style, along with Byzantine influence. The decorated panels on the ceiling are considered to be his best work; the state declared Hagia Irene a protected monument in 1972 on account of them. Those panels are preserved to this day. As for the hagiographies and jewel paintings of the church, they are the works by the students of the Nazarite school, the Phytalis brothers.

The church's illustrations are limited thematically wise, with few figures of saints, while on several walls are written passages from the Bible. Its impressive gilded iconostasis was a gift from Nicholas of Russia in 1850. The icon painting was undertaken by the painter Spyridon Hatzigiannopoulos, and the entire decoration was done by the jewelers V. Kottas and A. Pettas (1879-1892).

It contains two bell towers.

=== Cross ===
On July 19, 2019, the cross of the dome was bent and then completely severed, following the Magoula earthquake in 2019, resulting in its collapse and destruction.

== Gallery ==
Hagia Irene of Athens

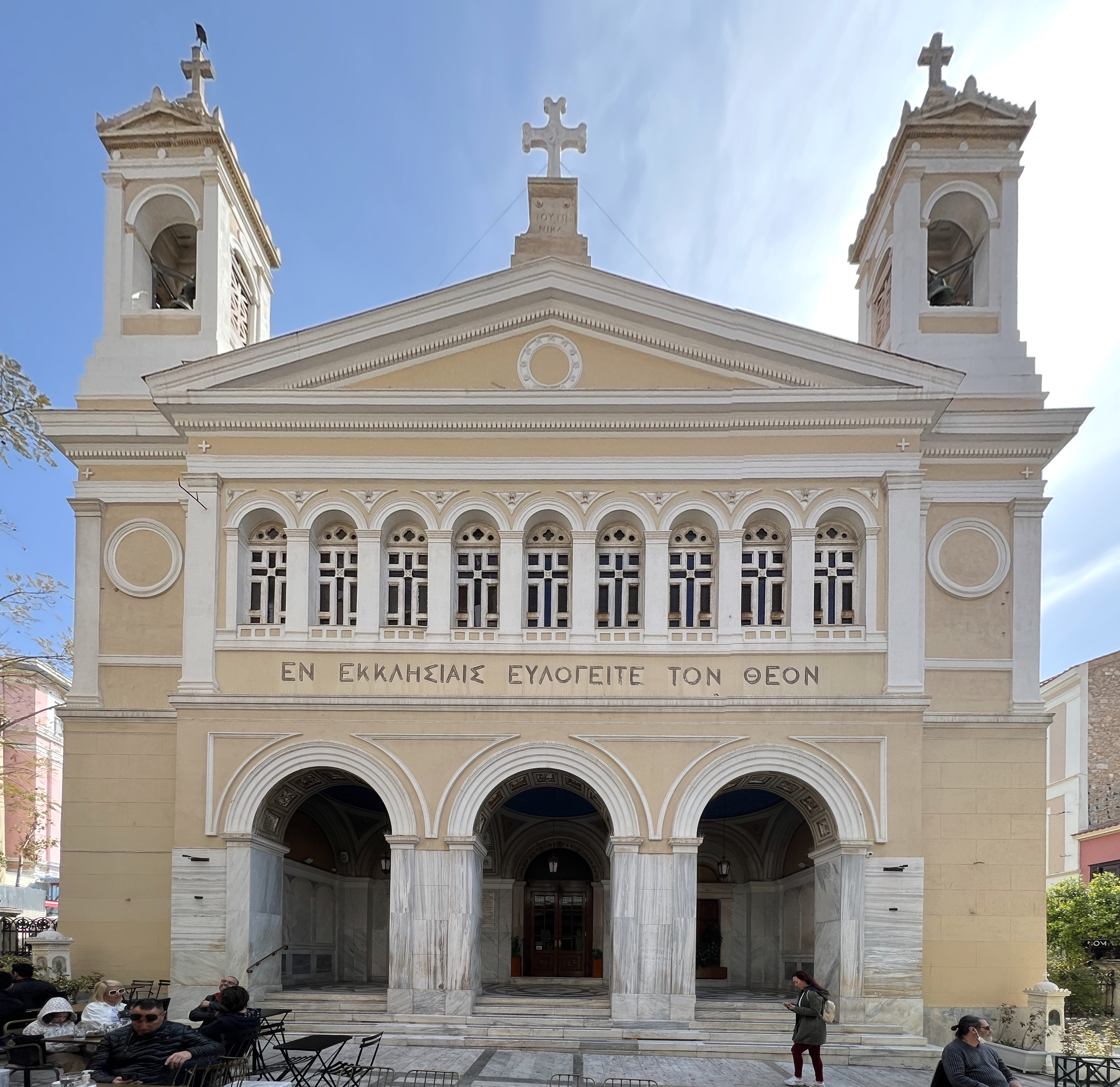
Front view

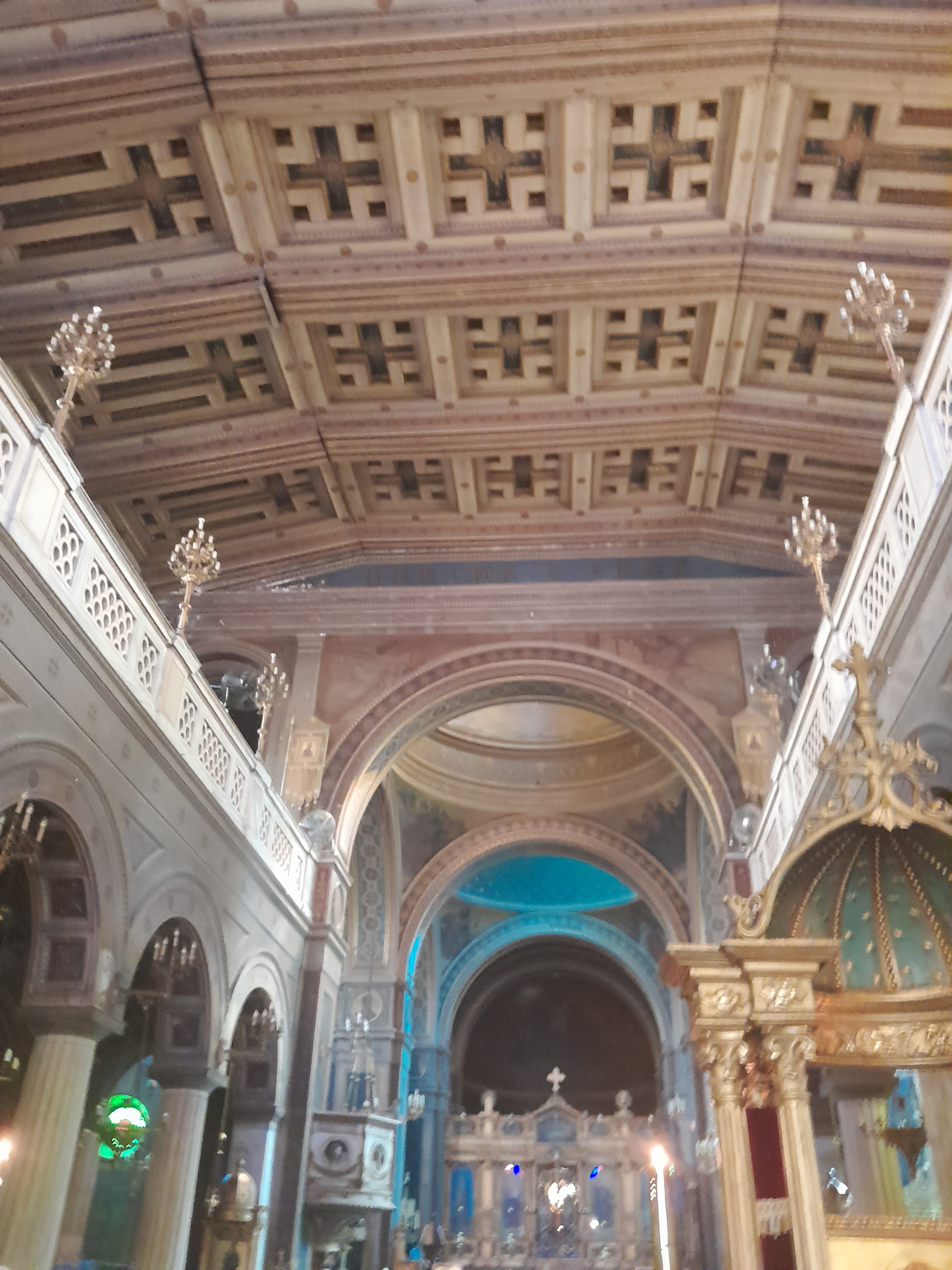
Interior and roof

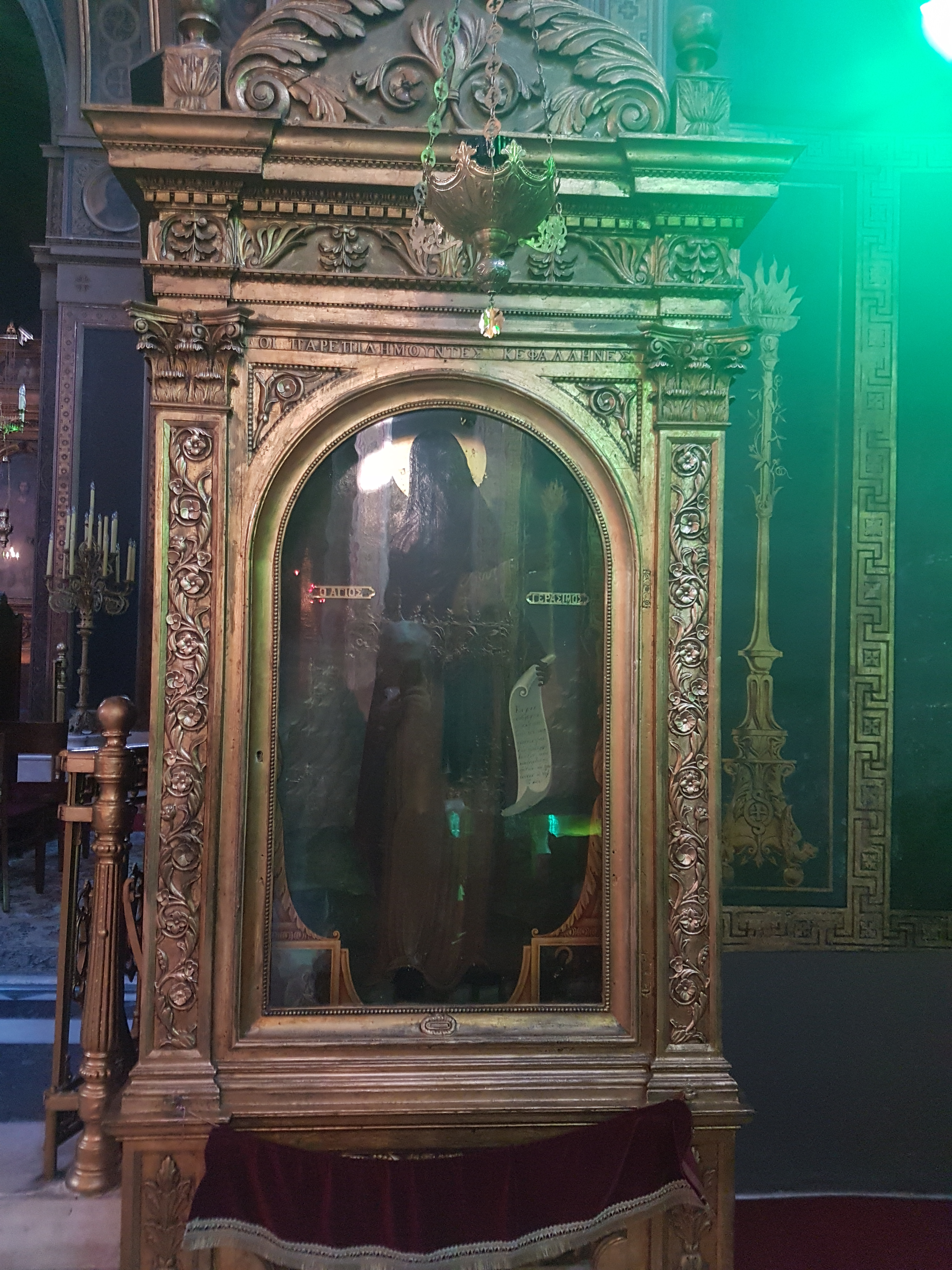
Icons

Arch

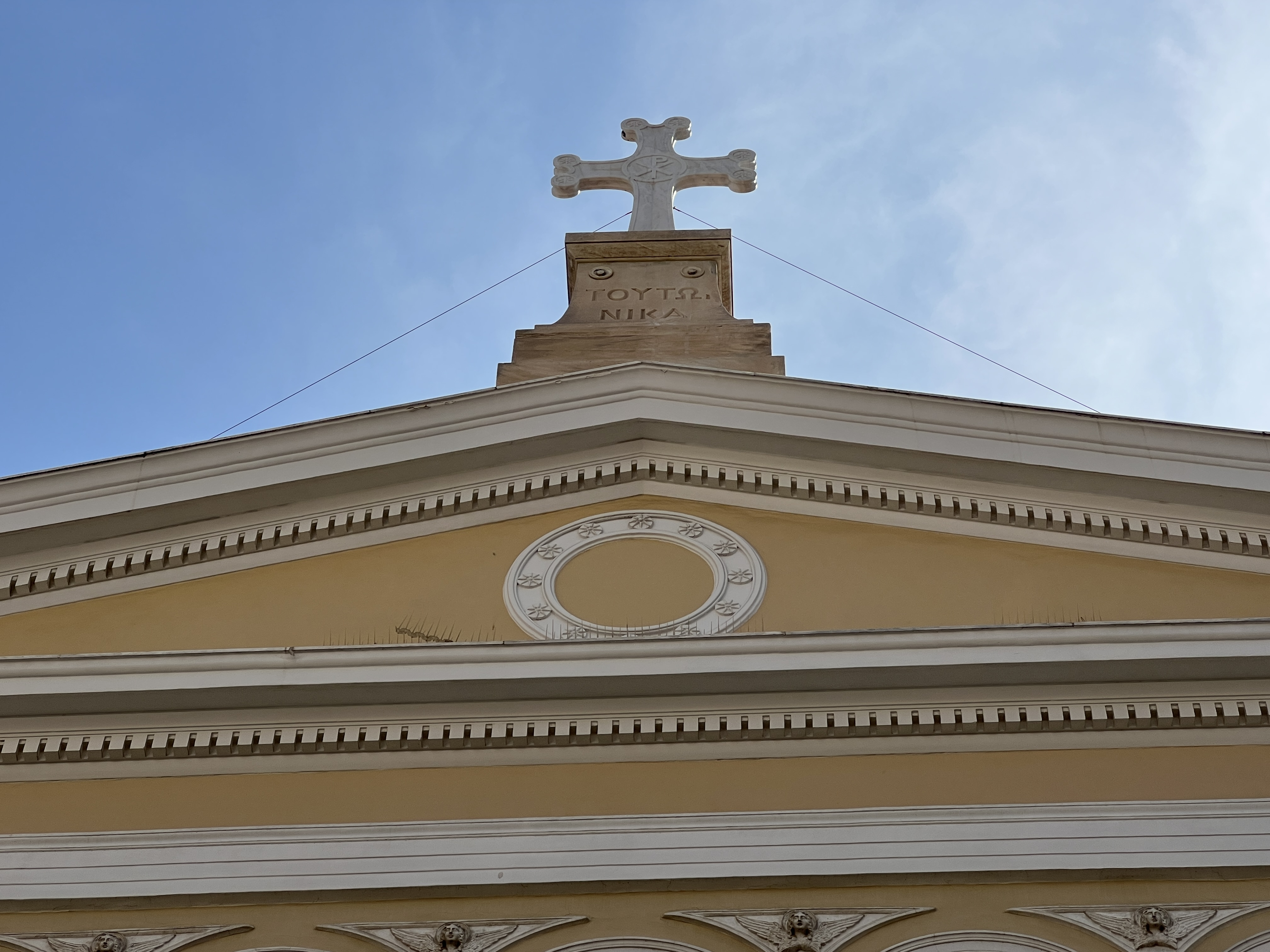
The cross

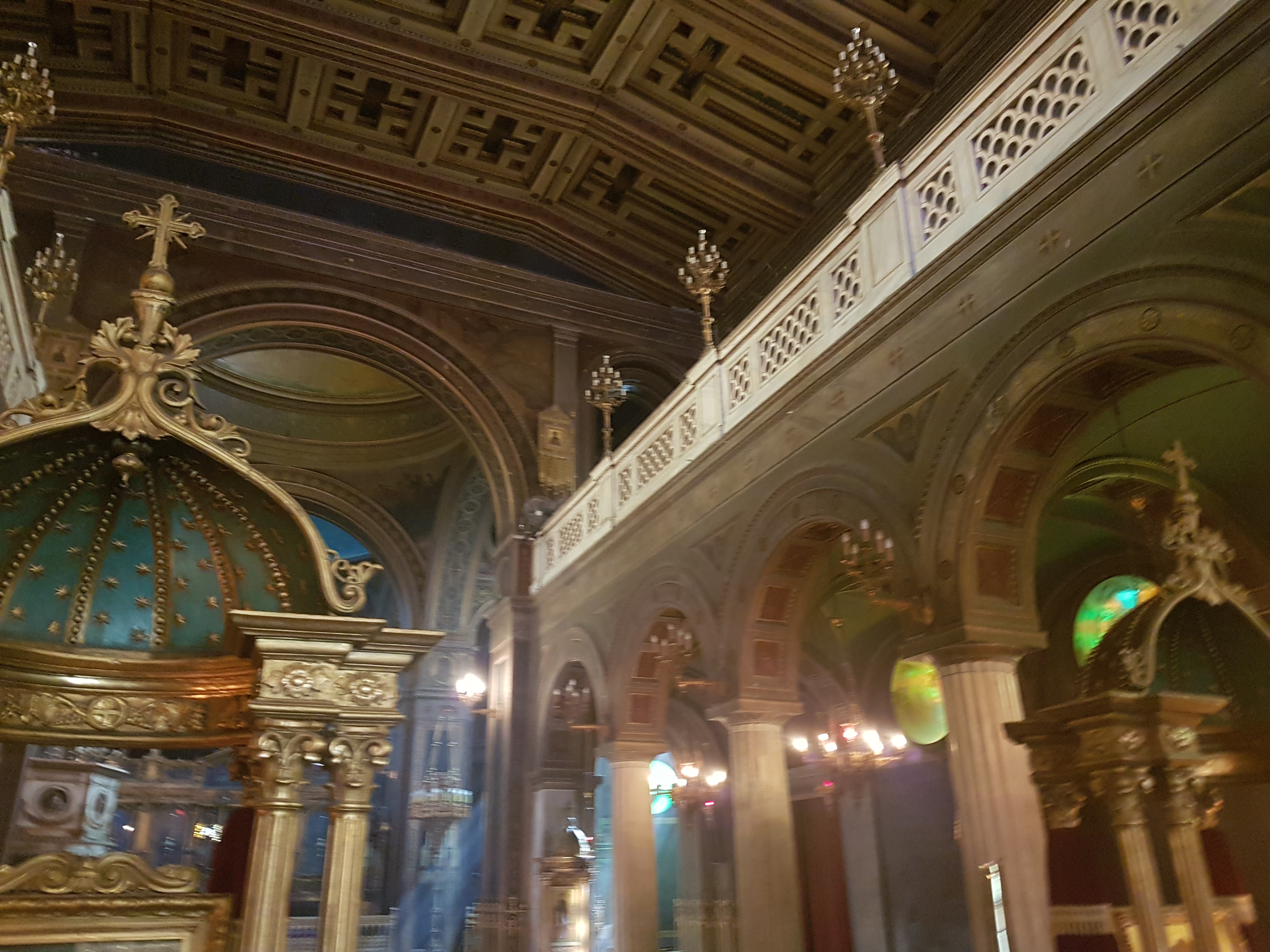
Interior

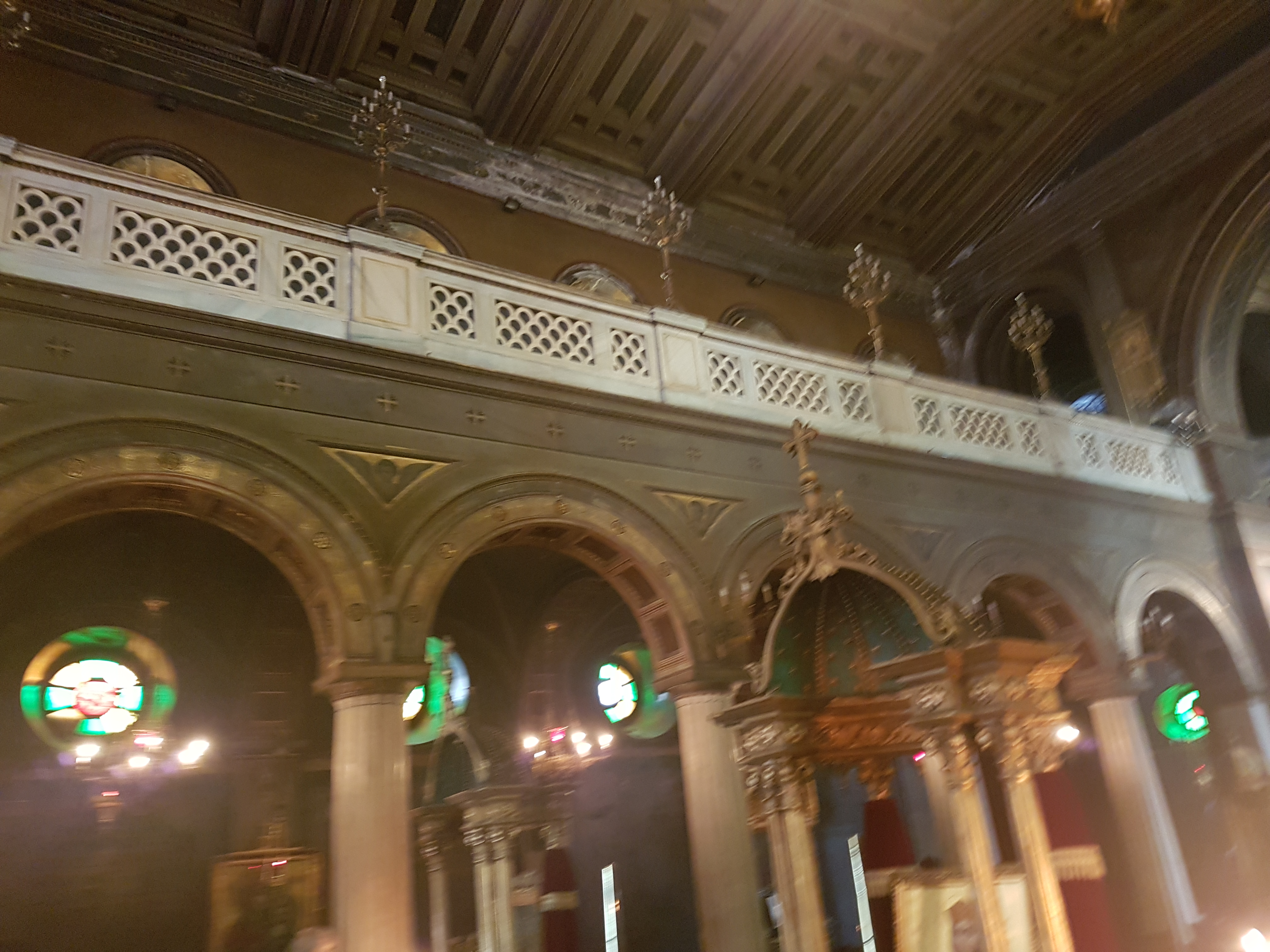
Interior

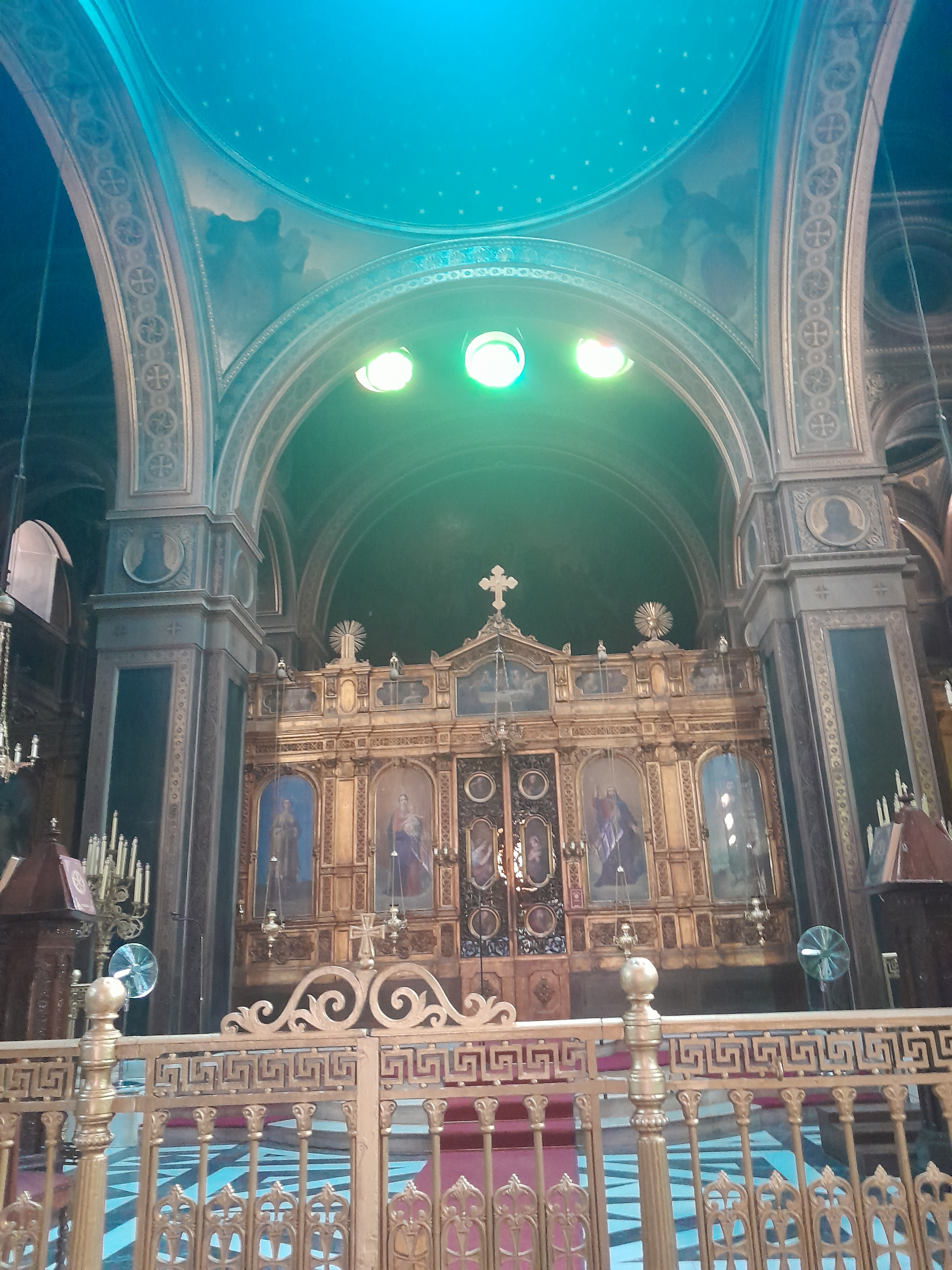
The iconostasis

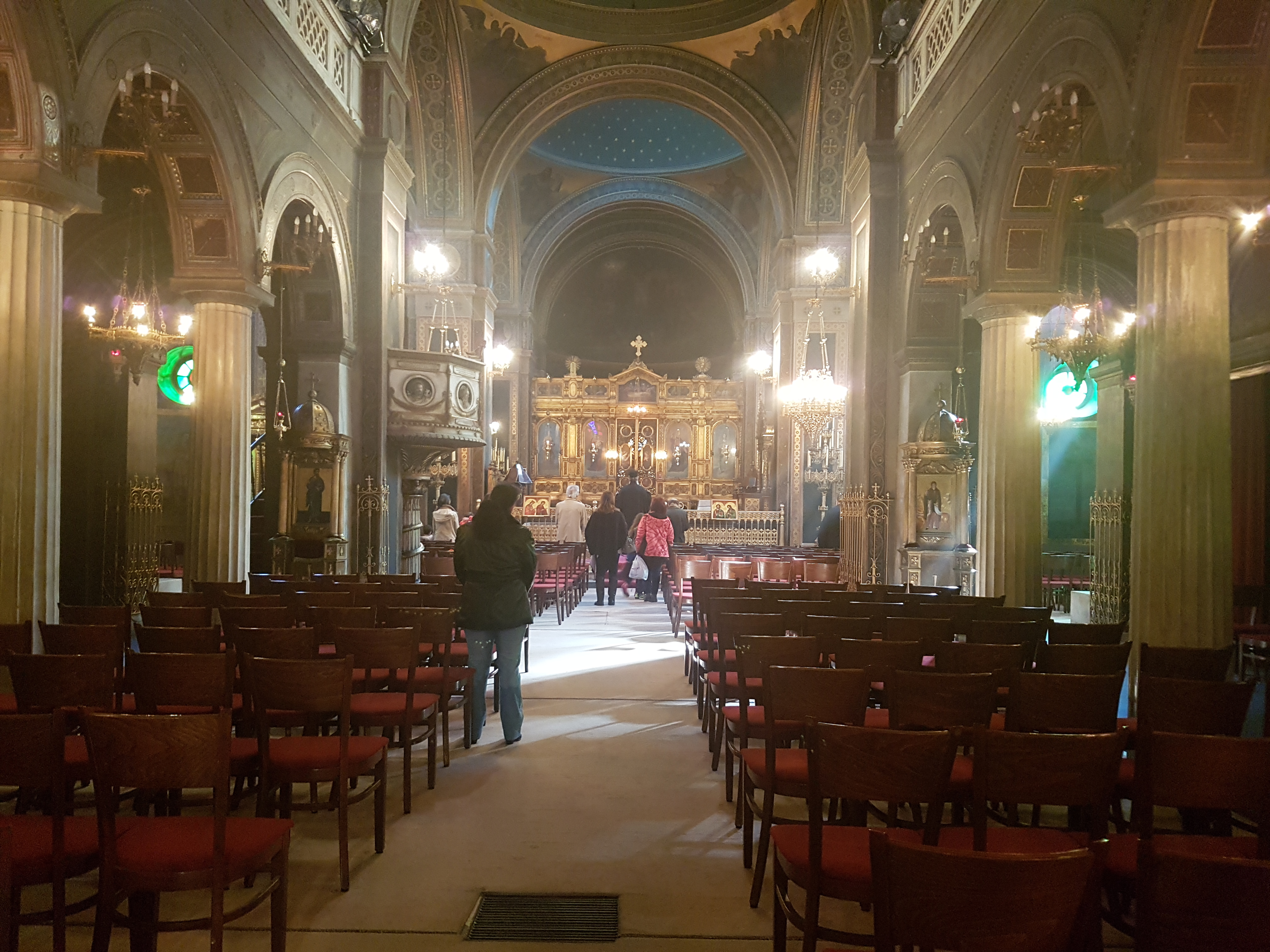
Interior

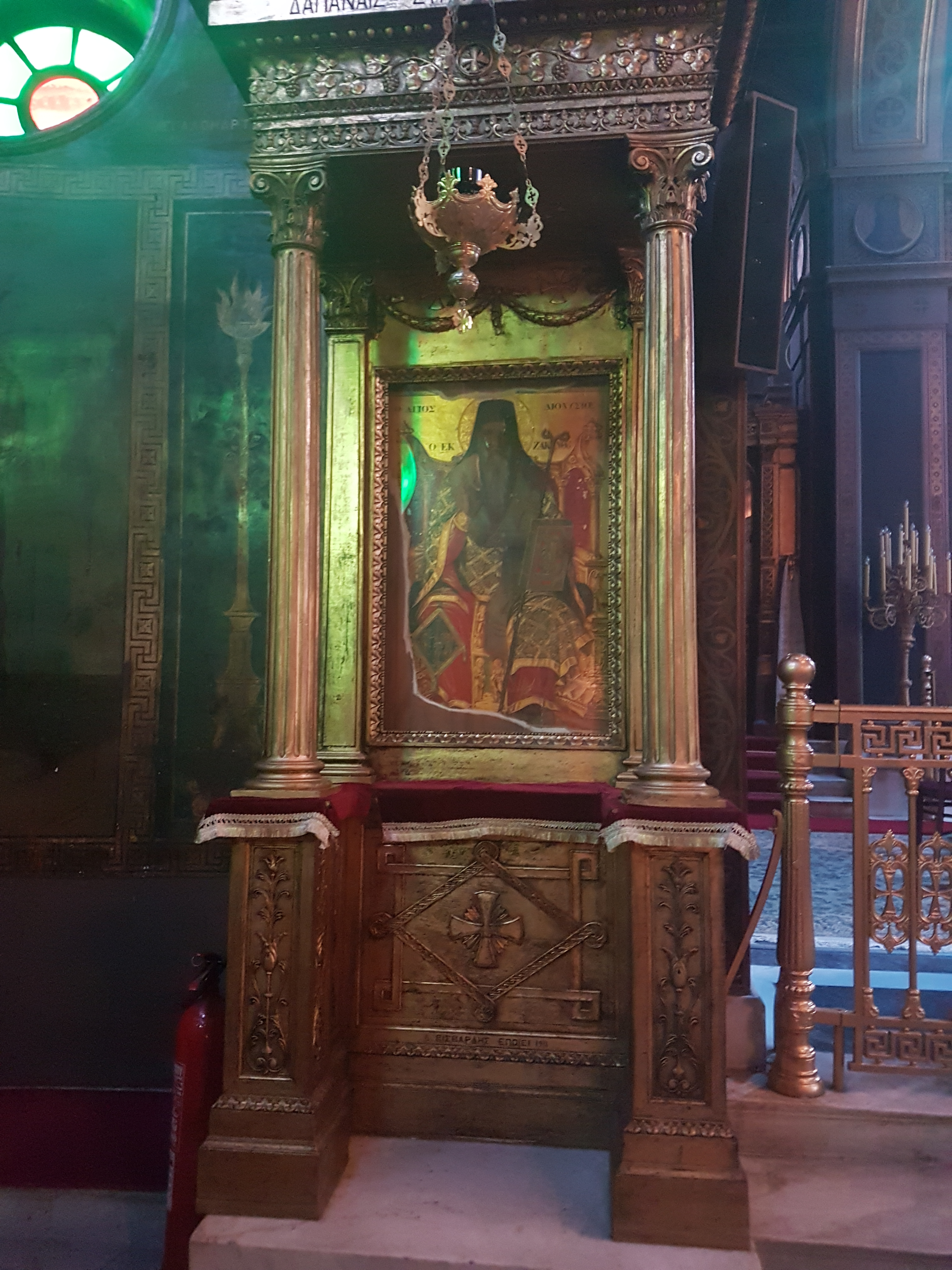
Icon

== See also ==
- List of cathedrals in Greece
- Ancient Roman and Byzantine domes
- Neoclassical architecture
- Hagia Triada Cathedral, Piraeus

== Bibliography ==
- Graikos, Nikolaos (2003). Η "βελτιωμένη" βυζαντινή ζωγραφική στο 19ο αιώνα: Η περίπτωση του Σπυρίδωνα Χατζηγιαννόπουλου (τοιχογραφικό έργο) [The 'improved' Byzantine art during the 19th century. The case of Spyridon Chatzigiannopoulos (mural work)] (in Greek). Thessaloniki, Central Macedonia: Aristotle University of Thessaloniki.
