= Presentation of the Virgin Mary Holy Metropolitan Church =

Cathedral in Chania, Crete, Greece

Presentation of the Virgin Mary Cathedral
- Presentation of the Virgin Mary Holy Metropolitan Church
- Cathedral of Chania; Trimartiri Cathedral
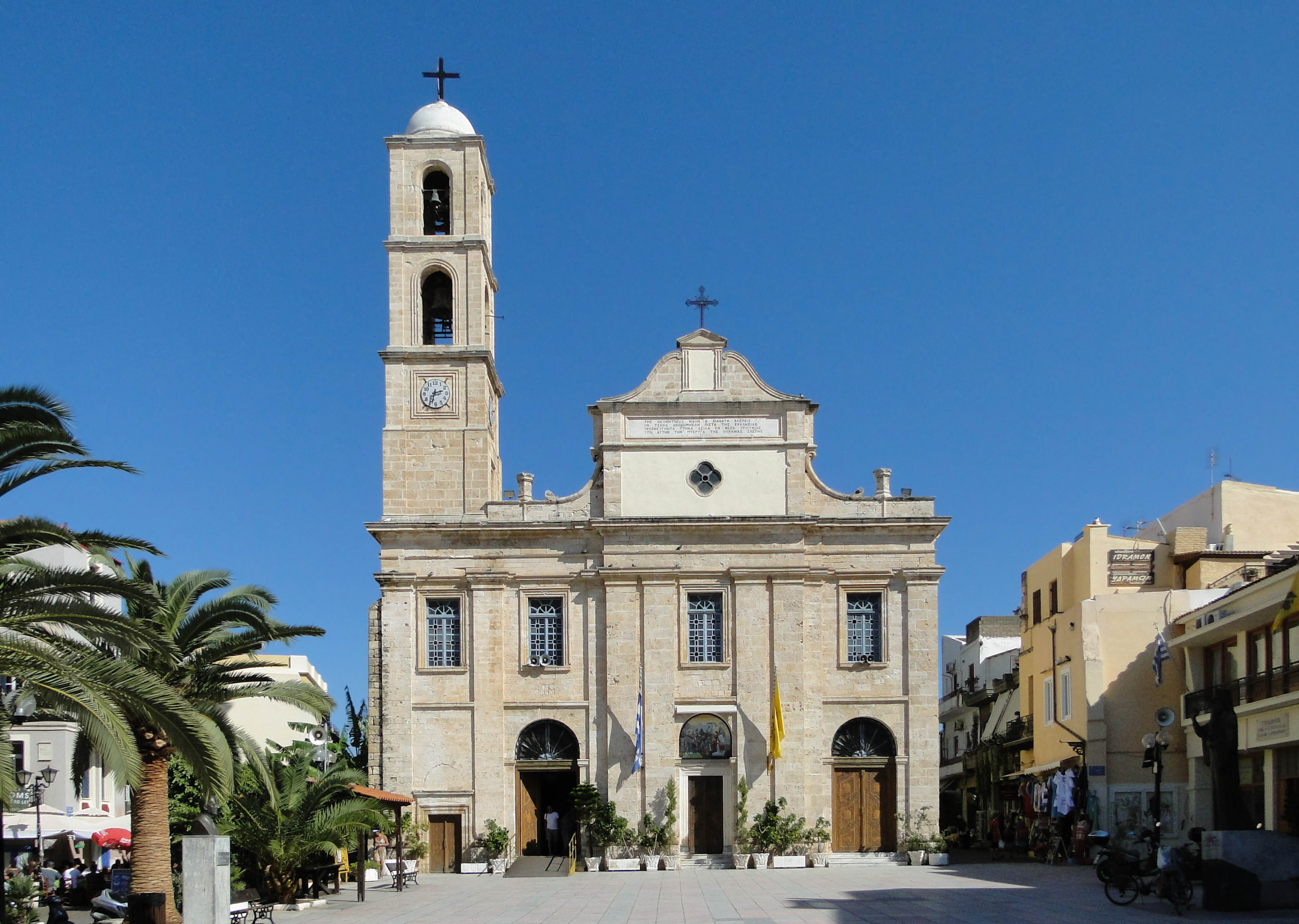

- Location of the cathedral in Crete
- Presentation of the Virgin Mary Cathedral
- 35°30′50″N 24°01′05″E
- Location: Chania, Crete
- Country: Greece
- Denomination: Greek Orthodox

History
- Status: Cathedral
- Dedication: Presentation of the Virgin
- Events: November 21

Architecture
- Functional status: Active
- Architectural type: Basilica
- Groundbreaking: 1850
- Completed: 1860

Administration
- Province: Ecumenical Patriarchate of Constantinople
- Metropolis: Kydonia and Apokoronas

Clergy
- Bishop: Sede vacante (since April 2025)

The Presentation of the Virgin Mary Holy Metropolitan Church, also known as the Cathedral of Chania and as the Trimartiri Cathedral, (Note: Other names include the Trimartyri Cathedral, the Panagia Trimartiri, the Cathedral of Mary, the Metropolitan Church of the Virgin Mary, the Cathedral Temple of Chania, and the Temple of Eisodion of Theotokos.) is a Greek Orthodox cathedral, located in Athinagora Square in the old town of Chania in Crete, Greece. It was originally built during the late period of Ottoman era, commenced in 1850 and completed in 1860.

The cathedral serves as the seat of the metropolitan bishop of Kydonia and Apokoronas, vacant since April 2025.

== History ==
According to historical accounts there was a small church on the spot from the early 11th century. The original small church was demolished by the Venetians, who built a warehouse in its place. When the Turks conquered Crete in 1695 they converted the warehouse into a soap factory, which continued operating until 1850.

The building was then donated by the Turkish authorities to the Chania Christian community, who converted it into a church, which was inaugurated by the Bishop of Kydonia in 1861. An icon salvaged from the original church, which had been housed in the Church of the Holy Unmercenaries, was transferred to the new church where it is still preserved in the narthex (or lobby area). The north aisle dedicated to Saint Nicholas replaced the Dominican church of St Nicholas in the Splantzia part of the town which the Turks had converted to a mosque. Following the building of the bishop's house, the church became the cathedral of what was then the capital of Crete.

The cathedral was damaged in the Greco-Turkish war of 1897 but restored at the expense of the Tsar of Russia, who also donated the cathedral's bell.

By royal decree in October 1947 the feast of the Presentation of the Virgin (November 21) became the official feast day of Chania. A later decree in 1956 made it a bank holiday.

== Architecture ==
The church was completed in 1860 as a three-aisled basilica with a raised nave covered by a pointed chamber. Its name as Trimartiri (or Trimartyri) is derived from its three aisles, of which the central aisle is dedicated to the Presentation of the Virgin, the south aisle to the Three Hierarchs and the north aisle to Saint Nicholas. The architectural style is influenced by the traditions formed during the Venetian period.

In the church are icons by well-known Cretan icon painters of the 19th century, such as Antonios Revelakis, Antonios Vivilakis, E. Triolitakis, and Ioannis Stais. Some in the iconostasis have silver covers made by local goldsmiths. Above the iconostasis of the central nave are frescos of SS Peter and Paul by the painter Kokotsis.

In the dome above the sanctuary is the fresco of "She who is Wider than the Heavens" depicting the Virgin Mary and painted by Nikos Giannakakis.

An epigram written in Greek on the pediment of the front wall reads "Ye who walk here see the church of the Mother of God, built by faithful children of the Church finding refuge like frightened birds in the middle of a storm under the wing of the heavenly protecting veil".

== Gallery ==
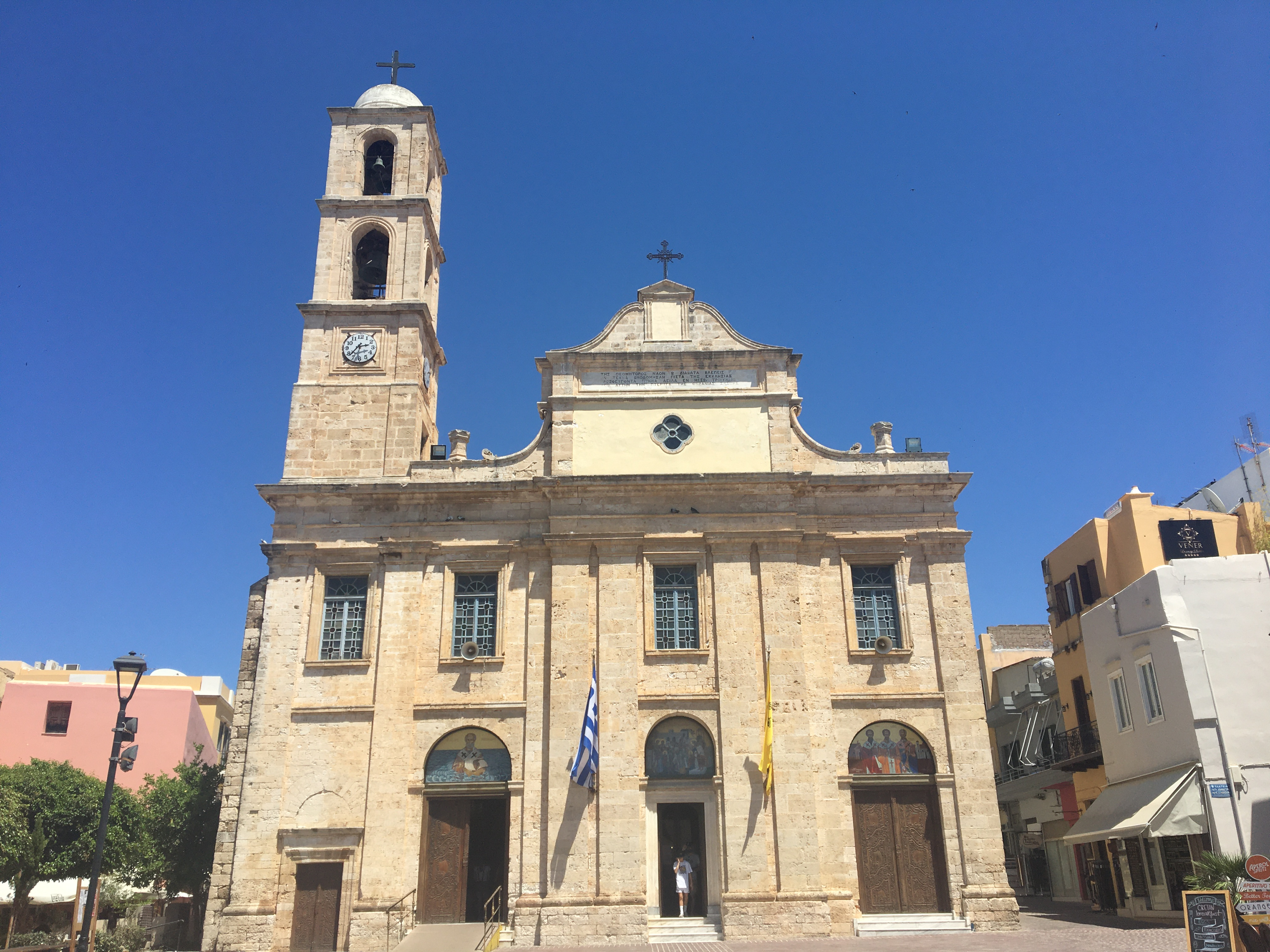
Front view of the cathedral in 2022

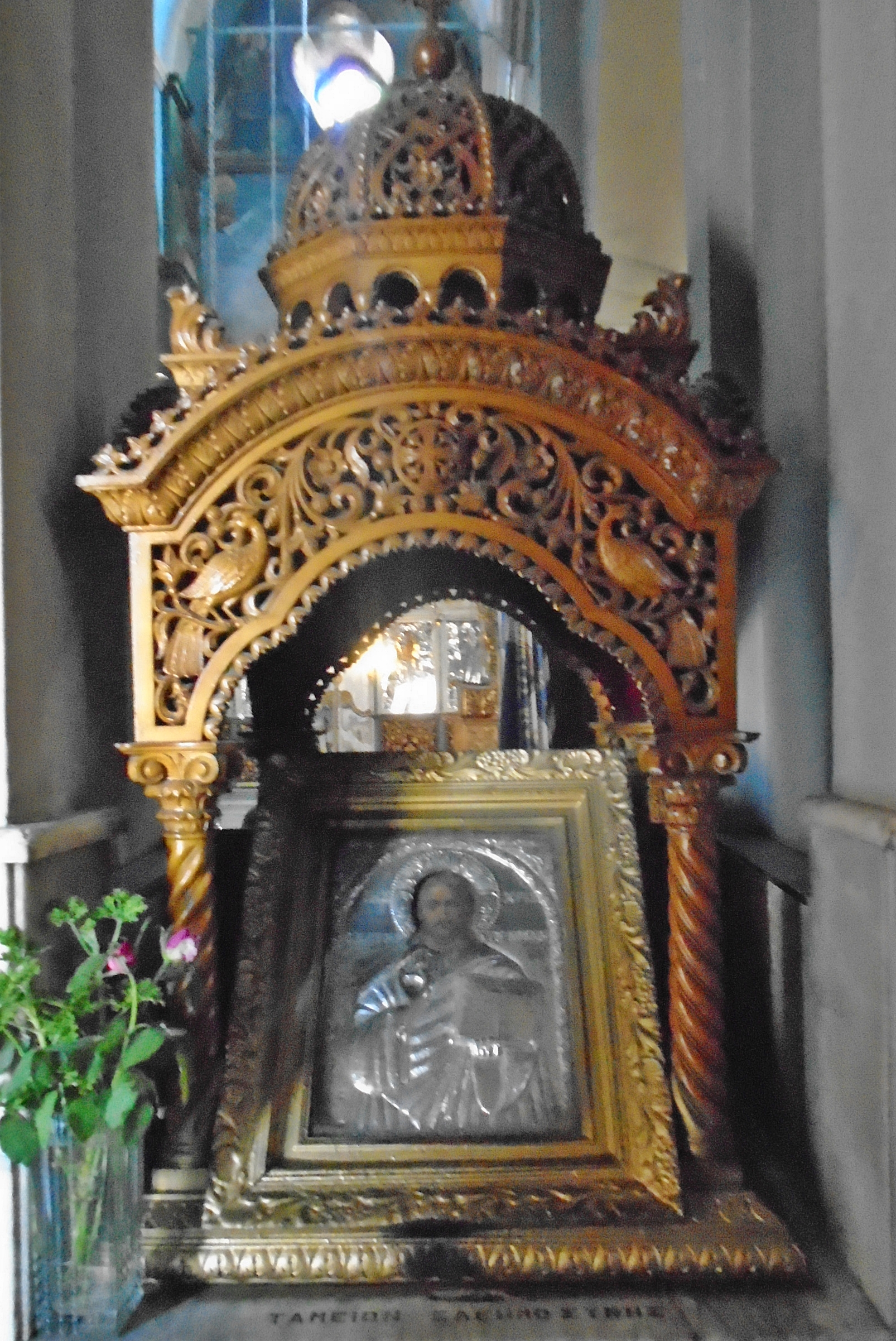
Icon in the nave

== See also ==
- Church of Crete
- List of Greek Orthodox cathedrals in Greece
