= List of cathedrals in Greece =

This is an incomplete list of cathedrals in Greece.

== Greek Orthodox ==
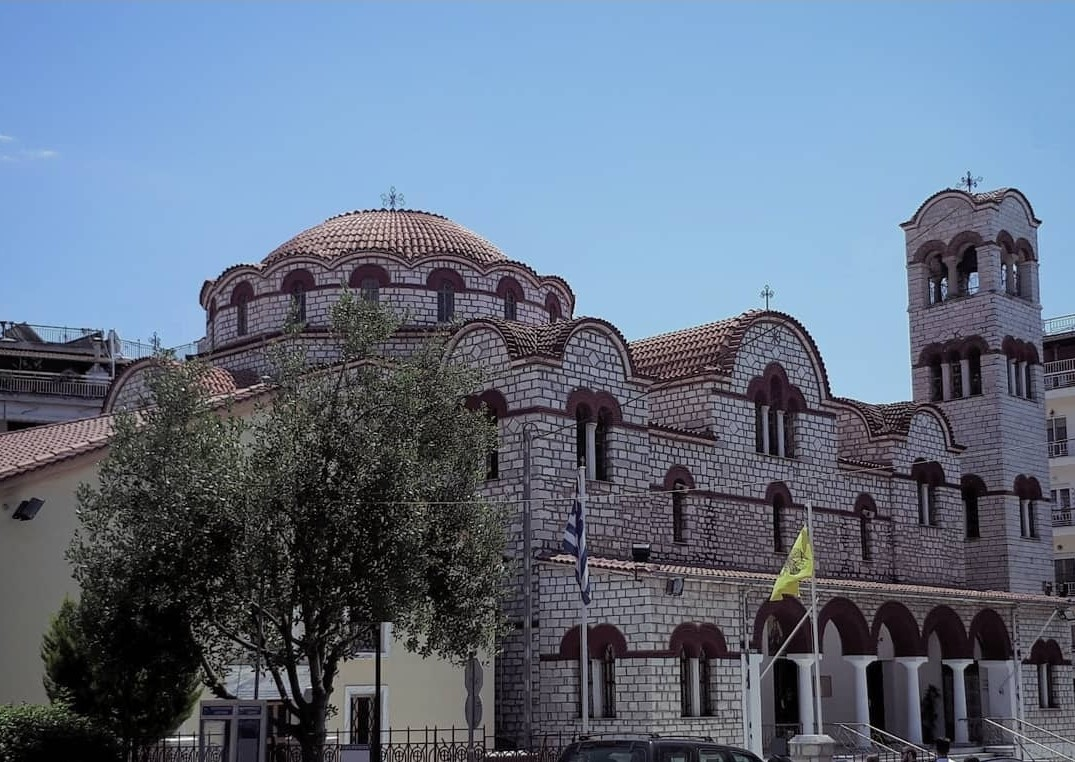
Drama Cathedral, Presentation of the Virgin Mary

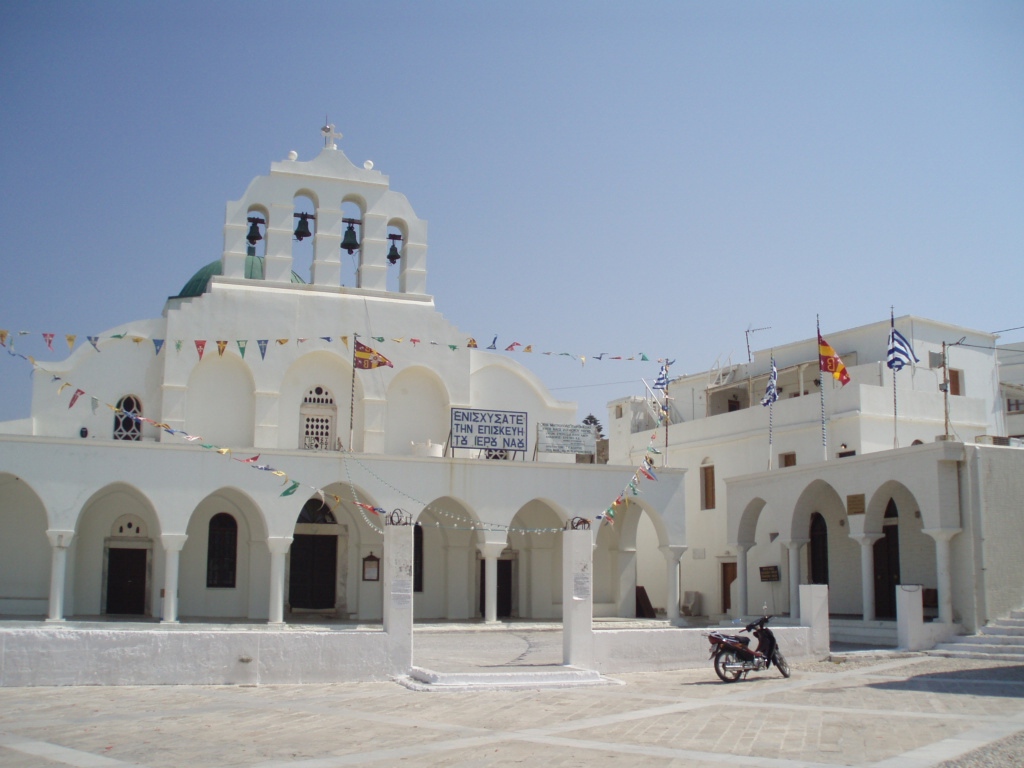
Naxos Metropolis Cathedral

Cathedral of St Nectarios

- Metropolitan Cathedral of Athens in Athens
- Agios Minas Cathedral in Heraklion
- St Andrew's Cathedral in Patras
- Drama Cathedral, Presentation of the Virgin Mary
- Naxos Cathedral in Naxos
- Cathedral of Saint Nectarios in Aegina
- Orthodox Metropolitan Cathedral in Fira, Santorini
- Presentation of the Virgin Mary Holy Metropolitan Orthodox Church, Chania, Crete
- Cathedral Church of St Nicholas in Volos
- Cathedral of the Three Hierarchs in Skiathos
- Holy Cathedral Church of Agia Paraskevi Lagada in Langadas
- Holy Cathedral of St. Athananasiou in Didymoteicho
- Cathedral of The Annunciation of Our Lady on Lesbos

== Catholic ==
=== Latin Catholic ===
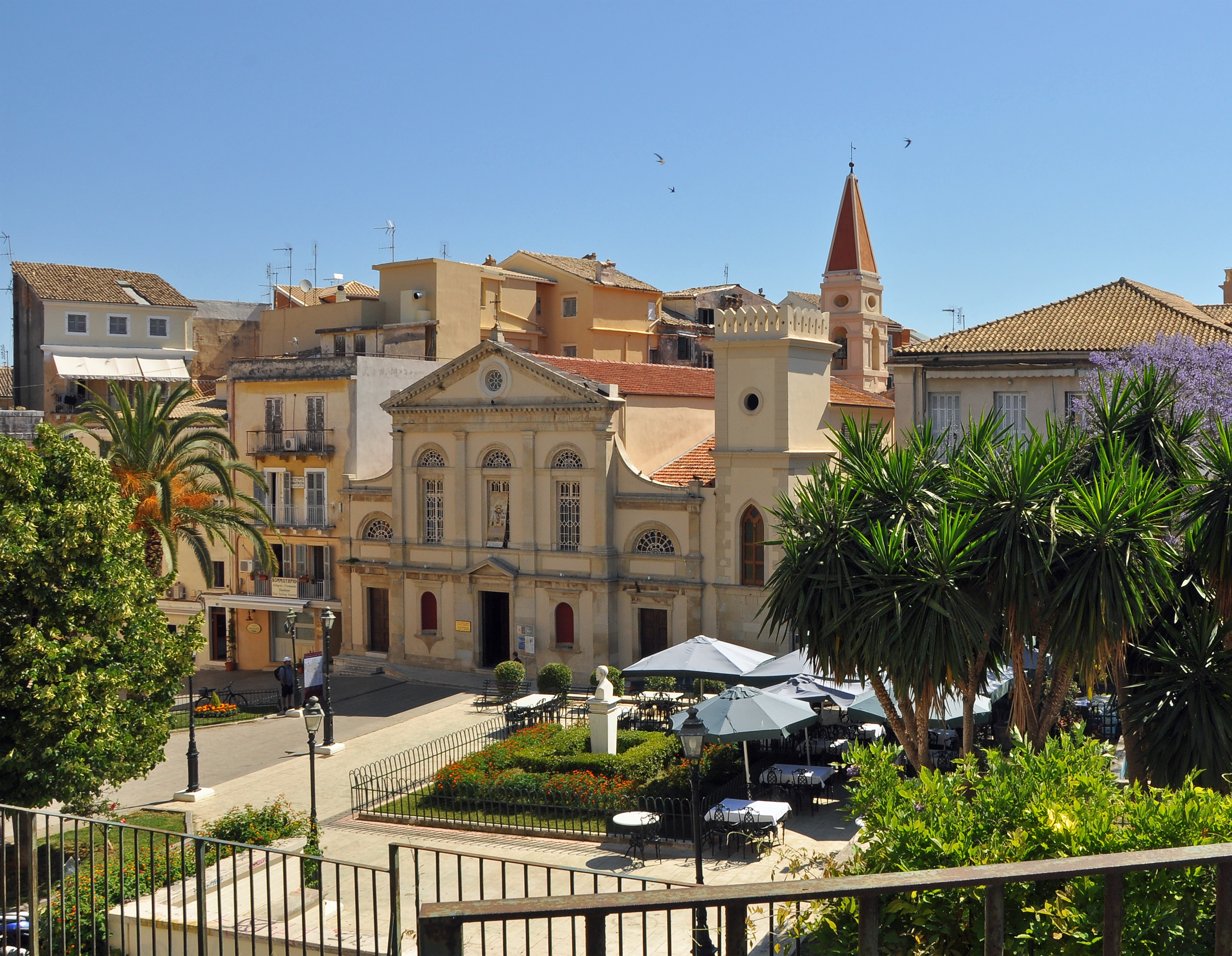
Corfu cathedral

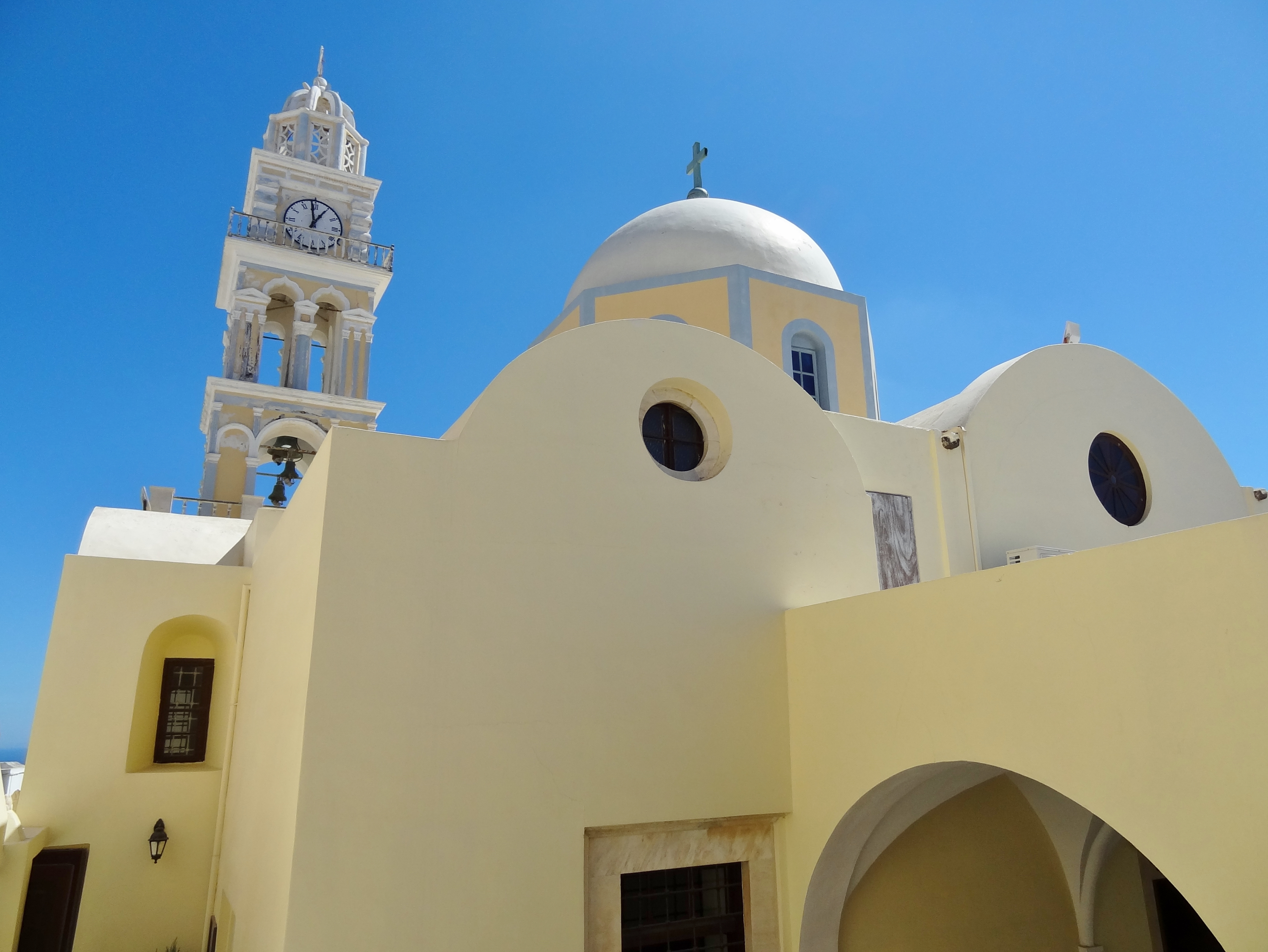
Cathedral in Fira, Santorini

Cathedrals of the Roman Catholic Church in Greece (Diocese in brackets):

- Cathedral Basilica of St. Dionysious in Athens (Athens)
- Cathedral of St. Nicolaos in Chios (Chios)
- Cathedral of St. Jacob (or James) and Christopher in Corfu (Corfu, Zakynthos, and Cephalonia)
- Cathedral of the Assumption in Chania (Crete)
- Cathedral of Our Lady of the Rosary in Xinara, Tinos (Naxos, Tinos, Andros and Mykonos)
  - Co-Cathedral of the Presentation of the Lord in Chora
- Cathedral of St. Francis of Assisi in Rhodes (Rhodes)
- Cathedral of St. John the Baptist in Santorini (Santorini)
- Cathedral of St. George in Syros (Syros)
- Cathedral of the Immaculate Conception in Thessalonika (Thessalonika)

Former cathedrals

- Former Cathedral of St. John in Rhodes
- Former Cathedral of St. Mary in Castello in Rhodes

=== Greek Catholic ===
- Cathedral of the Holy Trinity in Athens

=== Armenian Catholic ===
- Armenian Church of St. Gregory the Illuminator in Athens

== See also ==
- Lists of cathedrals by country
