= St. George's Cathedral, Ano Syros =

Catholic cathedral in Ano Syros, Greece

Saint George's Cathedral
- Cathedral of Saint George
- Καθεδρικός Αγίου Γεωργίου
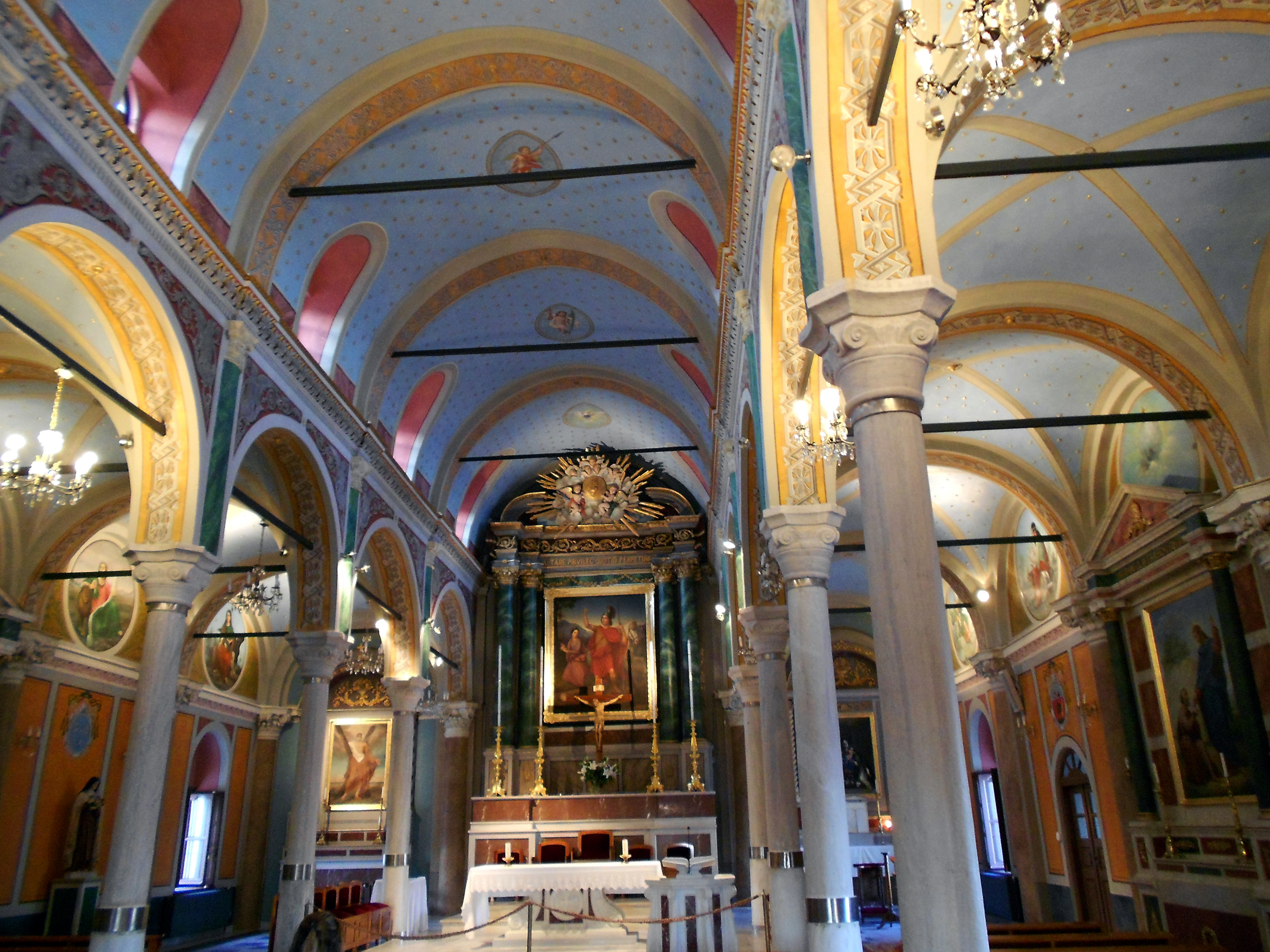
- Interior view of the cathedral

- Location of the cathedral in Greece
- Saint George's Cathedral
- 37°27′03″N 24°56′07″E
- Location: Ano Syros, Syros, Cyclades, South Aegean
- Country: Greece
- Language: Greek
- Denomination: Roman Catholic
- Website: episkopisyrou.gr (in Greek)

History
- Status: Cathedral

Architecture
- Functional status: Active
- Architectural type: Church
- Completed: 1834 (current structure)

Administration
- Province: Greece
- Archdiocese: Naxos, Andros, Tinos and Mykonos
- Diocese: Syros and Milos

Clergy
- Bishop: vacant (as of December 2025)

The Saint George's Cathedral, officially the Cathedral of Saint George (Greek: Καθεδρικός Αγίου Γεωργίου), is a Roman Catholic cathedral located in the town of Ano Syros, on the island of Syros, Cyclades, in the South Aegean region of Greece. The cathedral serves as the seat for the Bishop of Syros and Milos.

== Overview ==
The original church was built on top of a hill in c. 1200. In 1617, it was destroyed by the Turks and was subsequently rebuilt. In 1652, the church became the cathedral of the Diocese of Syros and Milos. Rebuilt in 1834, the cathedral has a modern look. In the church there are the icon of Saint George and the icon of the Mother of God, Panagias tis Elpidas, of artistic and cultural value. The church has also a portrait of Bishop Ioannis Andreas Kargas, who was hanged by the Turks.

== See also ==
- Catholic Church in Greece
- List of churches in Greece
