= Syros =

Greek island

Syros Περιφερειακή ενότητα Σύρου Δήμος Σύρου-Ερμούπολης
- Regional unit and municipality
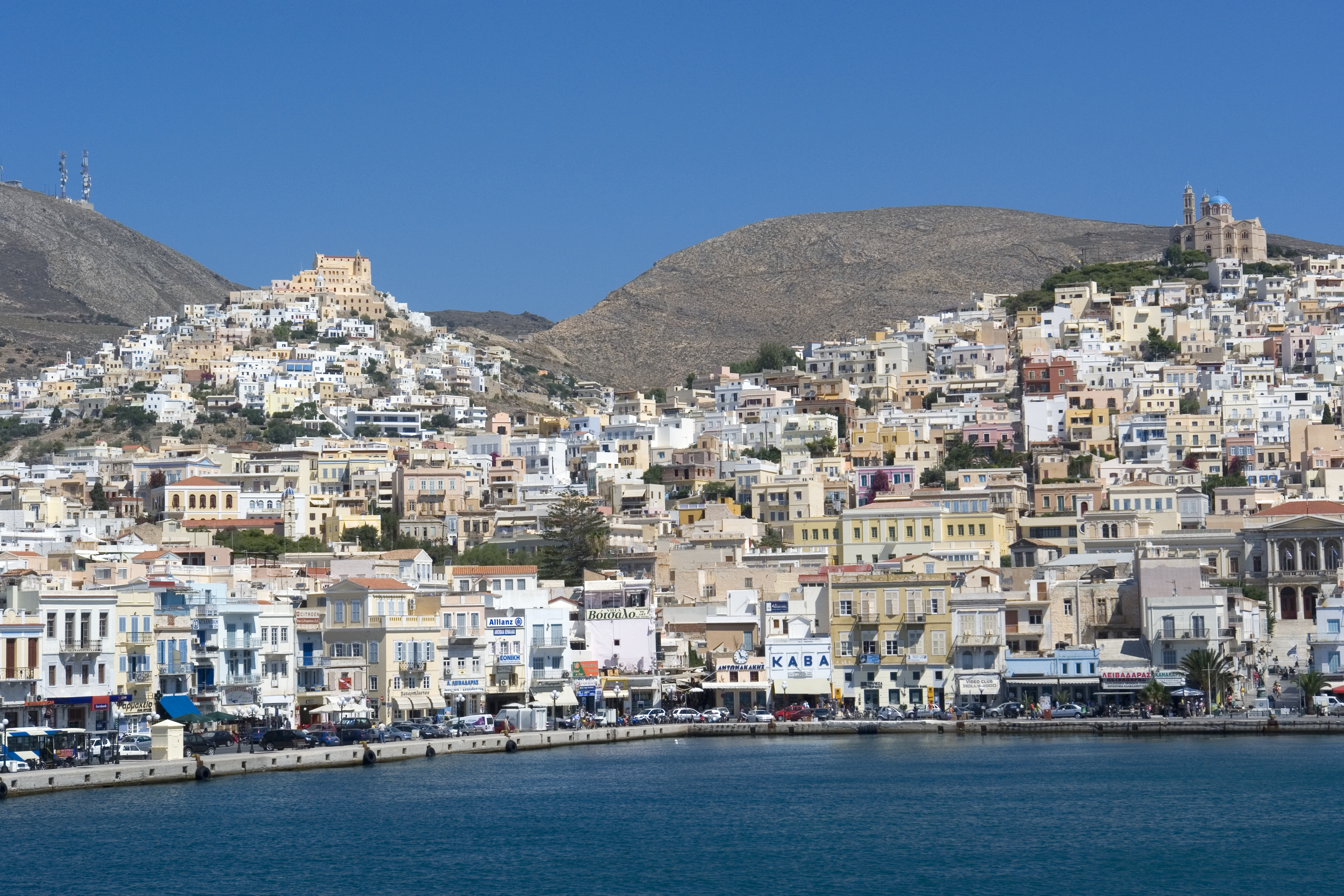
- Ermoupoli and Ano Syros

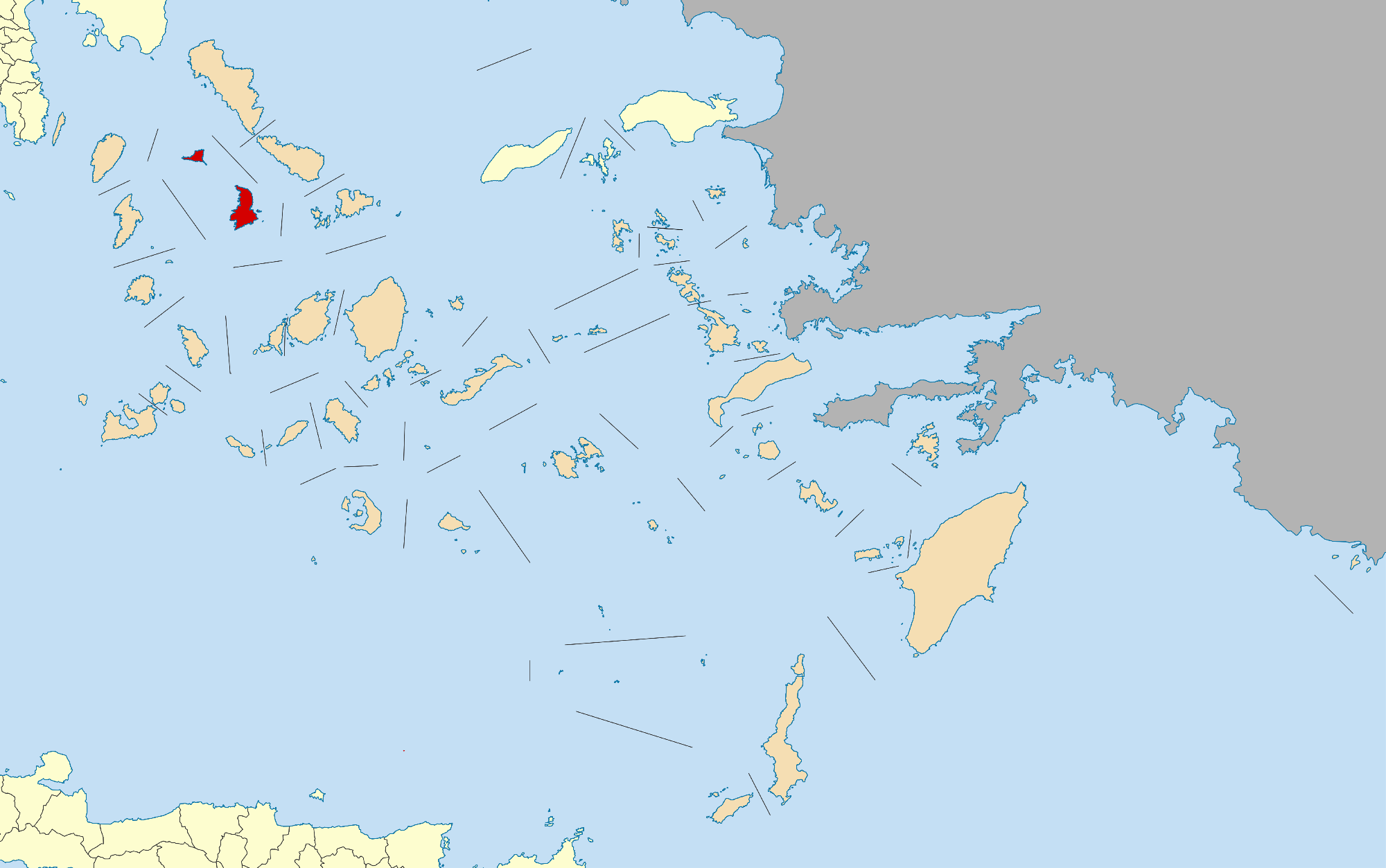
- Syros within the South Aegean

- Location within Greece
- Coordinates: 37°26′N 24°55′E
- Country: Greece
- Administrative region: South Aegean
- Seat: Ermoupoli

Area
  - Municipality: 101.9 km^{2} (39.3 sq mi)

Population (2021)
  - Municipality: 21,124
  - Density: 207.3/km^{2} (536.9/sq mi)
- Time zone: UTC+2 (EET)
  - Summer (DST): UTC+3 (EEST)
- Postal code: 841 xx
- Area code: 228x0
- Vehicle registration: EM

Syros (Greek: Σύρος, romanized: Sýros, [ˈsiros]), also known as Siros or Syra, is a Greek island in the Cyclades, in the Aegean Sea. It is 78 nautical miles (144 km) south-east of Athens. The area of the island is 83.6 km^{2} (32 sq mi) and at the 2021 census it had 21,124 inhabitants.

The largest towns are Ermoupoli, Ano Syros, and Vari. Ermoupoli is the capital of the island, the Cyclades, and the South Aegean. It has always been a significant port town, and during the 19th century it was even more significant than Piraeus. Other villages are Galissas, Foinikas, Pagos, Manna, Kini, Azolimnos and Poseidonia.

== Ermoupoli ==
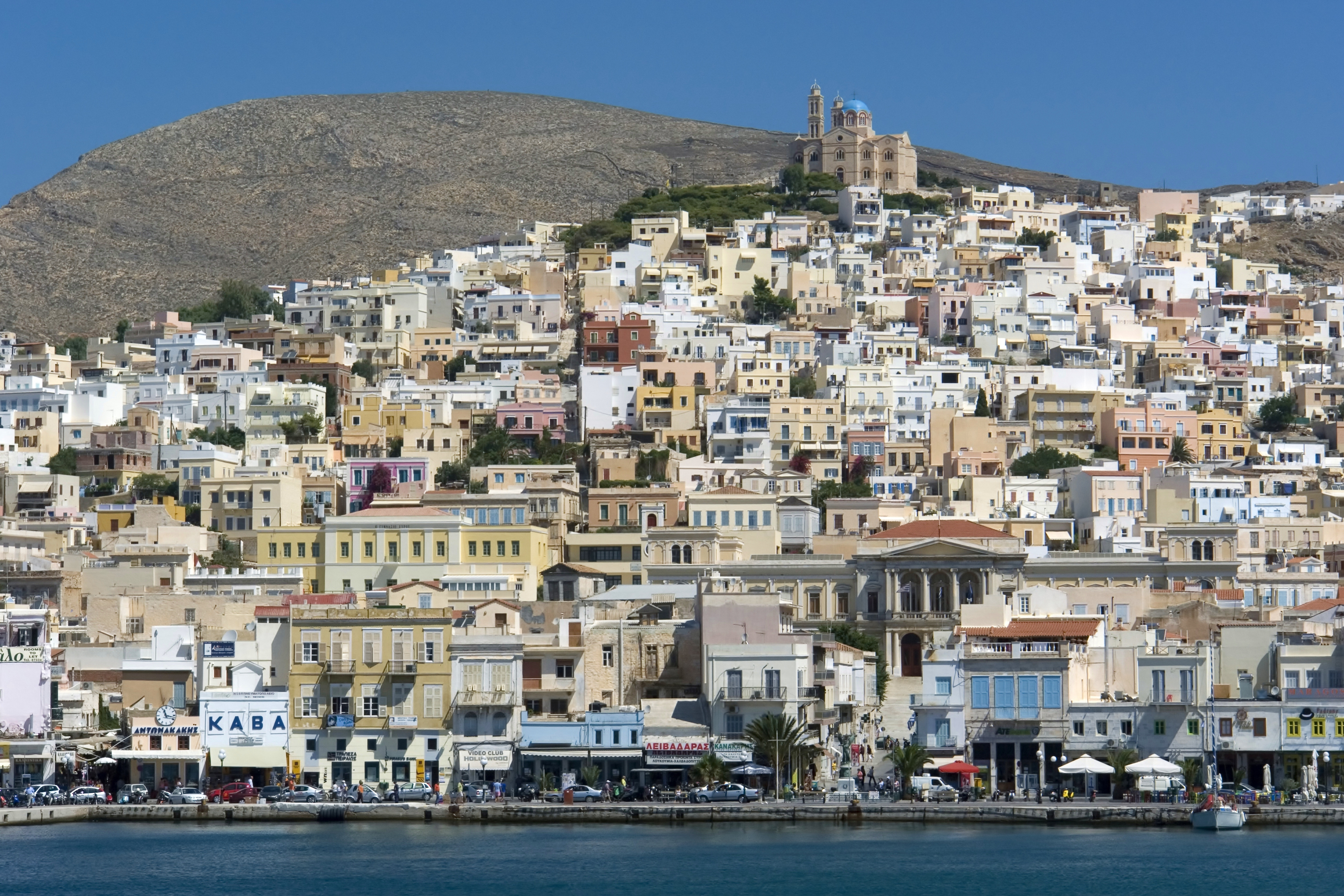
The port of Ermoupoli

Ermoupoli (Greek: Ερμούπολη) stands on a naturally amphitheatrical site, with neo-classical buildings, old mansions, and white houses cascading down to the harbour. It was built during the Greek War of Independence in the 1820s.

The city hall is in the center of the town, in Miaoulis Square, ringed with cafés, seating areas, and palm trees. Dubbed the "City of Hermes", Syros has numerous churches, such as Metamorphosis, Koimisis, St. Demetrius, Three Hierarchs, Anastasis, Evangelistria, and St. Nicolas. There is an archaeological museum and a municipal library.

The quarter of Vaporia is where sea captains traditionally lived. There are numerous neo-classical mansions along the quarter's narrow streets.

== Ano Syros ==
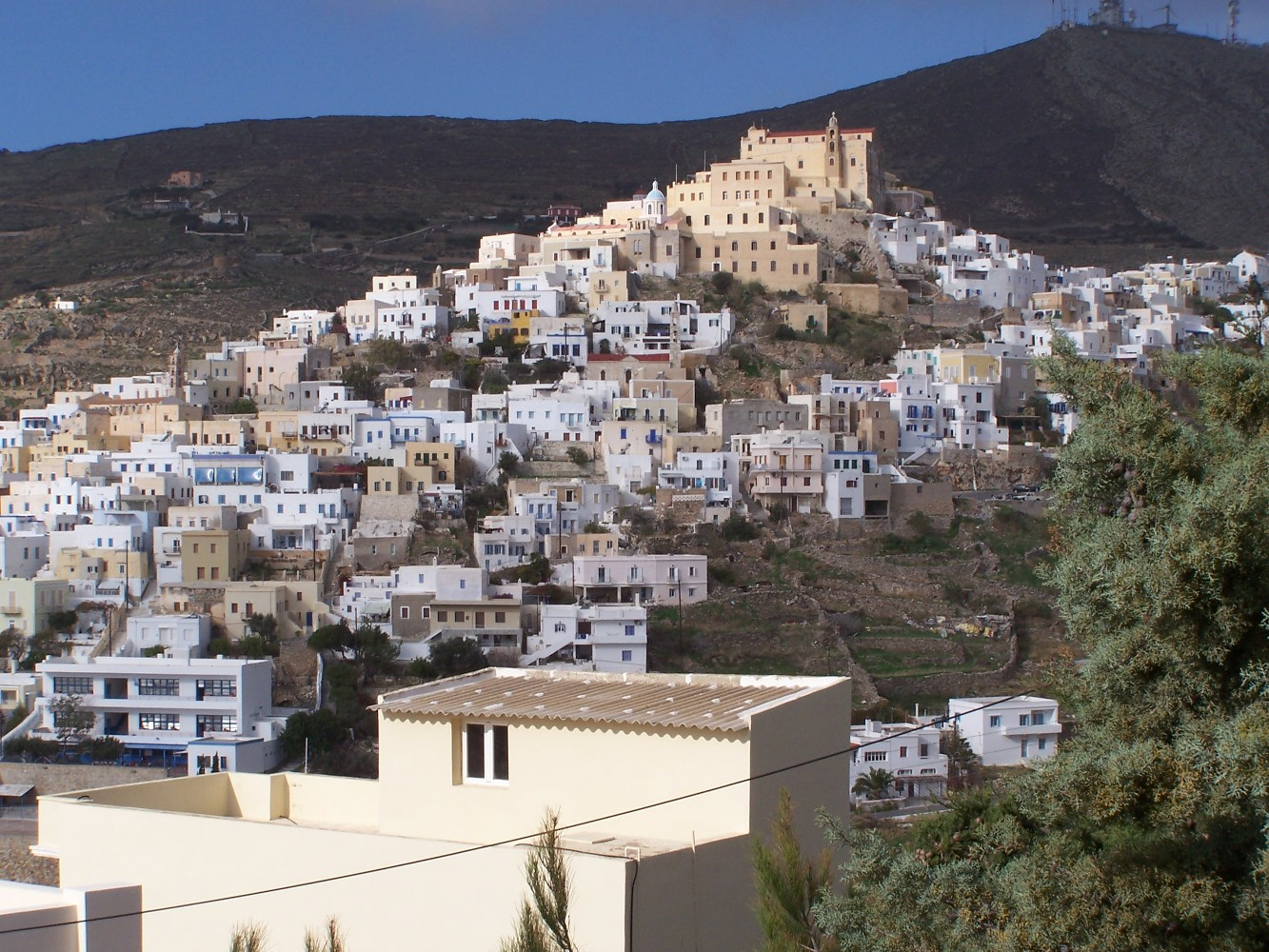
Ano Syros

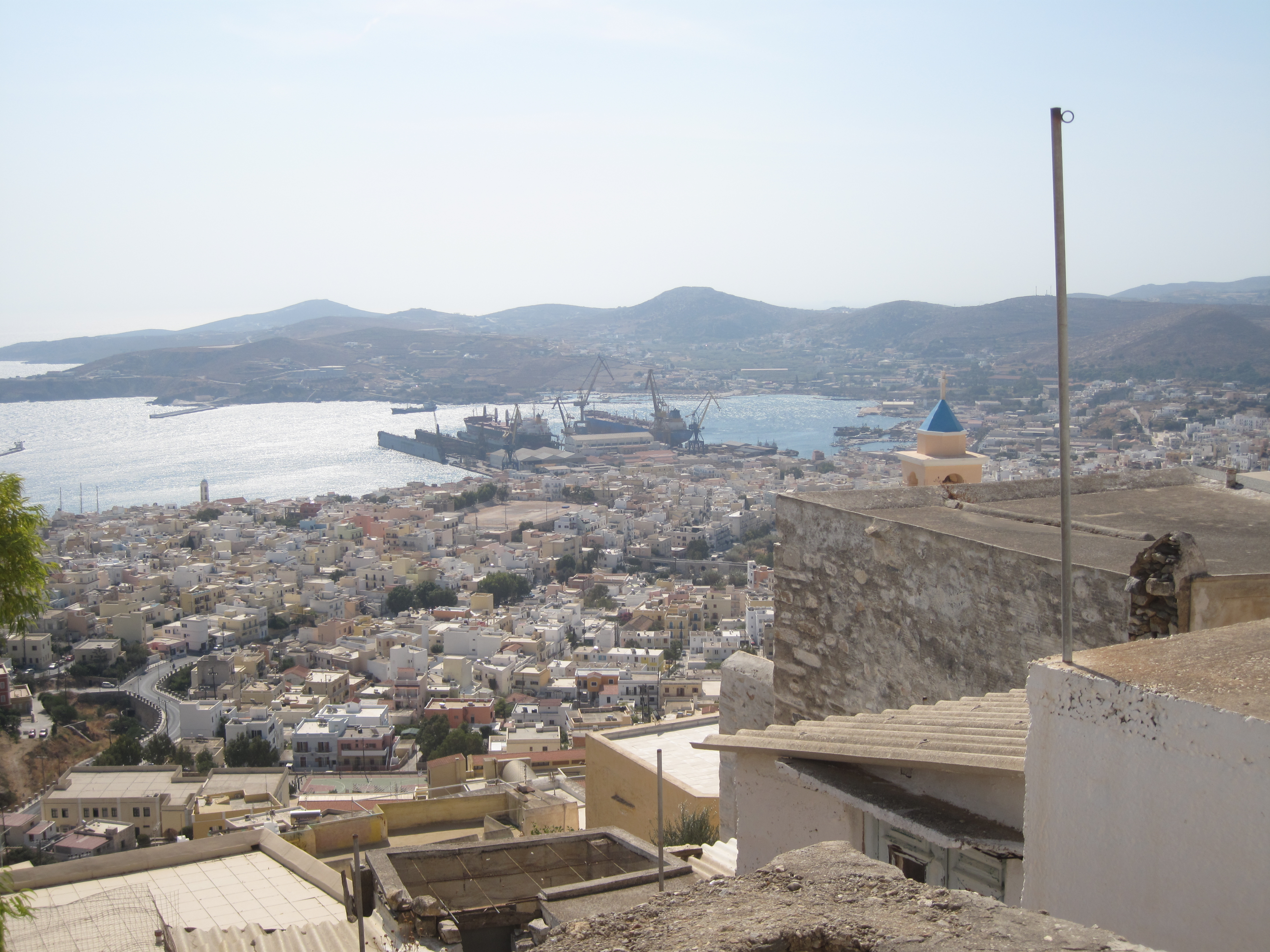
View from Ano Syros

Ano Syros is the second town of Syros and was built by the Venetians at the beginning of the 13th century on the hill of San Giorgio, north-west of Ermoupoli. Ano Syros maintains a medieval atmosphere. Innumerable steps between narrow streets and houses with coloured doors lead to the top of the town. Although the medieval settlement of Ano Syros is accessible by car; the town itself is mostly navigable by a network of marble steps. The distance from the harbour up to the main entry point of the town is about 1000 metres. The Catholic cathedral of Saint George dominates Ano Syros. The cathedral church was constructed during the 13th century. From the cathedral visitors have a panoramic view of the neighbouring islands of Tinos, Delos, Mykonos, Paros, Andros and Naxos.

== History ==
=== Kastri culture ===
The history of settlement on Syros goes back at least 5,000 years, to the Early Bronze Age of the Cycladic civilization. This is when the hill-top settlement of Kastri began. Archaeologists describe Early Cycladic III (ECIII) culture as Kastri culture. It had links with the Anatolian Trade Network, connected with Limantepe in Asia Minor.

Kastri, dated by archaeologists to 2800-2300 BC, was one of the earliest settlements in Greece that were protected by stone walls with rounded bastions. Also the cemetery of Chalandriani is associated with Kastri. Inside the fortification, the houses shared party walls and were packed close together. It is estimated that the fortified town was home to up to 300 people.

The site was first discovered and excavated in 1898 by Christos Tsountas, the "father of Cycladic research". Kastri had some of the earliest metalwork in the region, and also some of the earliest use of potter's wheel.

=== Antiquity ===
Throughout history, the island was known as Syra (Ancient Greek: Σύρα), then Syros or Siros (Σῦρος). In later times, it appears to have been inhabited by the Phoenicians. In the Odyssey, Syros was the country of the swineherd Eumaeus who described it at length (Odyssey, XV, 403 sq.), although it has also been suggested that Eumaeus referred to Syracuse, Sicily.

The island was also the home of the philosopher Pherecydes, the teacher of Pythagoras. It possessed two leading cities, Syros (now the modern Ermoupoli) and another city (Galessus) on the western coast where Galissas now stands.

=== Middle Ages ===
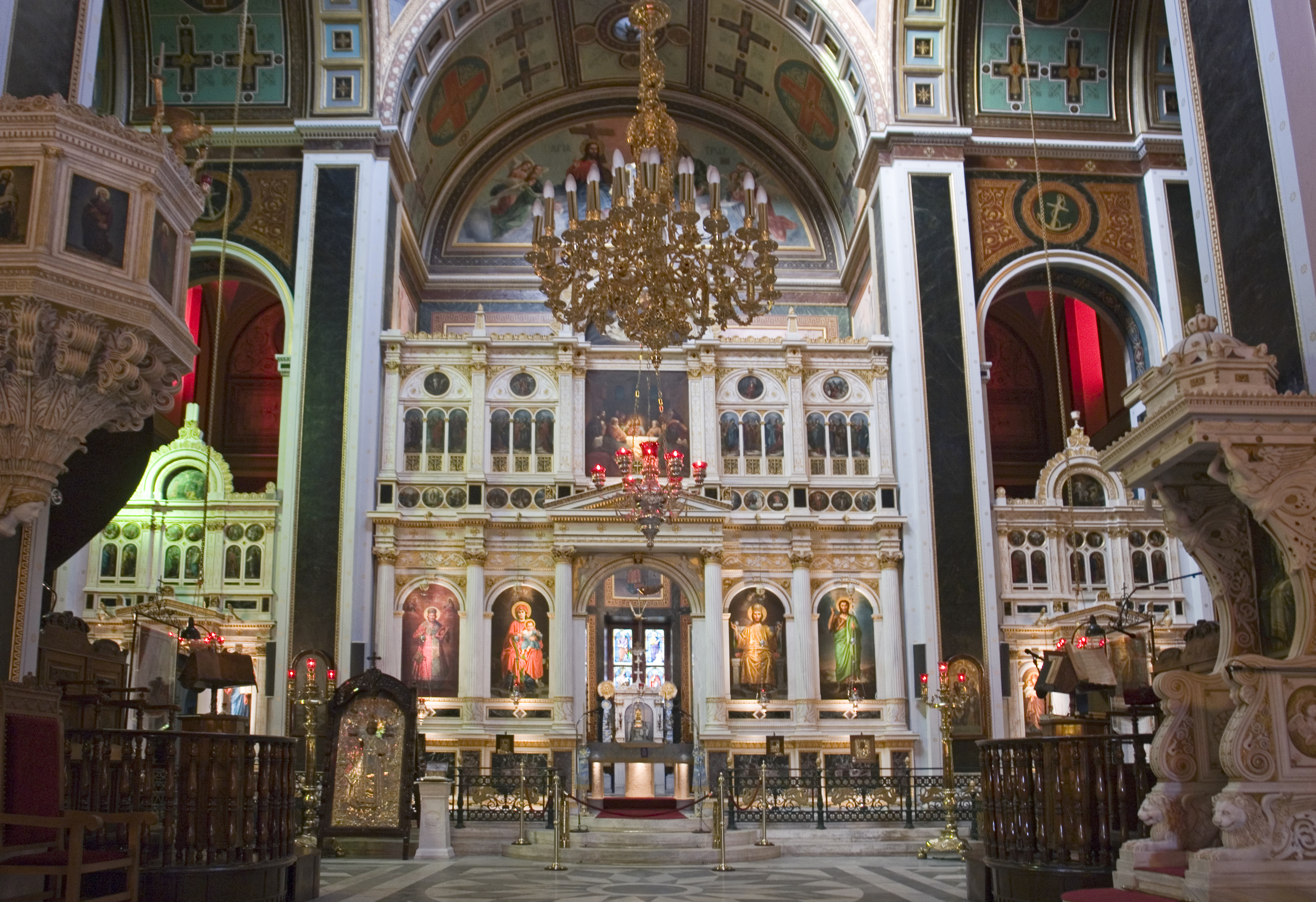
Inside the Cathedral of Saint Nicholas in Ermoupolis, patron saint of Syros.

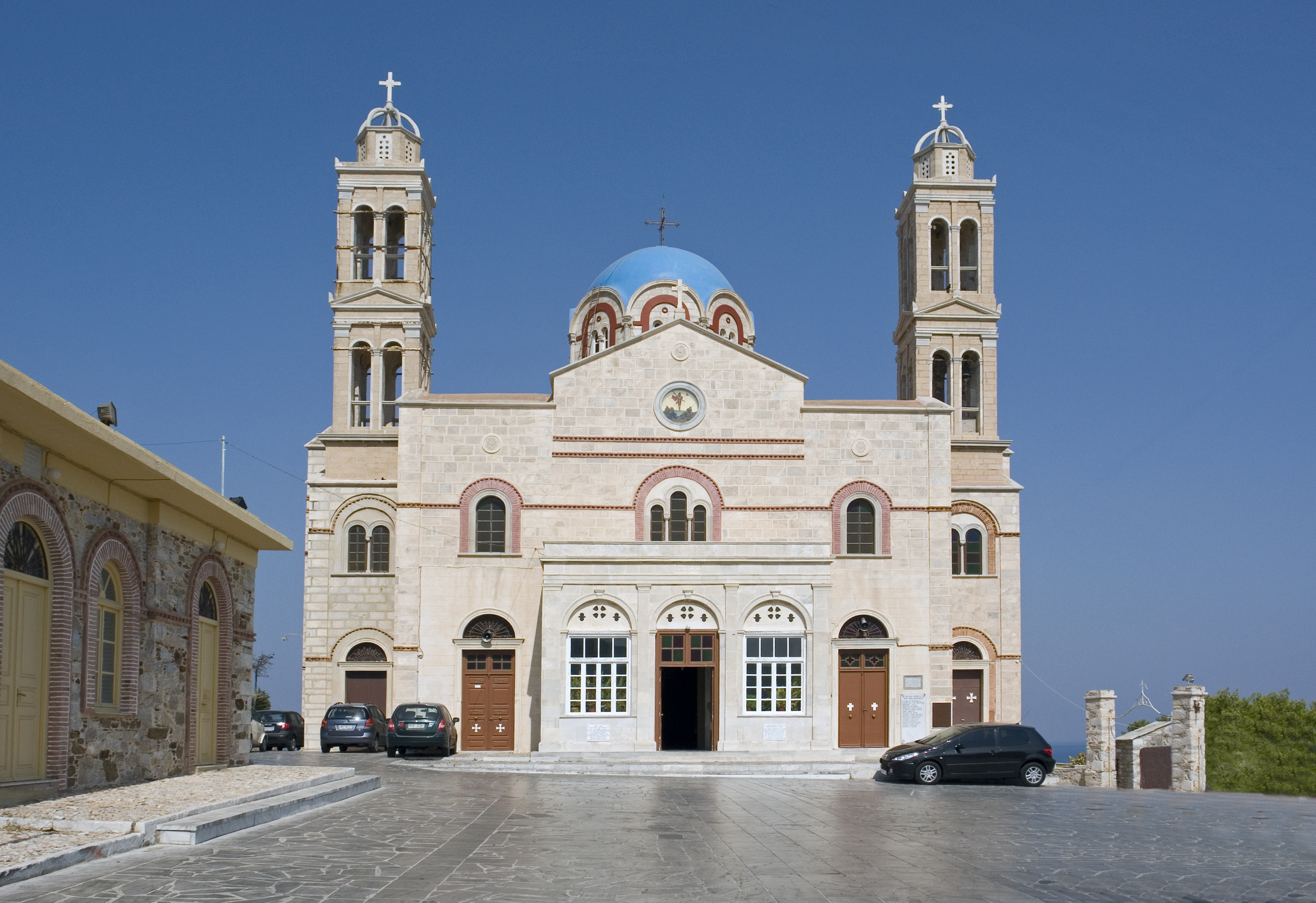
Anastaseos church in Vrodado.

At the end of ancient times, barbarian raids and piracy, which affected the Aegean for many centuries, led Syros to decline. The island, along with the other Cyclades, was devastated several times during the Middle Ages by raiders from different directions including Sicilians, Arabs, Turks and Venetians.

In the Byzantine years Syros constituted part of the Theme of the Aegean Sea, along with the rest of the Cycladic islands. After the overthrow of Byzantium in the Fourth Crusade by the Venetians and Franks in 1204, the island was definitively conquered by the Venetians under the leadership of Marco Sanudo. As part of the Duchy of the Archipelago, Syros would remain under Venetian rule until 1566 although after 1540 this was only maintained by payment of tribute to the Ottoman Sultan.

It was at this time that Ano Syros was founded. During the Latin period, the majority of the local community were Roman Catholics, but maintained the Greek language. During the reign of almost three and a half centuries of the Duchy of the Archipelago, Syros had a singular feudal regime.

=== Ottoman Era ===
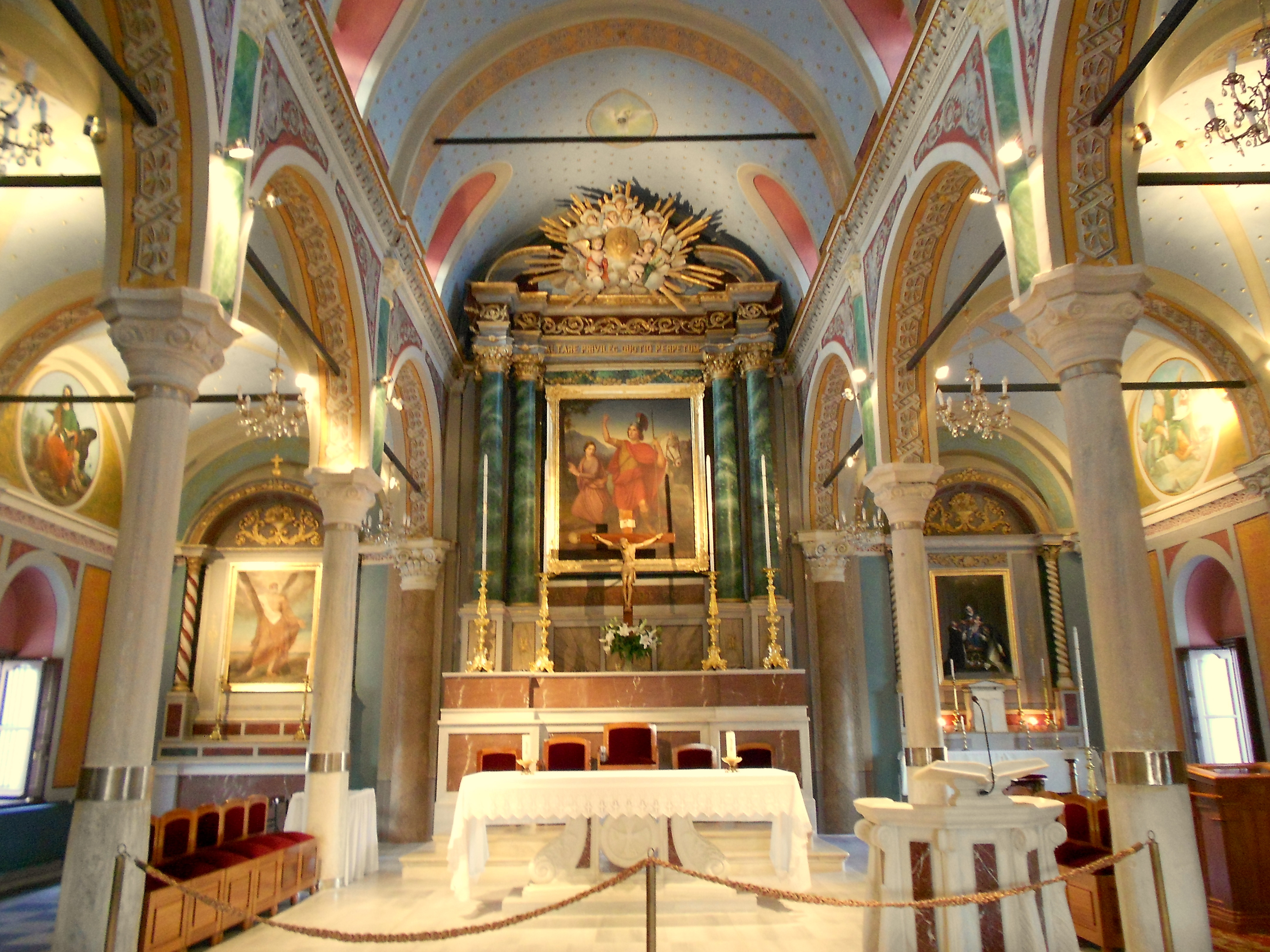
Saint George's Cathedral (Roman Catholic)

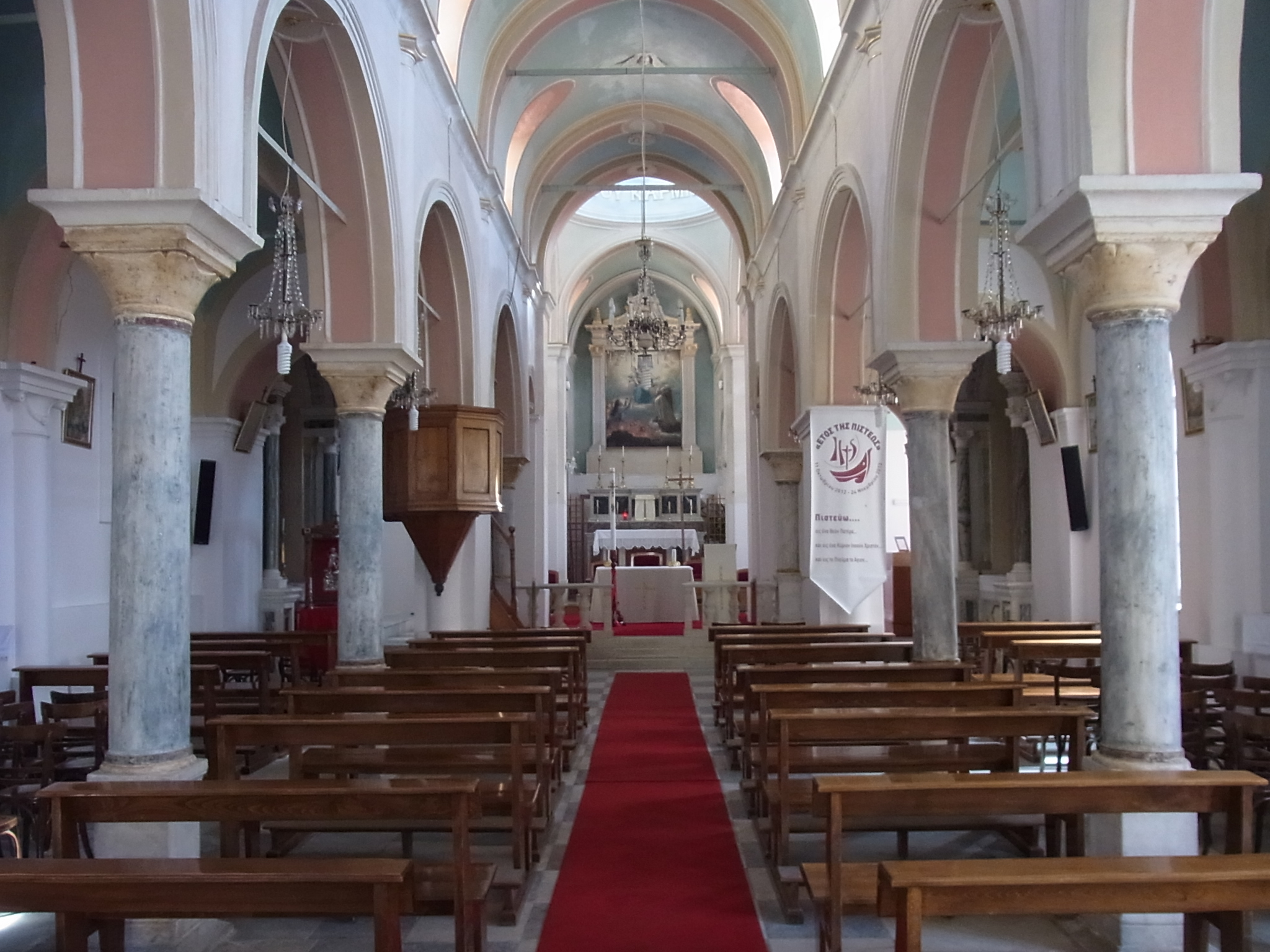
Catholic Church of Saint John (1640), Ano Syros

By the 16th century, the Ottoman fleet became dominant in the Aegean and the Duchy fell apart. In 1522 the corsair Barbarossa took possession of the island, which would be known as "Sire" during Ottoman rule. However, negotiations of the local authorities with the Ottomans gave the Cyclades substantial privileges, such as religious freedom and the reduction of taxes.

The Roman Catholic diocese of Syros was a Latin diocese, suffragan of Naxos. The Venetians had established there a Latin bishopric which was subject to the Latin Archbishopric of Athens until 1525. From the time of the island's occupation by the Turks in the 16th century, the Greeks established an Orthodox metropolitan on Syros: Joseph is the earliest known, along with Symeon who died in 1594 and Ignatius in 1596. The island became for the most part Catholic.

The list of titular bishops may be found in Le Quien and in Eubel. The most celebrated among them is Ioannis Andreas Kargas, whom the Turks strangled in 1617 because he refused to convert to Islam and because he was helping Greek revolutionaries hiding on the island.

After the second half of the 17th century, a period of economic recovery of the Aegean began, climaxing during the transition from the 18th to the 19th century. The special regime of the islands allowed the development of local self-government. The decline of piracy since the beginning of the 19th century led to the gradual liberation of the sea routes of the Eastern Mediterranean.

=== In Independent Greece ===
==== Greek War of Independence and 19th century ====
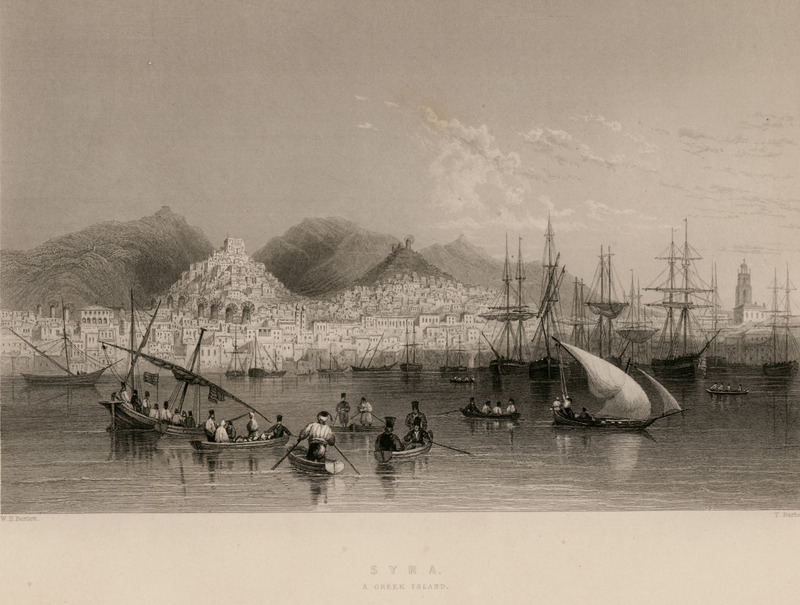
Syros in 1836

Due to its crucial geographical position, Syros became an important maritime way-point. Moreover, the special social, religious and institutional conditions prevailing on the island, led Syriots to neutrality at the beginning of the Greek Revolution in 1821. As a result, Syros became a secure shelter during the Revolution, attracting many Greek refugees from Asia Minor, Chios, Spetses, Psara, Aivali, Smyrna, Kydonia and Kassos. These refugees built Ermoupoli.

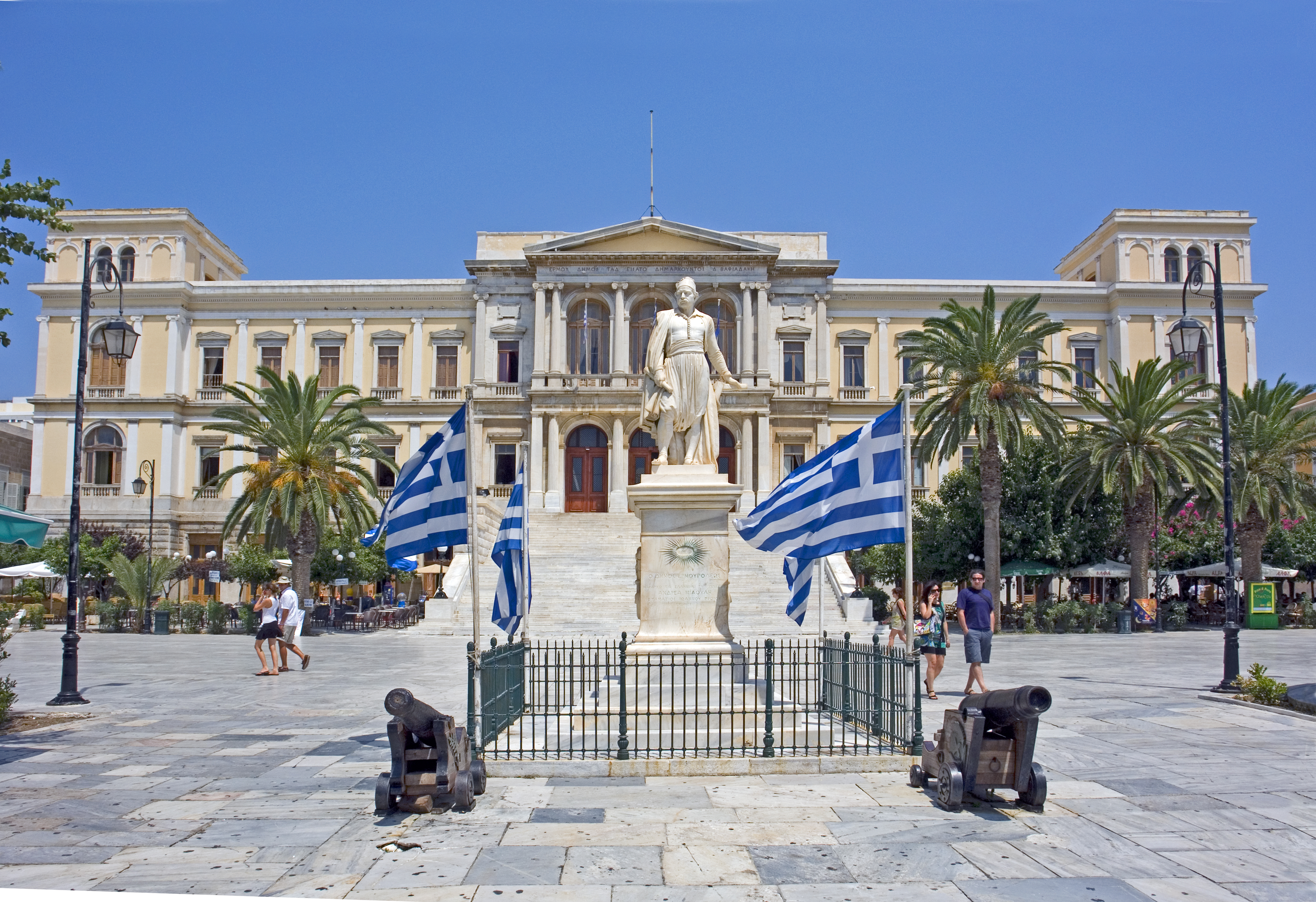
Ermoupolis City Hall, designed by Ernst Ziller, with the statue of Andreas Miaoulis at Miaoulis Square (work of Georgios Bonanos).

In 1827 Syros became part of the newly founded First Hellenic Republic and later (1834) the Greek Kingdom. Syros became known as a cross-road in the Aegean and as an international commercial center linking Western Europe and the Mediterranean sea to the East.

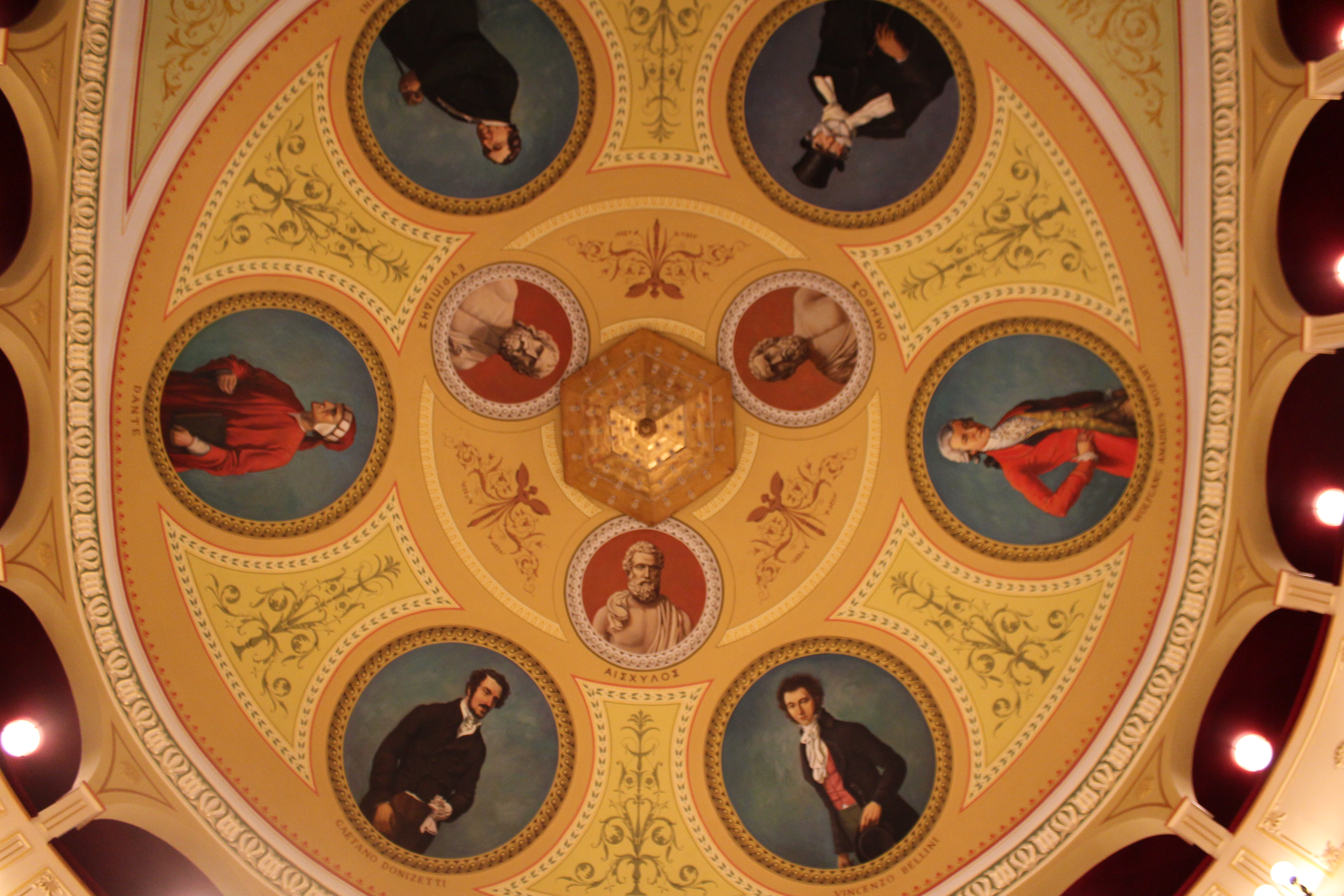
Apollo Theatre ceiling

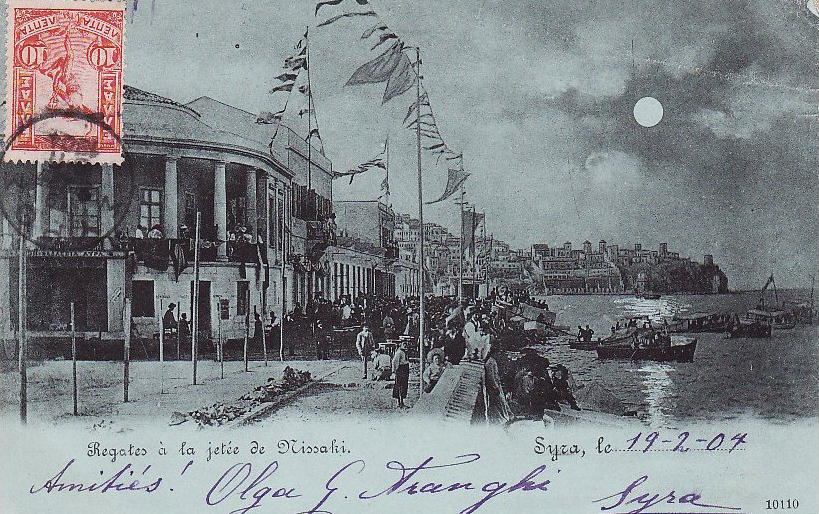
Postcard of Syros, 1904.

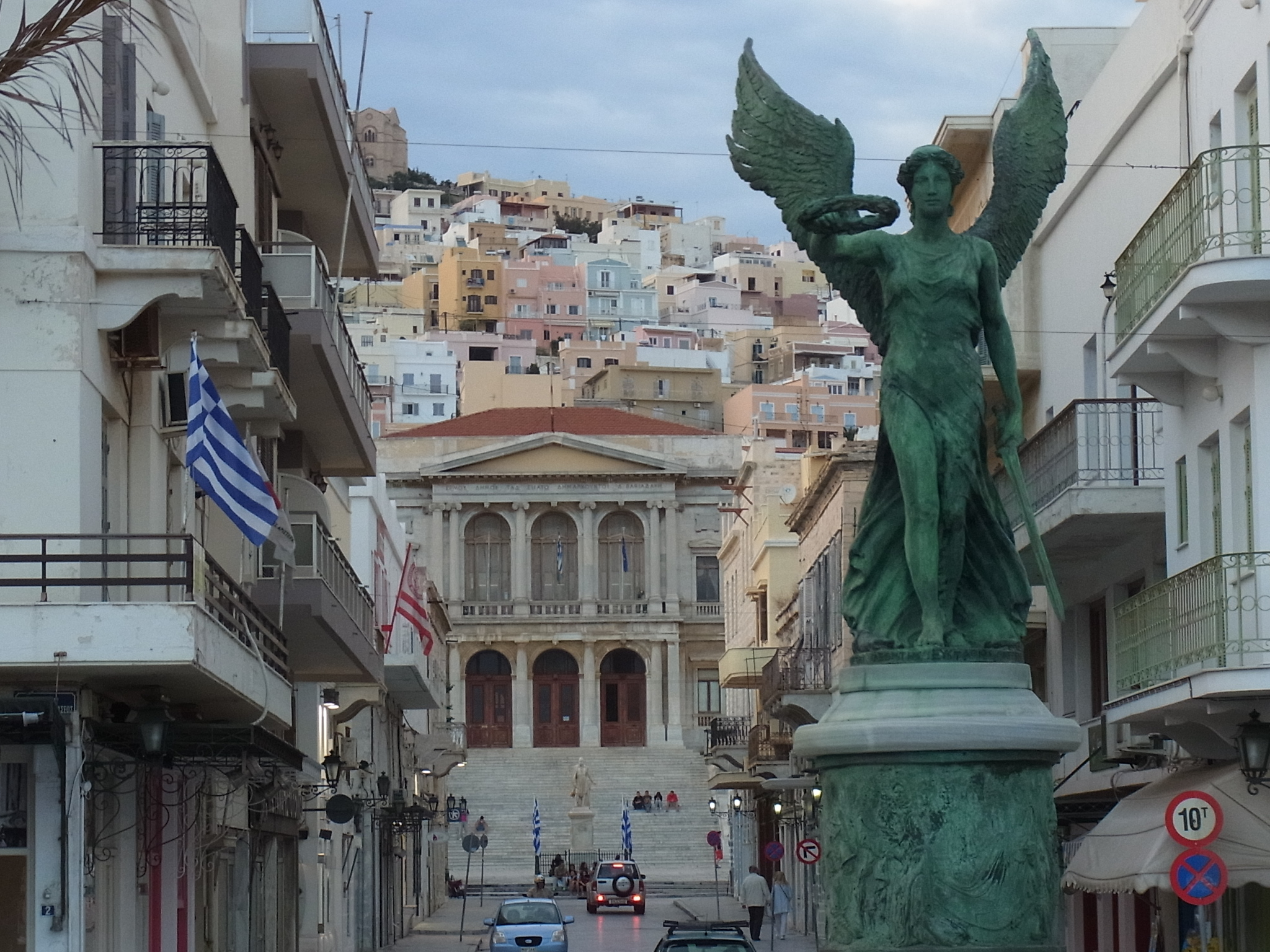
Venizelou street in Ermoupolis

Because of the Venetian domination from the Middle Ages onwards, the islanders had a Roman Catholic majority. However, due to immigration from other islands, Catholics now constitute some 47% of the population. The majority of the population are Greek Orthodox. Intermarriage between Churches is very common in Syros. There is also a single parish of the Byzantine Greek Catholic Church.

During 1831 Syros played a prominent role in the unfolding of the new Greek Constitution. Under Ioannis Kapodistrias (Giovanni Capo D'Istria), the first Governor of the new state, the population of Ermoupolis had reached 13,805 residents and the city had evolved into a seat of government.

It had a Commercial Court of Law, a post office (one of the first in Greece), insurance brokerages, the first public school, a branch of the National Bank of Greece, art gallery, museum, library, a social club for the elite society etc. However, in 1854 cholera and a series of other epidemics plunged Syros into mourning. A number of charitable institutions for public health and social services were established during this period: orphanages, poorhouses and a mental hospital.

Newcomers, mainly mariners and tradesmen, gave the island a new dynamic, which along with its demographic and economic development, turned it into an administrative and cultural centre. Newcomers flocked to the island and founded the town of Ermoupoli, which rapidly became the leading port of Greece.

Between 1822 and 1865, Ermoupoli was rebuilt in a Neoclassical style, merging Greek Classicism with elements of the Renaissance. Many landmarks such as the City Hall (designed by the German architect Ernst Ziller), the Apollo Theatre by the Italian architect Pietro Campo (a miniature version of the La Scala in Milan), the main Library, the General Hospital of Syros (Vardakeio-Proio), Miaoulis square and other buildings were built during that period of time. Passing through on 6 April 1864, the effect of all the sugary marble is such that the English artist Edward Lear, refers to the town fondly in his diary as "the old sparkly pile".

The European architects (mainly Germans and Italians) and also Greeks who participated in the design and planning of Ermoupolis respected the classical and ancient Greek architecture and harmonized it with the romanticism of the West. Ermoupoli has a high density of neoclassical architecture. The prosperity of Syros was connected with the development of social and cultural life. The evolutionary cycle was completed with the creation of the first industrial units during the decade of 1860–70.

Most public buildings, churches, schools, stadiums and many mansions were built in the same elegant and neoclassical style, making Ermoupoli at the time a very modern city with a unique character. As a result, Syros changed almost overnight from a rather quiet island into a vigorous centre of crafts, industry and production. Also, due to its large port of Ermoupoli, it turned into a major centre for ship building and refitting. Neorion was the first shipyard of Greece. To this very day, it remains a place where many ships are serviced and refitted.

Since 1830 the commerce of fabrics, silk, ship building, leather and iron developed on Syros and at the same time a powerful banking system was created. The tremendous growth and development of Ermoupolis continued and until 1860 Syros was the most important commercial harbour in Greece. Together with commerce and ship building, construction and public works were also developed. The Greek Steamship Company was founded in 1856.

A period of decline then followed, as sailing gave way to steam, the importance of the geographical situation of the island was reduced and Piraeus harbour finally took the predominant position in Greece - with the competition of Patras also reducing Syros' commercial importance.

==== 20th century ====
Beginning at the end of the 19th century and for several decades, a temporary economic recovery took place, due to the development of the textile industry ("Foustanos-Karellas-Velissaropoulos & Co").

As a result of the imperial ambitions and fascist ideology of Benito Mussolini's Italy, which invaded and occupied Syros during World War II, the island's inhabitants experienced a devastating famine causing thousands of deaths.

The Second World War reduced Syros' economic development, as was the case for every economic centre in Greece. However, already since the 1980s, along with the generalized economic recovery and the rise of the living standards in Greece, elements of improvement appeared with tourism as its central axis. At the same time, the re-opening of the Neorion shipyards, as well as a number of other activities, indicate that Syros is on an upward trend.

Ermoupoli today has 7 elementary schools, 2 junior high schools, 2 high schools, 2 technical schools and the Aegean University with a department of Fine Arts and system design, with a proposed future addition in Applied Arts and Visual Arts. The Syros Island National Airport, the Aegean casino, the frequent passenger boat transportation system and all other modern amenities help to attract many domestic and foreign tourists to the island all year round.

Syros also has a British cemetery where various people are buried, including many seamen and servicemen who died in the Cyclades region, particularly during the Second World War. The numerous consulates of countries such as France, Britain, Italy, the Netherlands and Scandinavian countries bear witness to the connection of Syros with the wider European scene.

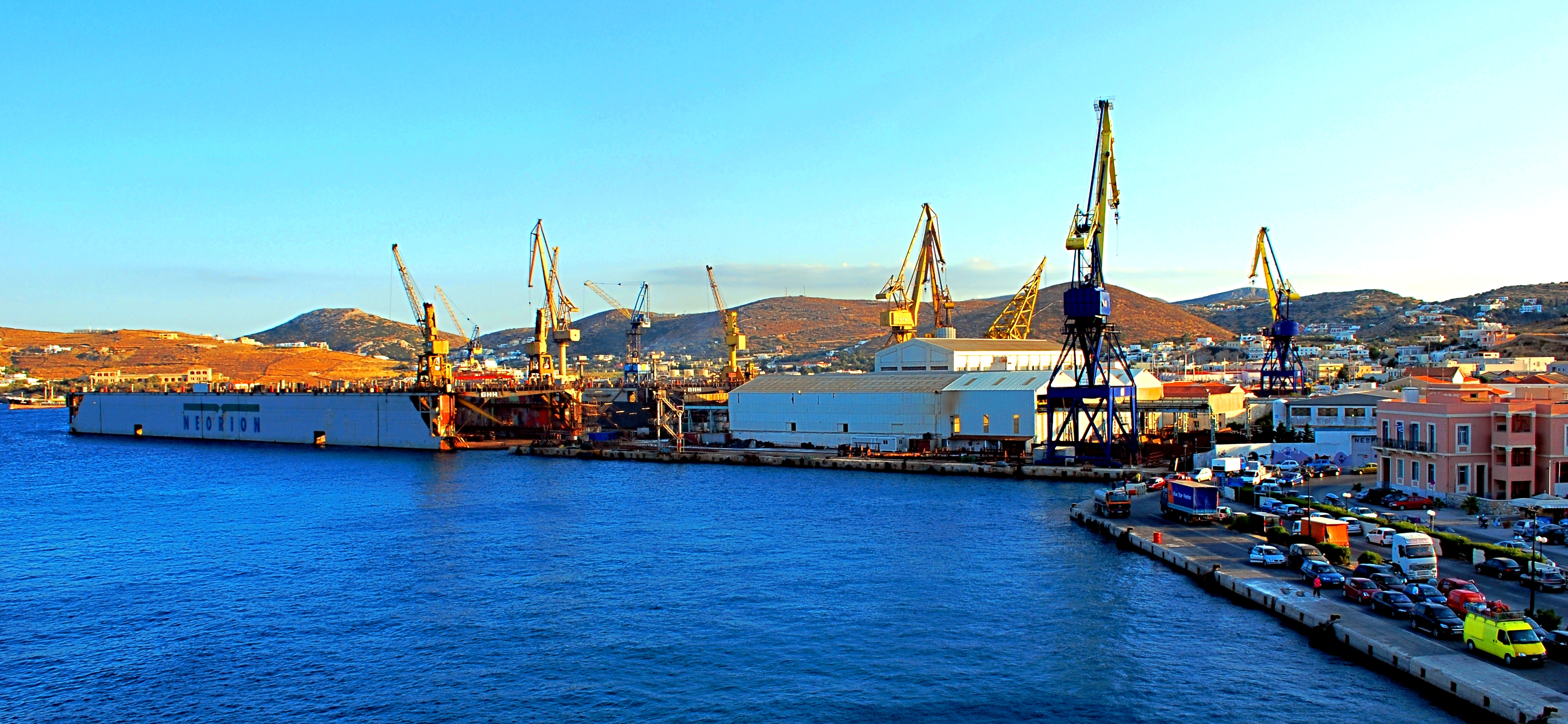
View of the Neorion shipyards.

== Administration ==
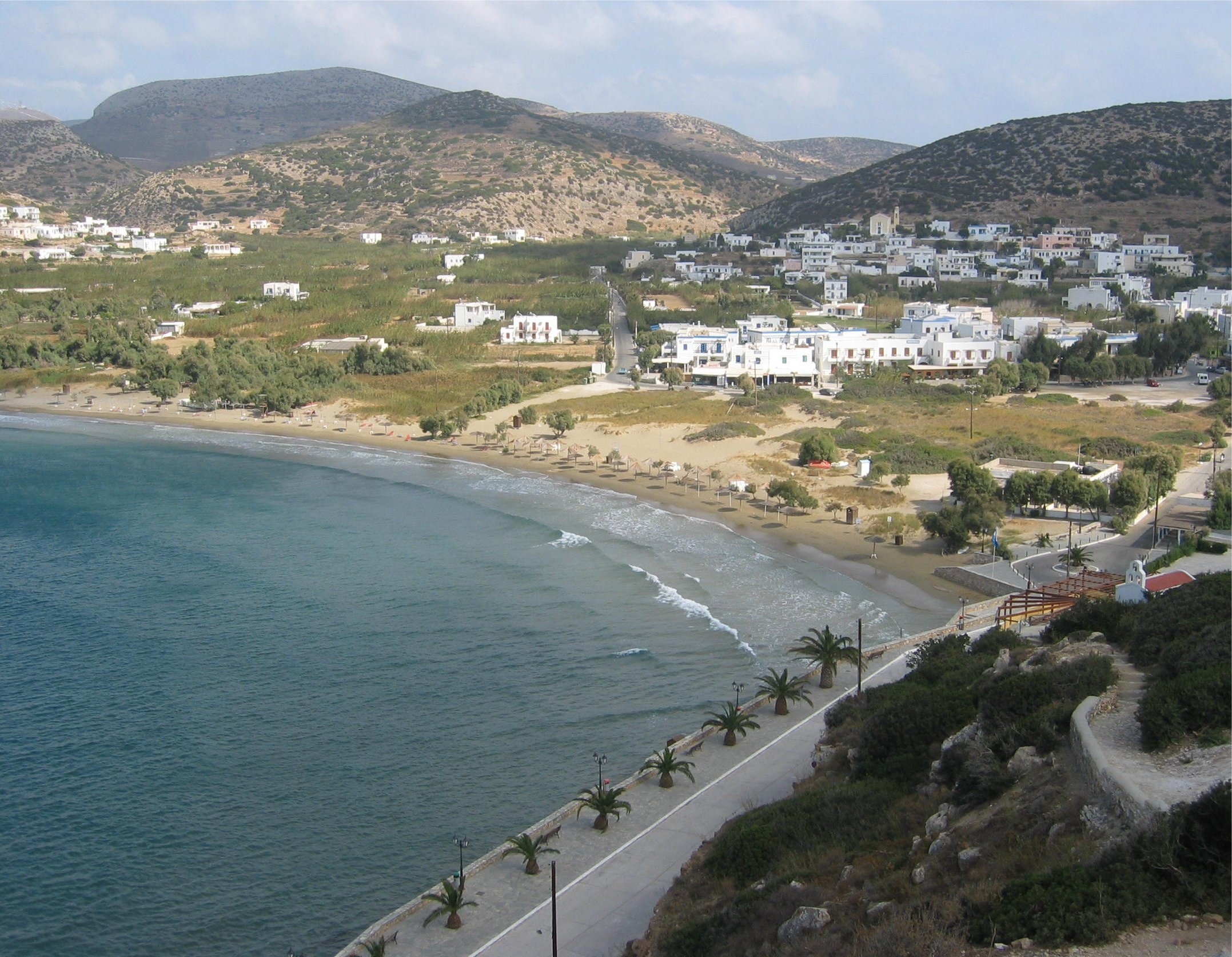
Galissas beach

Syros is a separate regional unit of the South Aegean region. The only municipality of the regional unit is Syros-Ermoupoli. As a part of the 2011 Kallikratis government reform, the regional unit Syros was created out of part of the former Cyclades Prefecture. At the same reform, the municipality Syros-Ermoupoli was created out of the 3 former municipalities:

- Ermoupoli
- Ano Syros
- Poseidonia

The municipality also includes the uninhabited island Gyaros and several other islets. The total area of the municipality is 101.90 km^{2} (39 sq mi).

=== Province ===
The province of Syros (Greek: Επαρχία Σύρου, romanized: Eparchía Sýrou) was one of the provinces of the Cyclades Prefecture. Its territory corresponded with that of the current regional units Syros and Mykonos. It was abolished in 2006.

== Religion ==
As in the rest of Greece, Syros has Eastern Orthodox churches. Metamorphosis is the most important Orthodox church on the island, Kimisis tis Theotokou is also significant and noted for the fact that it hosts a masterpiece by painter El Greco. There is also an equal number of Catholic Church buildings on the island and some entirely Catholic villages; thus, it is one of the most significant places for the Catholic Church in Greece. Syros is one of a few places where Catholics and Orthodox share a common date for Easter, which in Syros' case, is the Orthodox date.

The Catholic diocese numbers 9000 worshippers, 21 secular priests and 8 regulars, 7 parishes, 7 churches with a resident priest, 3 without a priest, and 57 chapels. The Capuchins and Jesuits each have an establishment; the Sisters of Charity, 2 houses, one of which is a hospital; the Sisters of St Joseph of the Apparition have a boarding school and St George, a De La Salle Public School.

There is also a single church of the Greek Byzantine Catholic Church which is not part of the diocese but subject to the Byzantine Exarchate of Greece.

== Cuisine ==
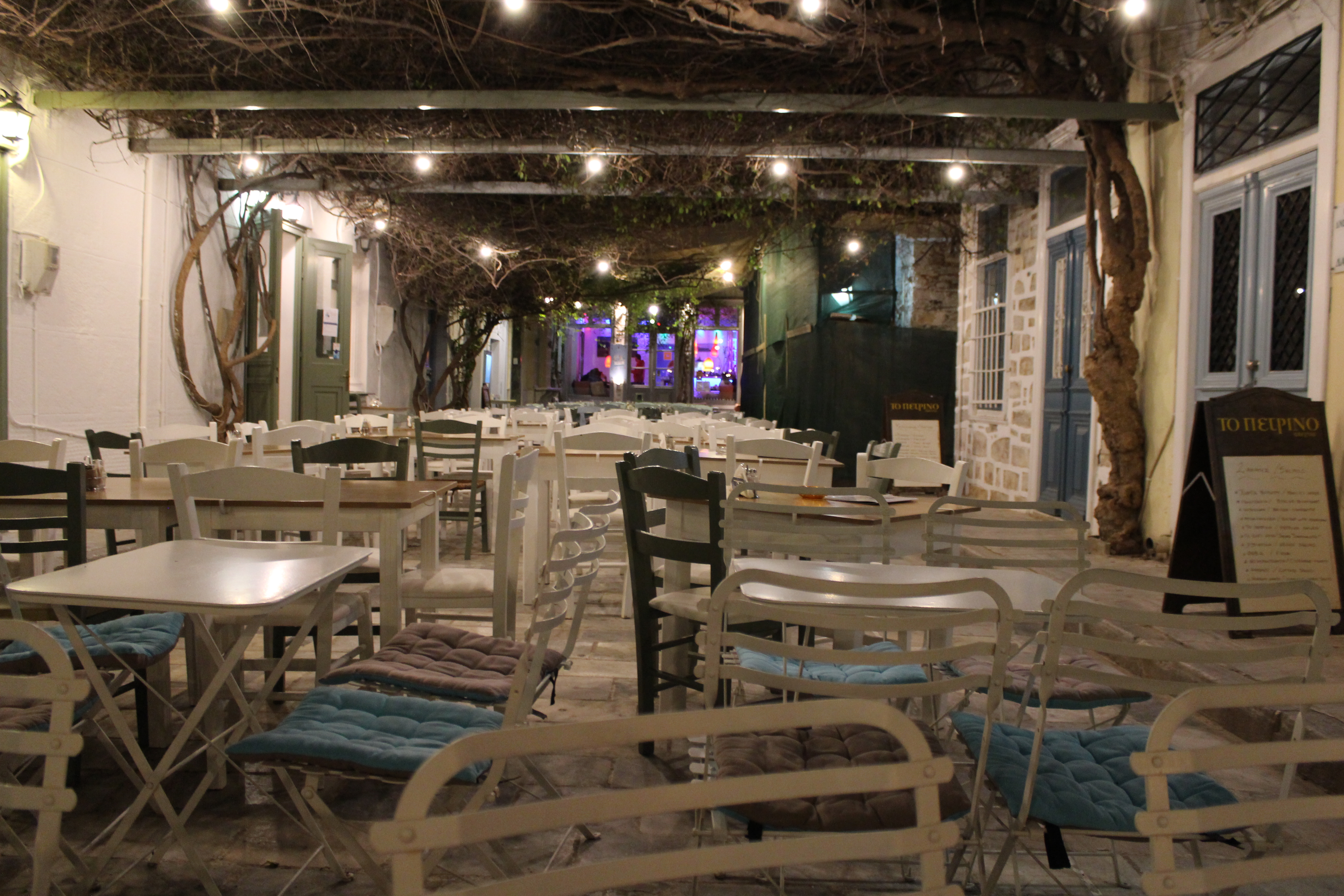
Restaurant, Ermoupoli

Local specialities of the island include:

- Kaparosalata (salad with capers)
- Maidanosalata (salad with parsley)
- Frisoura (appetizer)
- Ladopita
- Marathopita
- Tomatokeftedes (fried tomato balls)
- Kalamari gemistó (stuffed grilled squid)
- Sfougato
- San Michali cheese
- Loukoumi (dessert)
- Halvadopita (dessert)
- Pastelaria (dried figs dessert)

== Sports ==
- Hellas Syros, football
- Foinikas Syros V.C., volleyball
- Aris Syros, basketball/volleyball
- Athletic Club Syros, basketball/football
- Syros Windsurfing School
- Komito Watersports

== Airport ==
Dimitrios Vikelas Airport, 3.5 kilometers southeast of Ermoupoli, is the only one on the island. Opened in 1991, it is named after the Greek businessman and writer Dimitrios Vikelas who was born in Ermoupoli. There are direct flights to Athens all year, and seasonally to Thessaloniki.

== Notable residents ==
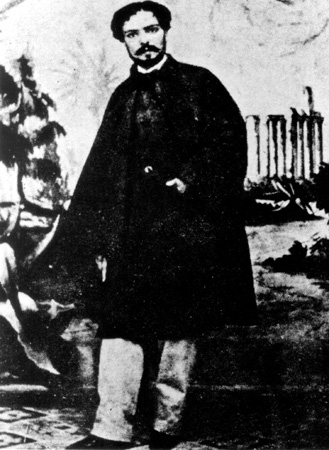
Emmanuel Rhoides

- Eumaeus, character in the Odyssey
- Pherecydes (c. 600–550 BC), philosopher
- Ioannis Andreas Kargas, Catholic bishop of Syros and martyr
- Michail Melas (1833–1897), Greek politician and merchant, father to Pavlos Melas
- Demetrius Vikelas (1835–1908), writer and the first president of the International Olympic Committee
- Emmanuel Roidis (1836–1904), writer and journalist
- Stamata Revithi (1866–?), the first woman to compete in the Olympic Games and run the Marathon
- Antonio Gregorio Vuccino (Voutsinos) A.A. (1891–1968), Archbishop of Corfu, Zante and Cefalonia, Greece
- Anna Kalouta (el) (1918–2010), actress
- Markos Vamvakaris (1905–1972), musician
- Rita Boumi-Pappa (1906–1984), poet and translator
- Anargyros Printezis (1937–2012), titular bishop of Gratianopolis and Apostolic Exarch of the Byzantine Rite Catholics in Greece
- Olga Broumas (1949–), poet and translator
- Stelios Mainas (1957–), actor
- Georgios Printezis (1985–), professional basketball player

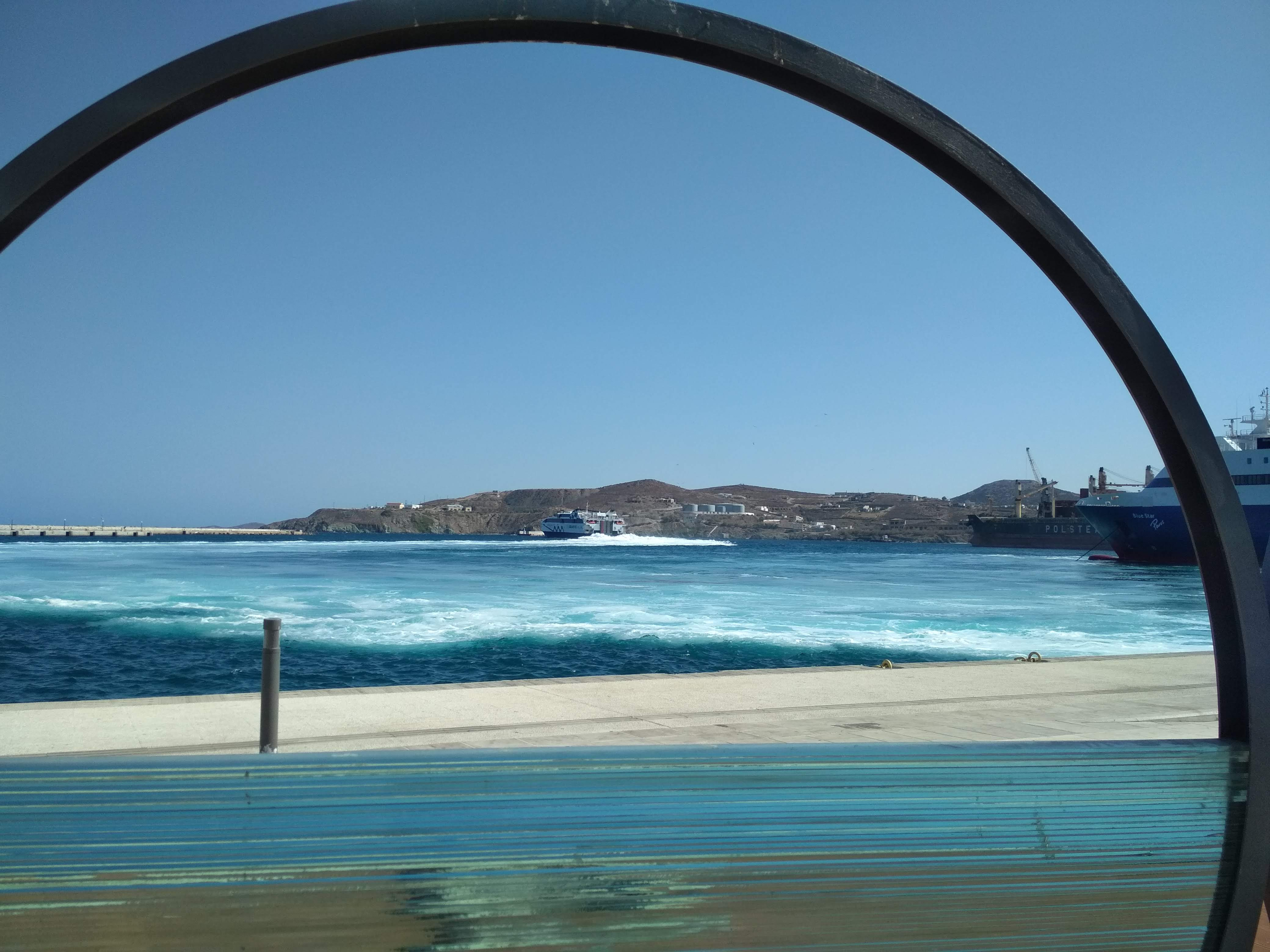
Port

== Gallery ==
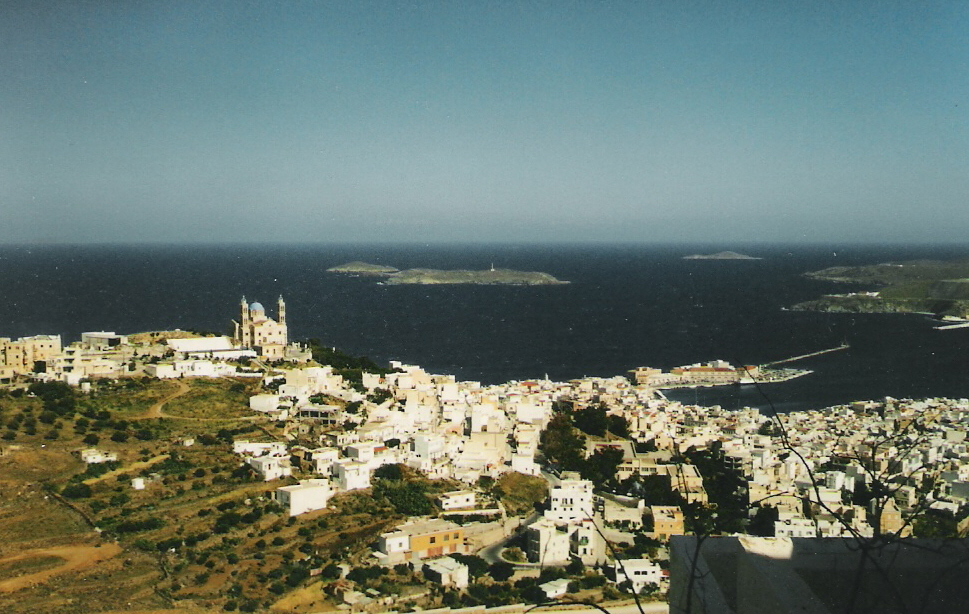
Ermoupolis, Syros from above

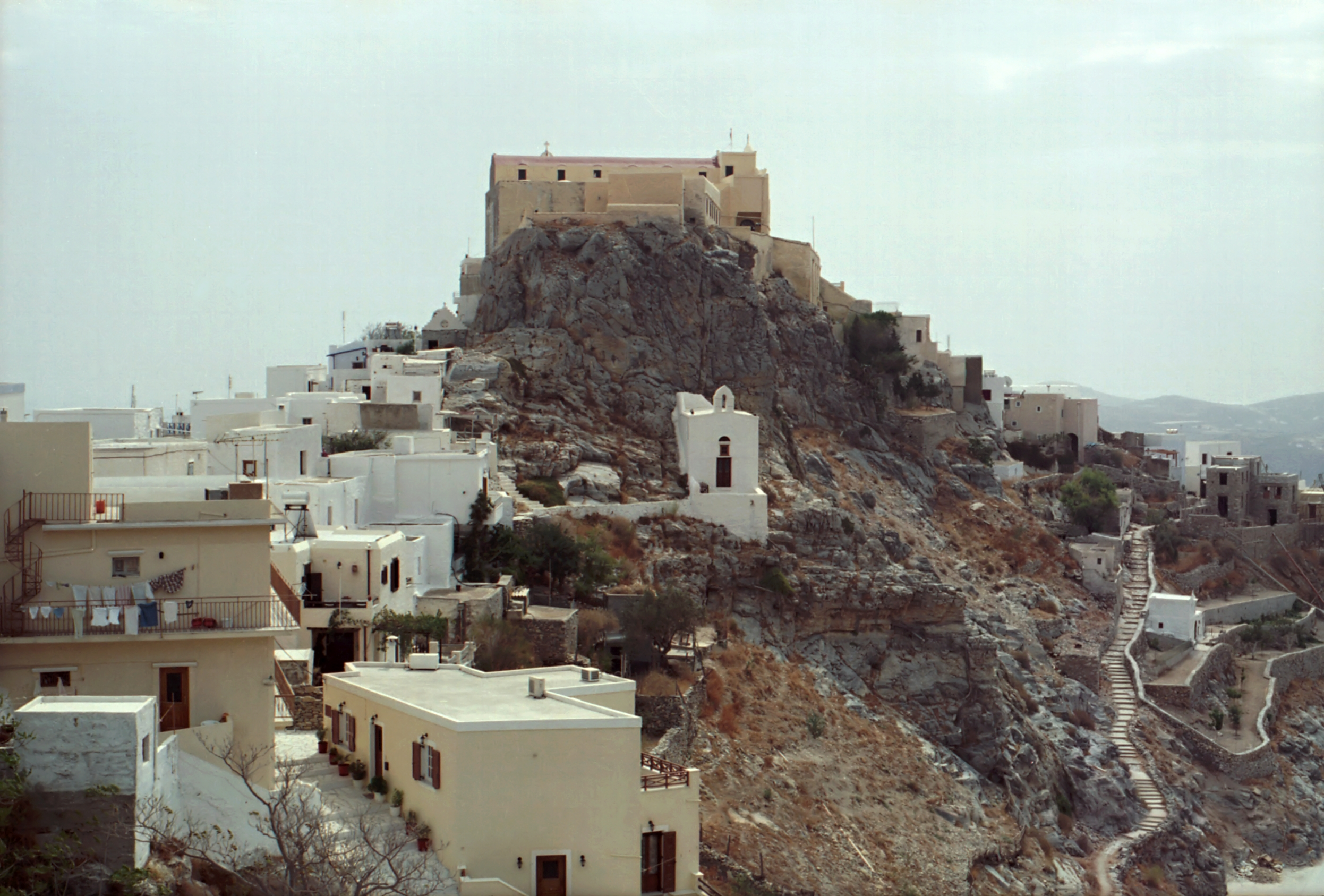
Ano Syros, Catholic quarter

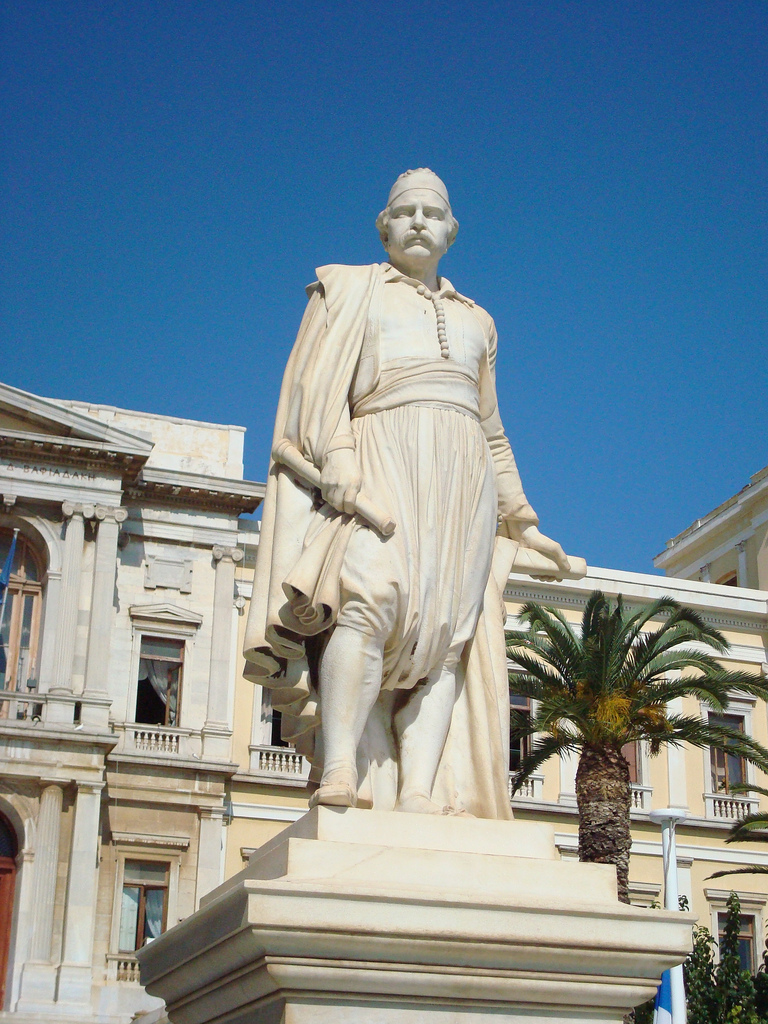
Statue of Andreas Miaoulis

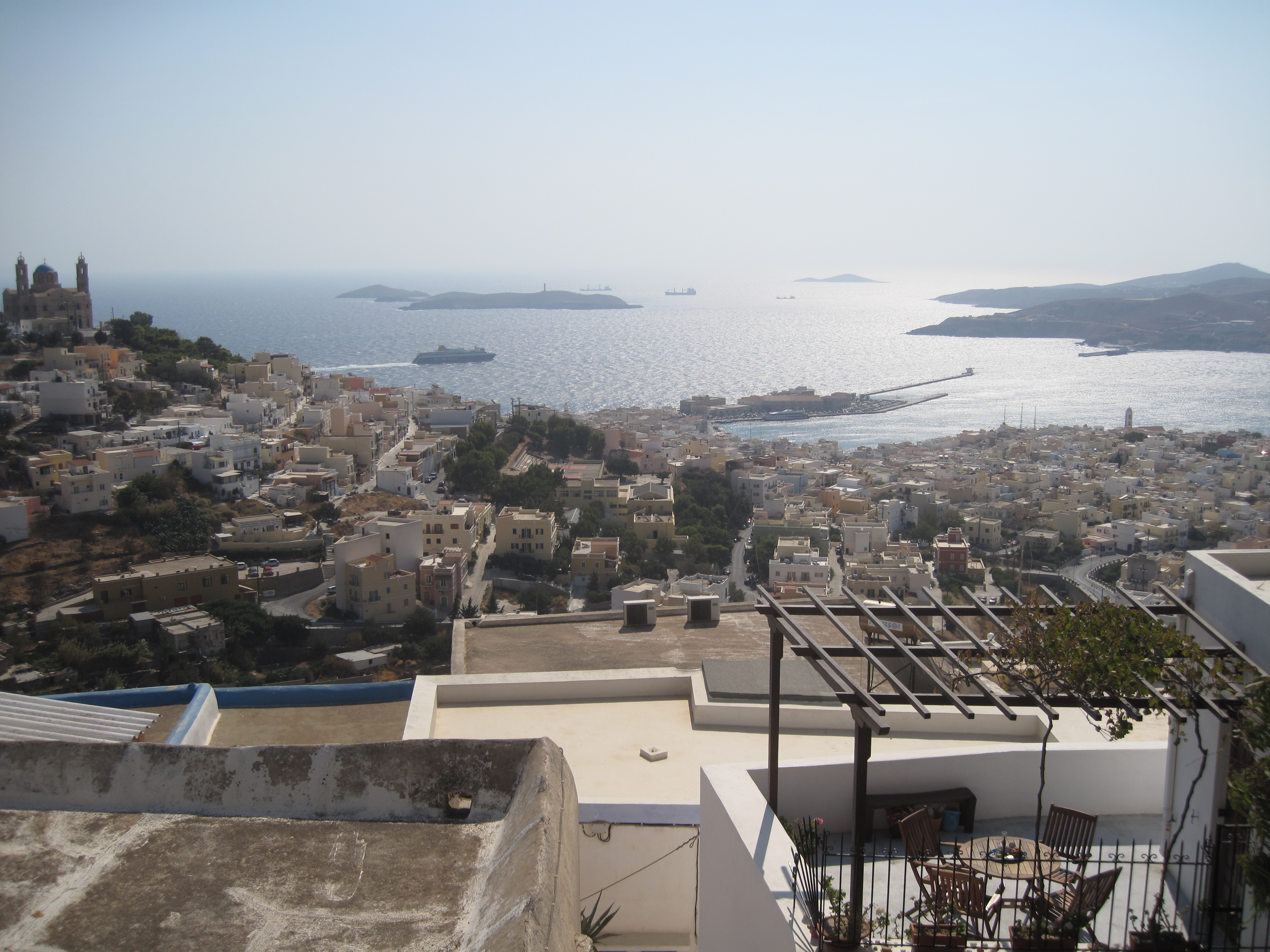
View from Ano Syros

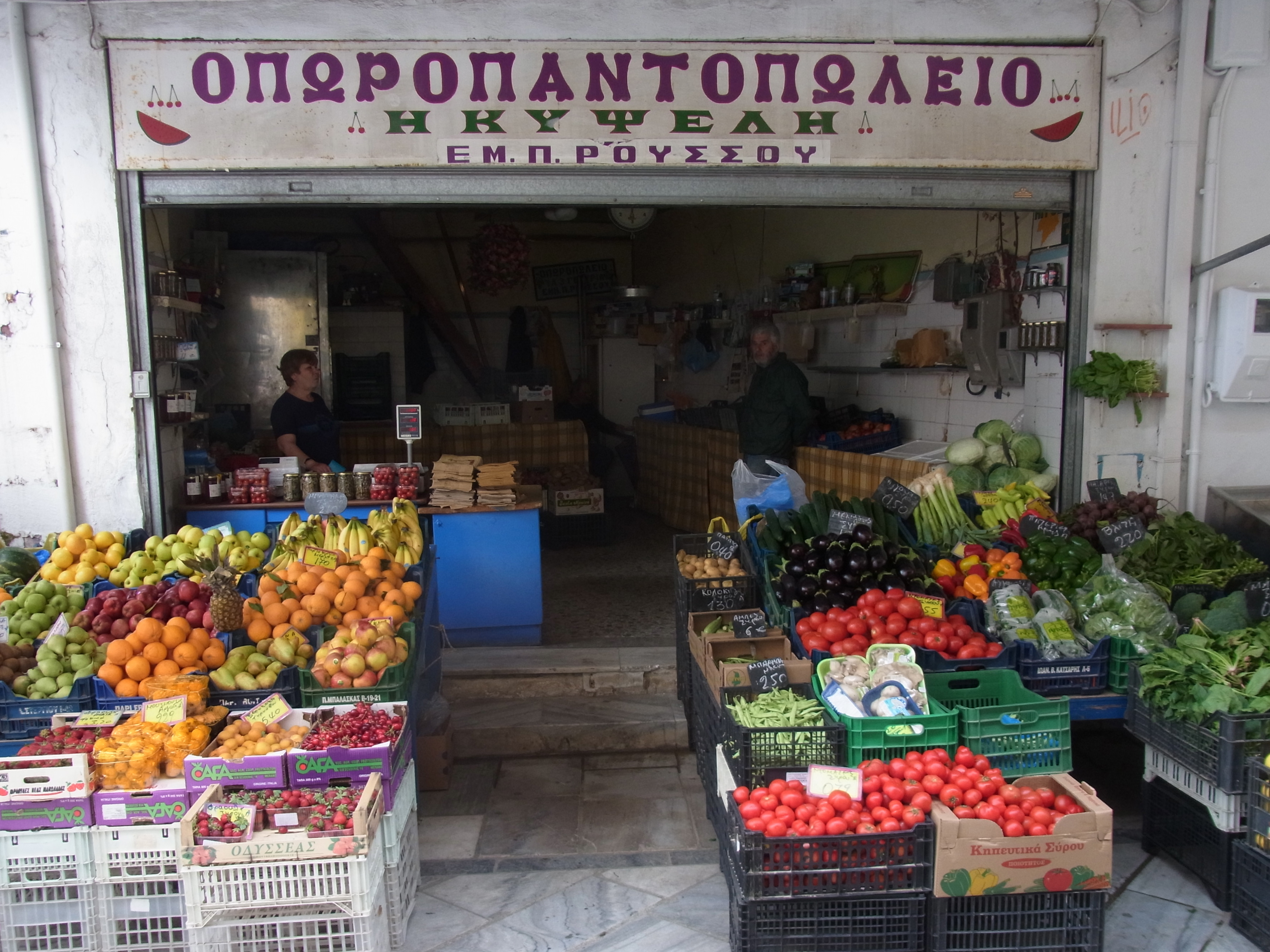
Ermoupoli market shop

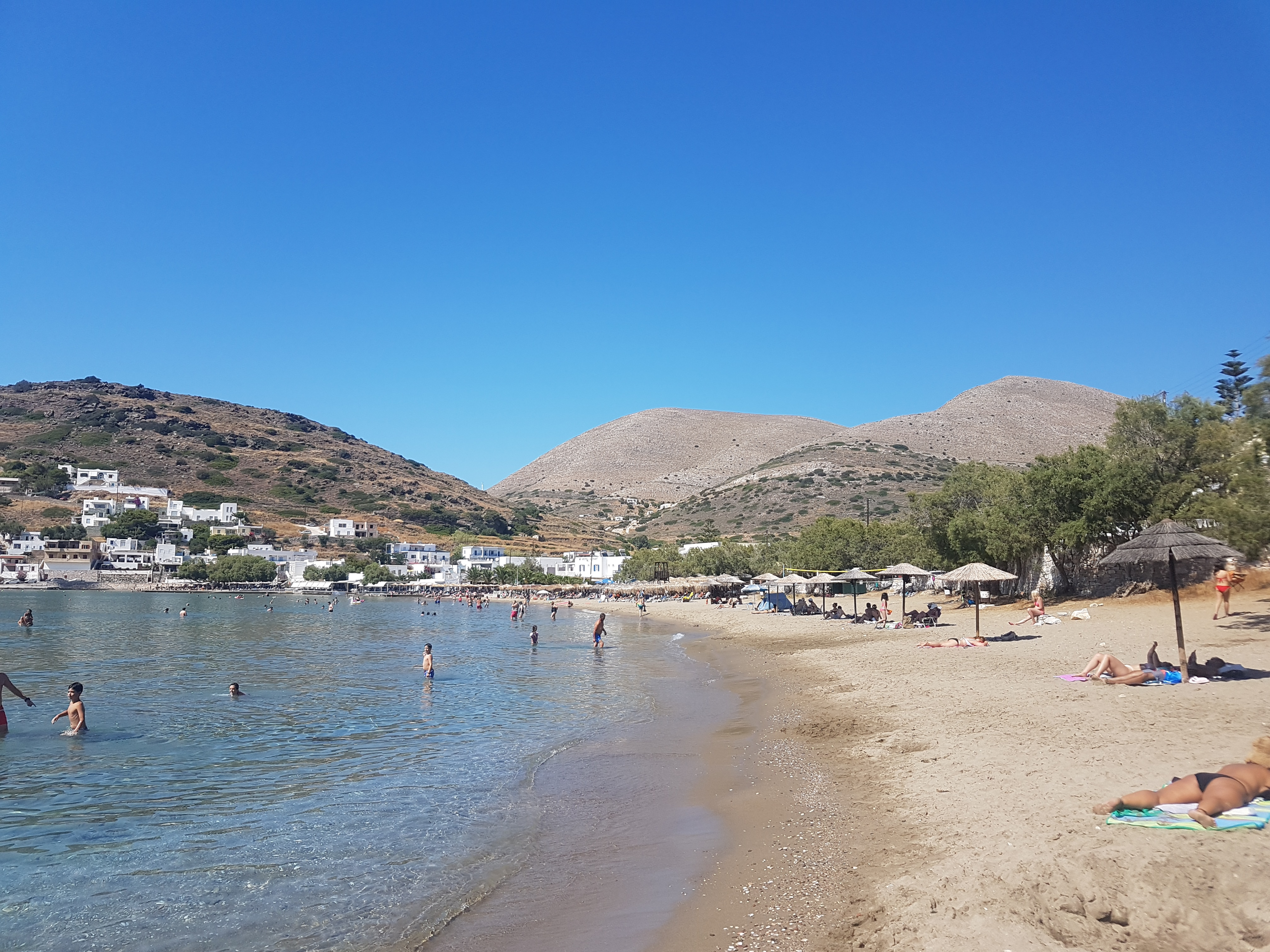
Kini beach

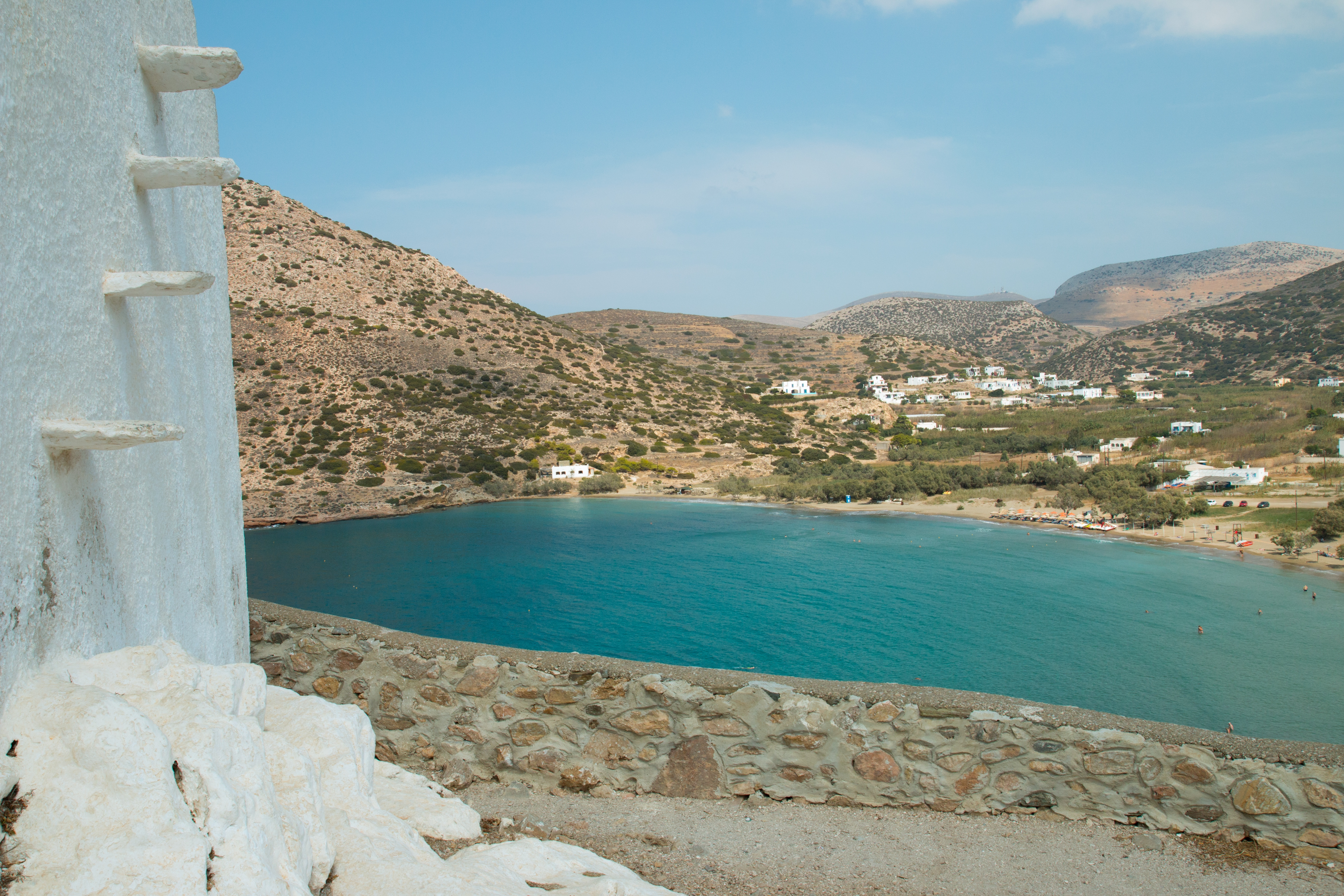
Galissas from Agia Pakou chapel

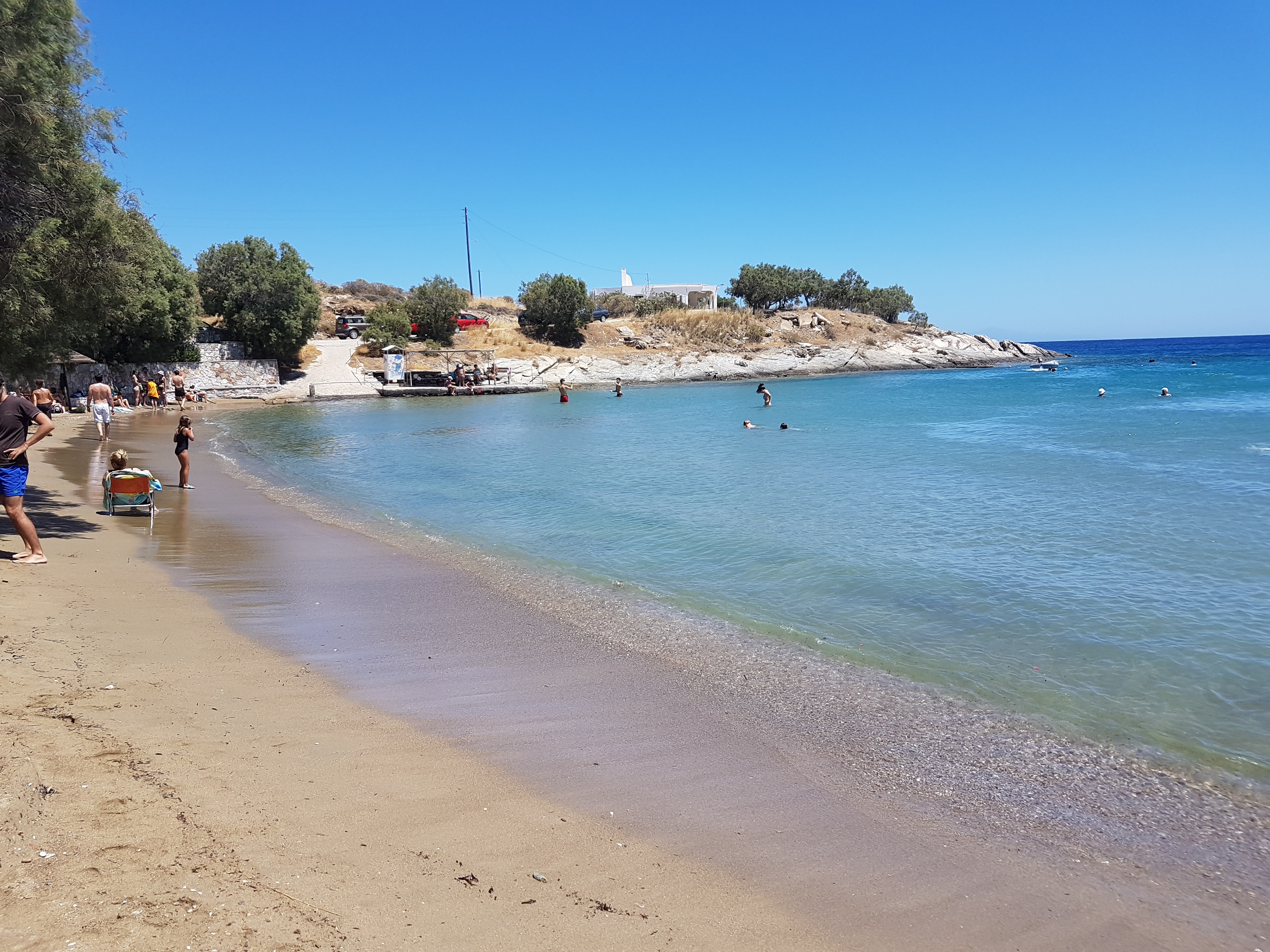
Megas Gyalos

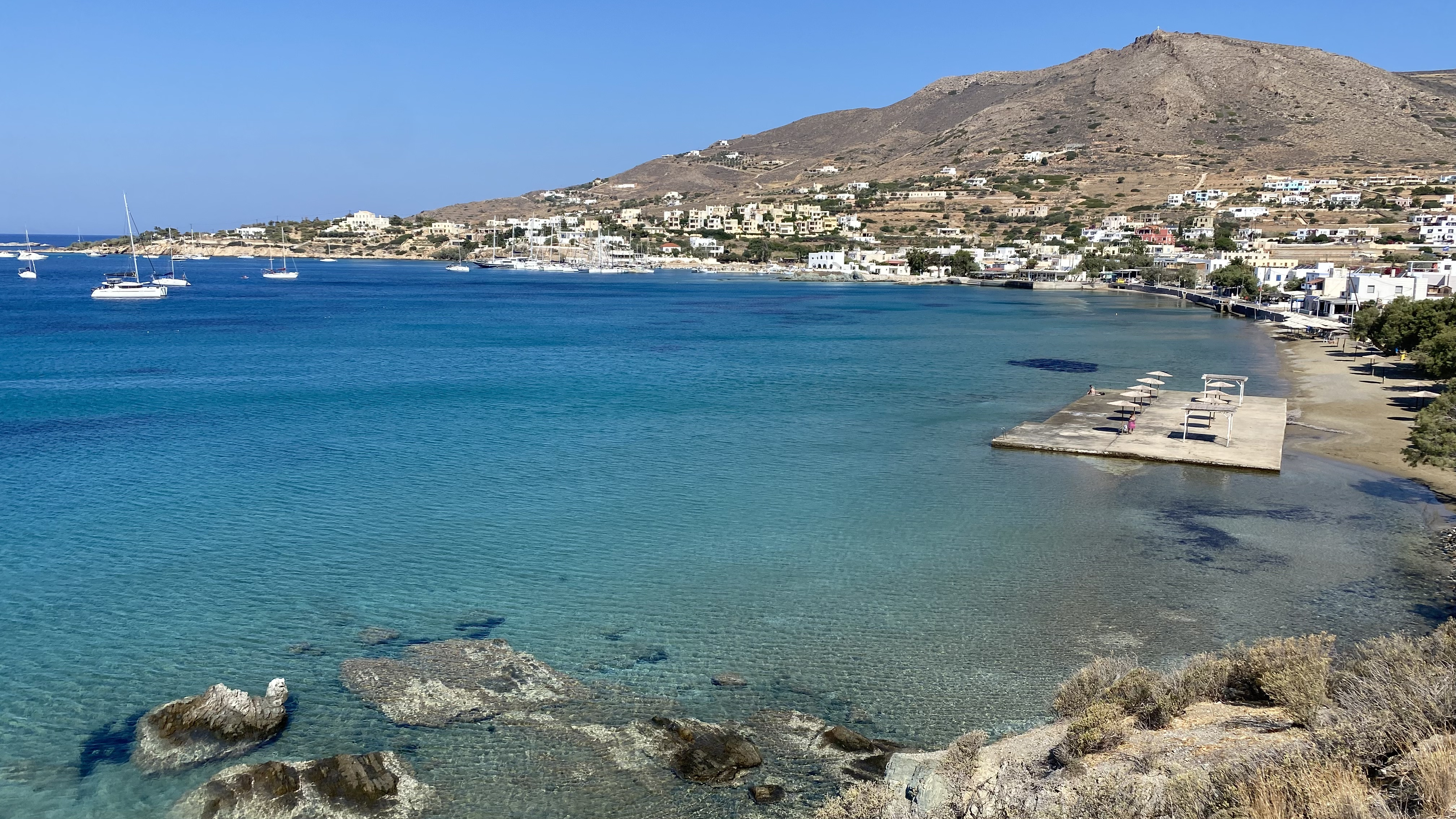
Foinikas

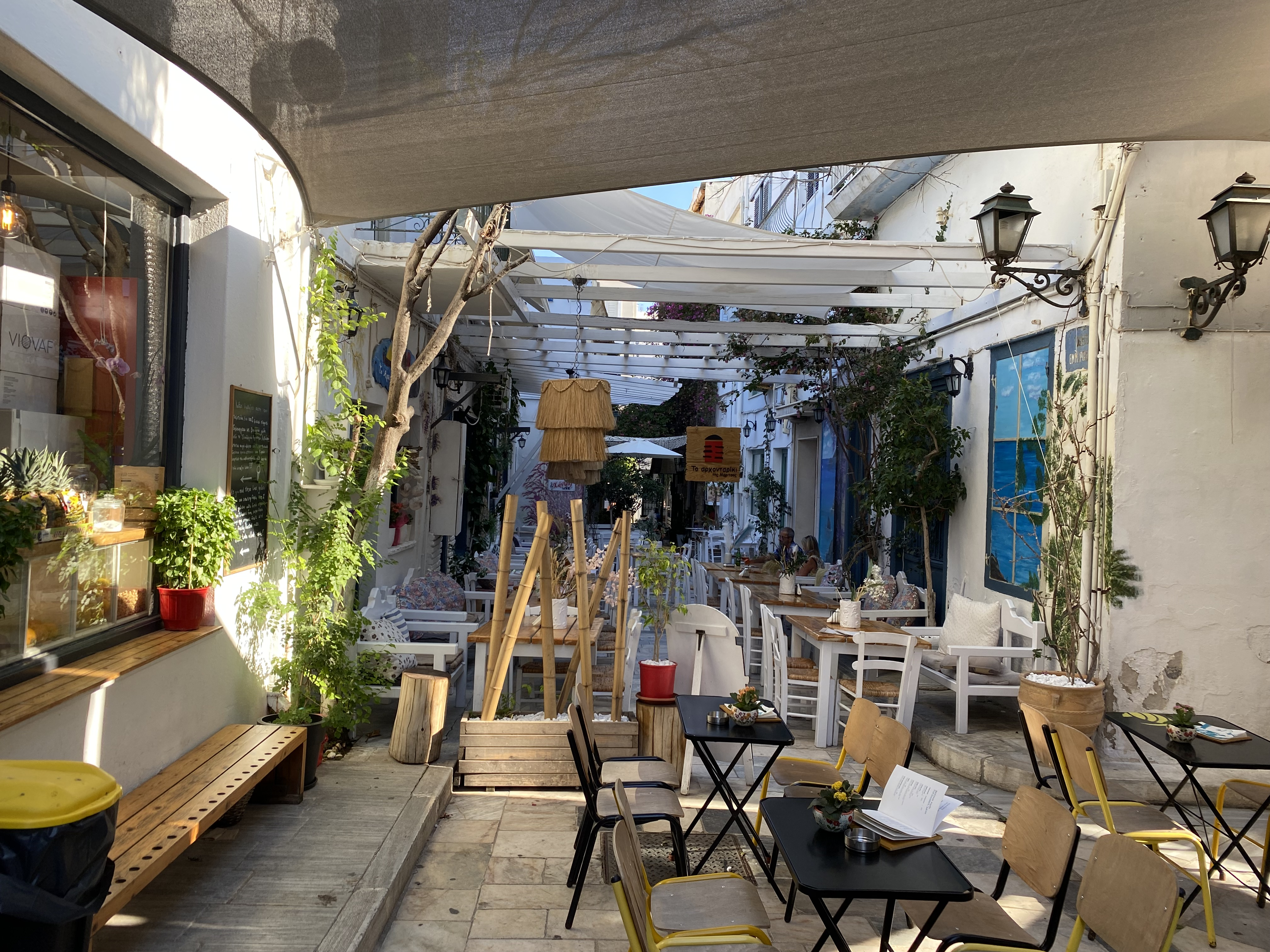
Al fresco dining in Ermoupoli

== See also ==
- List of islands of Greece
