= Galessus =

Coordinates: 37°25′12″N 24°52′30″E

Galessus or Galessos (Ancient Greek: Γαλήσσος) was an ancient town on the island of Syros.

Its site is located near Galissas.
