= Azolimnos Syros =

Coordinates: 37°24′37″N 24°57′50″E

Azolimnos Αζόλιμνος
- Settlement
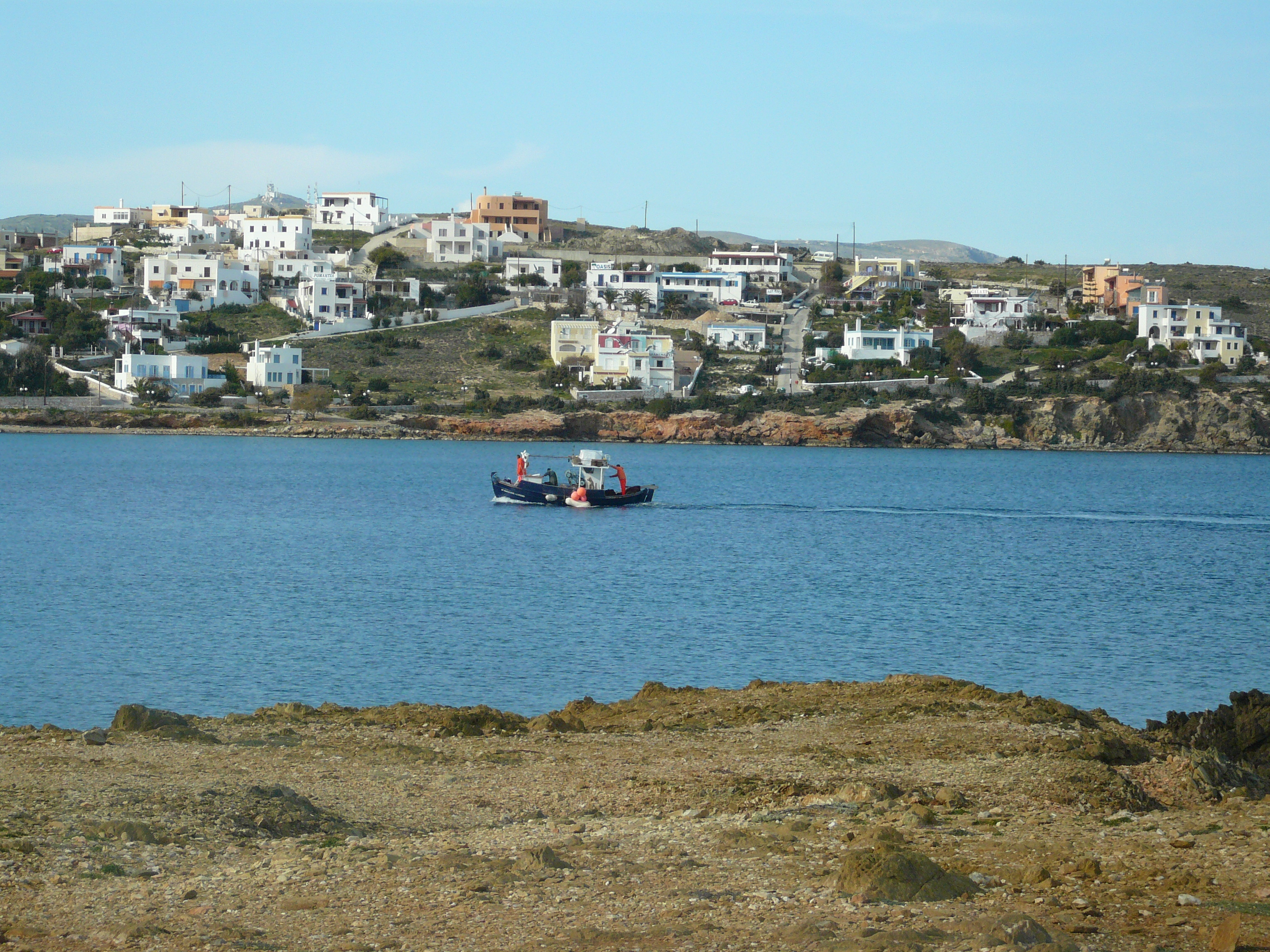
- Interactive map of Azolimnos
- Country: Greece
- Time zone: UTC+2 (EET)
  - Summer (DST): UTC+3 (EEST)

Azolimnos Syros is a village on the southeast coast of the Greek island of Syros. Syros belongs to the Cyclades island group. Azolimnos is 6 km from the Syros capital, Ermoupoli. Azolimnos beach is a popular destination for summer holiday makers wishing to go swimming.

== History ==
See History of Syros

A 1905 sessional paper of the House of Commons of the United Kingdom, mentions the Société Anonyme Hellènique de poudres et produits chimiques of Athens having purchased and updated a gun powder and explosives plant at Azolimnos. It sourced raw materials from Genoa and Hamburg. The factory was able to produce one ton of powder per day. The 1907 volume of Kelly's Directory also lists the company but by 1920, the factory is noted to have not been in production for some time.

== Geography ==
The village rests on schist, a scaly textured metamorphic rock.

== Beach ==
The beach is in a bay with a sea edge of small rocks and sand. Tamarisk trees offer some shade. The small road behind the beach has vendors of snacks, beverages, essentials and items for rent for beach activities. A harbour wall extends into the bay.

== Services ==
There is a taverna which offers Syros specialties including cuttlefish. There are a handful of small hotels and places to stay.

The Analipsi catholic chapel is dedicated to the Ascension of Christ. Its patronal festival takes place at Trinity Sunday and lasts for two days. There is another feast day each August where visitors can purchase traditional sweets from the Azolimnos cultural society. A second Catholic church near Azolimnos is Agios Franghiskos Assizis Church, dedicated to Francis of Assisi. Its patronal day is 4 October.

== Transport ==
Azolimnos is accessed by a narrow road from the nearby village of Vari or by a wider road approaching the village from the north. The beach can be approached by small boat.
