= Diocese of Syros and Milos =

Roman Catholic diocese in Greece

Coordinates: 37.4511°N 24.9353°E

Diocese of Syros e Milos Dioecesis Syrensis et Milensis Greek: Ἐπισκοπή Σύρου και Μήλου

Catholic
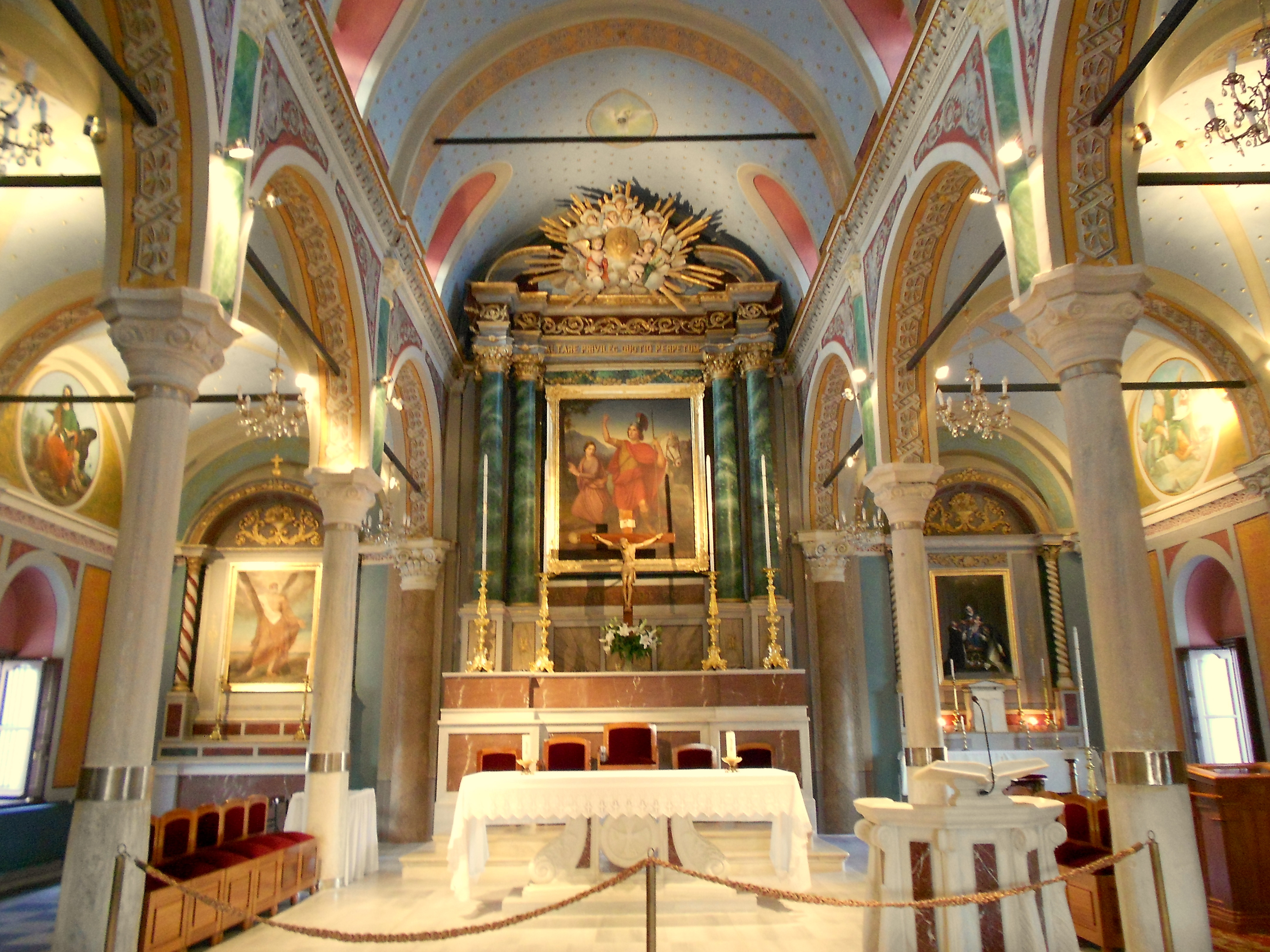
- View of the interior of Saint George's Cathedral in Ano Syros

Location
- Country: Greece
- Ecclesiastical province: Naxos, Andros, Tinos and Mykonos
- Metropolitan: Naxos, Andros, Tinos and Mykonos

Statistics
- Area: 633 km^{2} (244 sq mi)
- Population: Total; Catholics: (as of 2010); 31,302; 6,831 (21.8%)

Information
- Sui iuris church: Latin Church
- Rite: Latin Rite
- Established: 13th century
- Cathedral: St. George's Cathedral, Ano Syros

Current leadership
- Pope: Leo XIV
- Bishop: Georgios Altouvas
- Bishops emeritus: Petros Stefanou

The Diocese of Syros and Milos (Latin: Dioecesis Syrensis et Milensis) is a Latin Church diocese of the Roman Catholic Church located in the cities of Syros and Milos in the ecclesiastical province of Naxos, Andros, Tinos and Mykonos in Greece.

== History ==
The diocese was established in 1400 as Diocese of Syros–Milos.

Caritas Syros, founded in 1986 is the official arm for pastoral care, charity and social support of the Roman Catholic Diocese of Syros. It is a member of the national Caritas Hellas.

== Ordinaries ==
=== Bishops of Syros ===
1. Agostino Gisolfi, OP (23 September 1592 – 1607)
2. Giovanni Andrea Garga, OP (30 July 1607 – 2 October 1617)
3. Giovanni Girardi, OFM (7 January 1619 – 1624)
4. Domenico Marengo, OFM (27 October 1625 – 1645)
5. Giovanni Mihele de Curtis, O Carm (6 May 1647 – June 1655)
6. Giuseppe Guarchi (2 August 1655 – 1690)
7. Antonio Giustiniani (8 February 1694 – 24 January 1701)
8. Michele Caro (12 February 1703 – 18 September 1707)
9. Nicolaus de Camillis (7 May 1710 – 1710)
10. Nicola Portoghese, OFM (1 October 1710 – 1727)
11. Giovanni Francesco Bossi, OFM Conv (28 November 1729 – 22 November 1730)
12. Antonio Maturi, OFM (21 May 1731 – 13 April 1733)
13. Emmanuel Caranza (13 April 1733 – June 1734)
14. Dario de Longhis (25 May 1735 – 27 July 1748)
15. Antonio Maturi, OFM (21 July 1749 – October 1750)
16. Giacinto Giustiniani, OP (15 May 1752 – 29 May 1786)
17. Giovanni Battista Fonton, OFM Conv (24 July 1786 – 16 March 1799)
18. Ioannes Baptistus Russin (5 October 1800 – 14 September 1824)
19. Luigi Maria Blancis da Ciriè, OFM Ref (15 March 1830 – 30 October 1851)
20. Giuseppe Maria Alberti (30 October 1851 – 18 March 1880)
21. Teofilo Massucci, OFM Ref (1 October 1880 – 18 February 1895)
22. Theodoros Antonios Politos (27 March 1895 – 11 June 1901)
23. Dominikos Darmanin (18 June 1901 – 4 March 1912)
24. Antonios Makrionitis (2 July 1912 – 9 December 1936)
25. Antonio Grigorios Voutsinos, (9 June 1937 – 29 May 1947)
26. Georges Xenopulos, SJ (22 February 1947 – 27 June 1974)
27. Frangkiskos Papamanolis, OFM Cap (27 June 1974 – 13 May 2014)
28. Petros Stefanou, SJ (13 May 2014 – 11 April 2025)
29. Apostolic Administrator Sevastianos Rossolatos (11 April 2025 – 31 October 2026), Archbishop emeritus
30. Georgios Altouvas (since 28 August 2026)

== See also ==
- Catholic Church in Greece
- List of churches in Greece
