= Ioannis Andreas Kargas =

Greek Catholic bishop

Ioannis Andreas Kargas (Greek: Ιωάννης Ανδρέας Κάργας, Italian: Giovanni Andrea Carga; died on 2 October 1617) was a Catholic bishop of the Roman Catholic Diocese of Syros and Milos from 1607 to 1617. During the invasion of the Turks in 1617, under the leadership of the Kapudan Pasha Çelebi Ali, Kargas was captured and hanged. His name has been given to the street that leads to the stairs of Ano Syros.
