= Ano Syros =

Ano Syros Άνω Σύρος
- Municipal unit
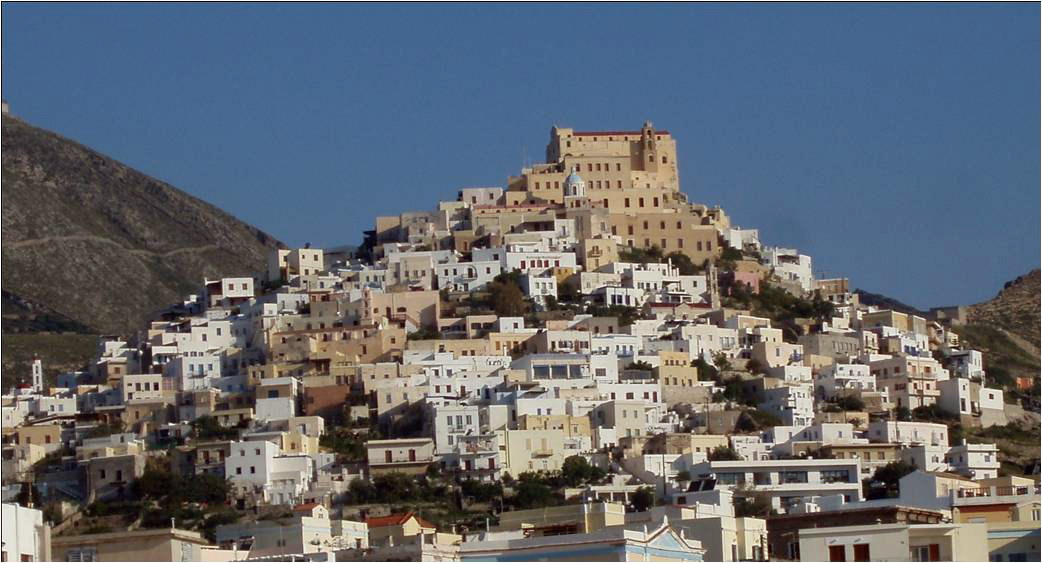
- General view of Ano Syros

- Location within the regional unit

- Location within Greece
- Coordinates: 37°28′N 24°56′E
- Country: Greece
- Administrative region: South Aegean
- Regional unit: Syros
- Municipality: Syros-Ermoupoli

Area
  - Municipal unit: 67.0 km^{2} (25.9 sq mi)

Population (2021)
  - Municipal unit: 3,611
  - Municipal unit density: 53.9/km^{2} (140/sq mi)
  - Community: 1,856
- Time zone: UTC+2 (EET)
  - Summer (DST): UTC+3 (EEST)
- Vehicle registration: EM

Ano Syros (Greek: Άνω Σύρος, “Upper Syros”) is a town and a former municipality on the island of Syros, in the Cyclades, Greece. Since the 2011 local government reform it is part of the municipality Syros-Ermoupoli, of which it is a municipal unit. The municipal unit includes the uninhabited islands Gyaros (lying to the northwest of Syros) and Varvaroúsa. Population 3,611 (2021 census); land area 67.014 square kilometres (25.874 square miles). The municipal unit shares the island of Sýros with the municipal units of Ermoupoli and Poseidonia.

== History ==
Ano Syros is the medieval settlement of Syros. It was built during the late Byzantine era or early Frankokratia. It is a classical cycladic medieval settlement that is densely built with narrow roads, circular order and a radial street plan. Its overall landscape resembles a fortified citadel. Ano Syros is inhabited by Catholic Greeks. The reason for it is the long period of Frankokratia in Syros that started immediately after the Fourth Crusade. Frankokratia ended during the 16th century but the Catholics of Syros came under French protection and Catholicism survived in the island. After founding of nearby Hermoupolis, Ano Syros ceased to be the administrative centre of Syros. Nevertheless, the settlement remained a religious centre since it is the seat of Roman Catholic Diocese of Syros and Milos.

During WW2 the city was occupied by the Italians, who wanted to create an Italian province with administrative capital in Ano Syros:

Among the civilian population there was a substantial approval of the Italian presence only in the area of the capital of Siro and in the island of Tino, where many boasted distant Venetian roots and were numerous Catholics for centuries - especially in the town "Ano Syros", founded in 1200 by the Venetians. Ano Syros, the Catholic stronghold in Siro, supported the Italianization of the Cyclades even if moderately: this was assisted by the Italian authorities and did not suffer death from the famine that damaged the Greek population especially in February 1942. Many Catholic inhabitants of Ano Syros (and someone from Tino) were later imprisoned by the Greeks (Orthodox) with the charge of collaborationism in 1945. BD

== Places of interest ==
- Church of Saint George (Agios Georgios): This Catholic church is atop the hill of Ano Syros. It was originally built in 1208 but has been destroyed three times since and has been rebuilt.
- Capuchin monastery: It is a catholic monastery that was founded in 1637.
- Vamvakaris museum: It is a museum dedicated to Markos Vamvakaris

== Twin towns ==
Ano Syros is twinned with:

- Gołdap, Poland since 2000.
- Grillon, France since 1994.

== People ==
- Markos Vamvakaris

== Gallery ==
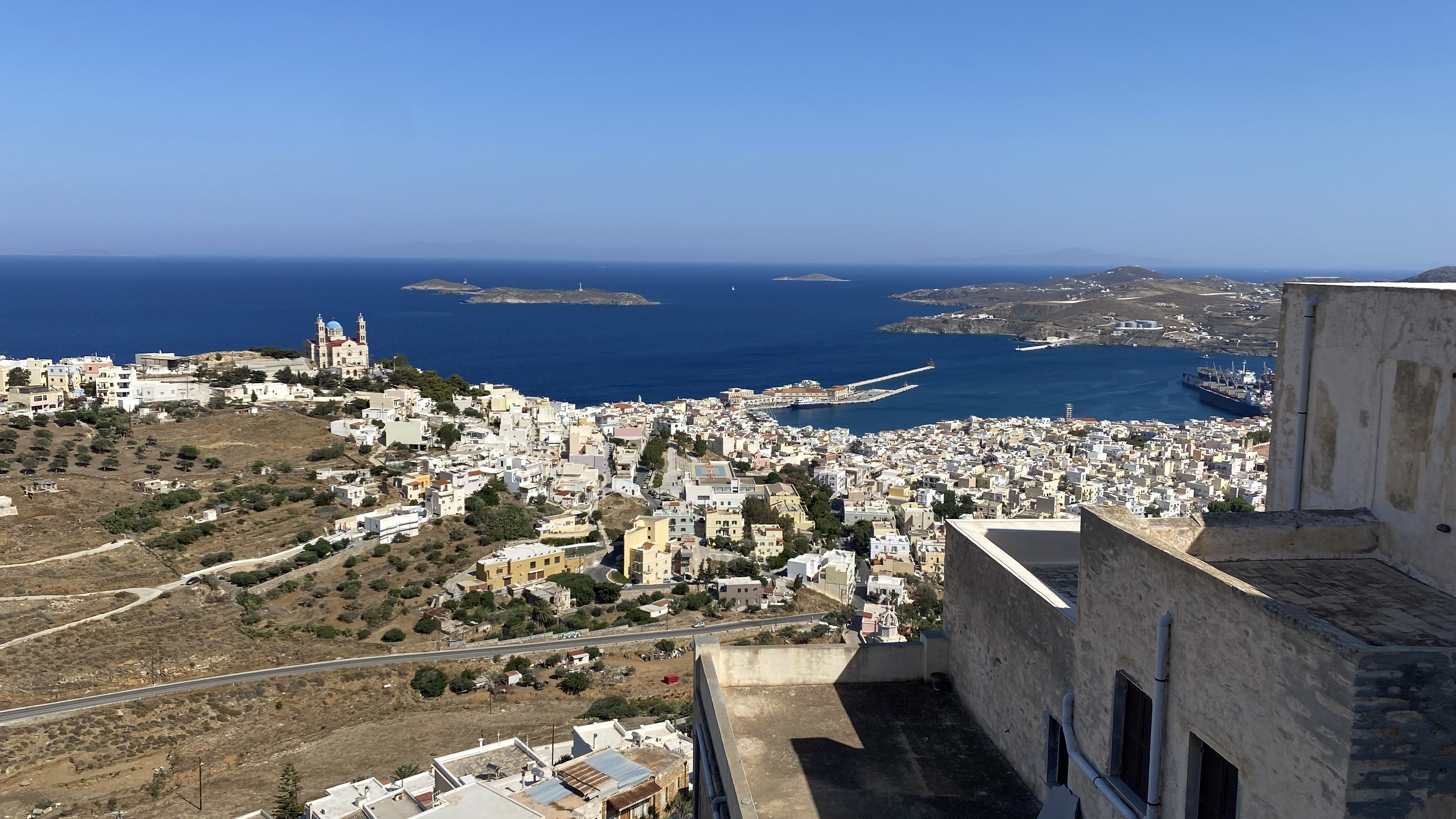
View of Ermoupoli from Ano Syros

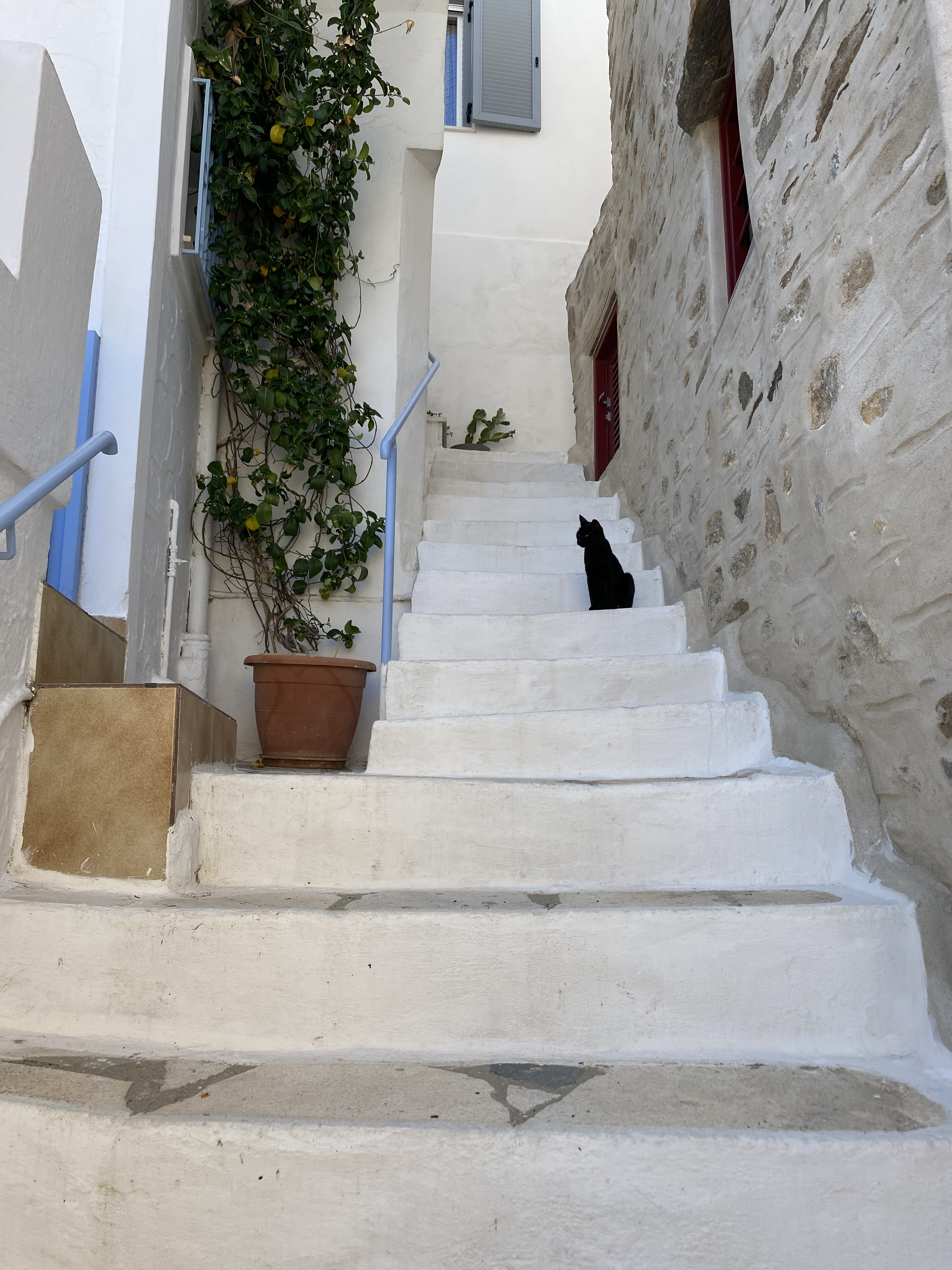
Laneway in Ano Syros

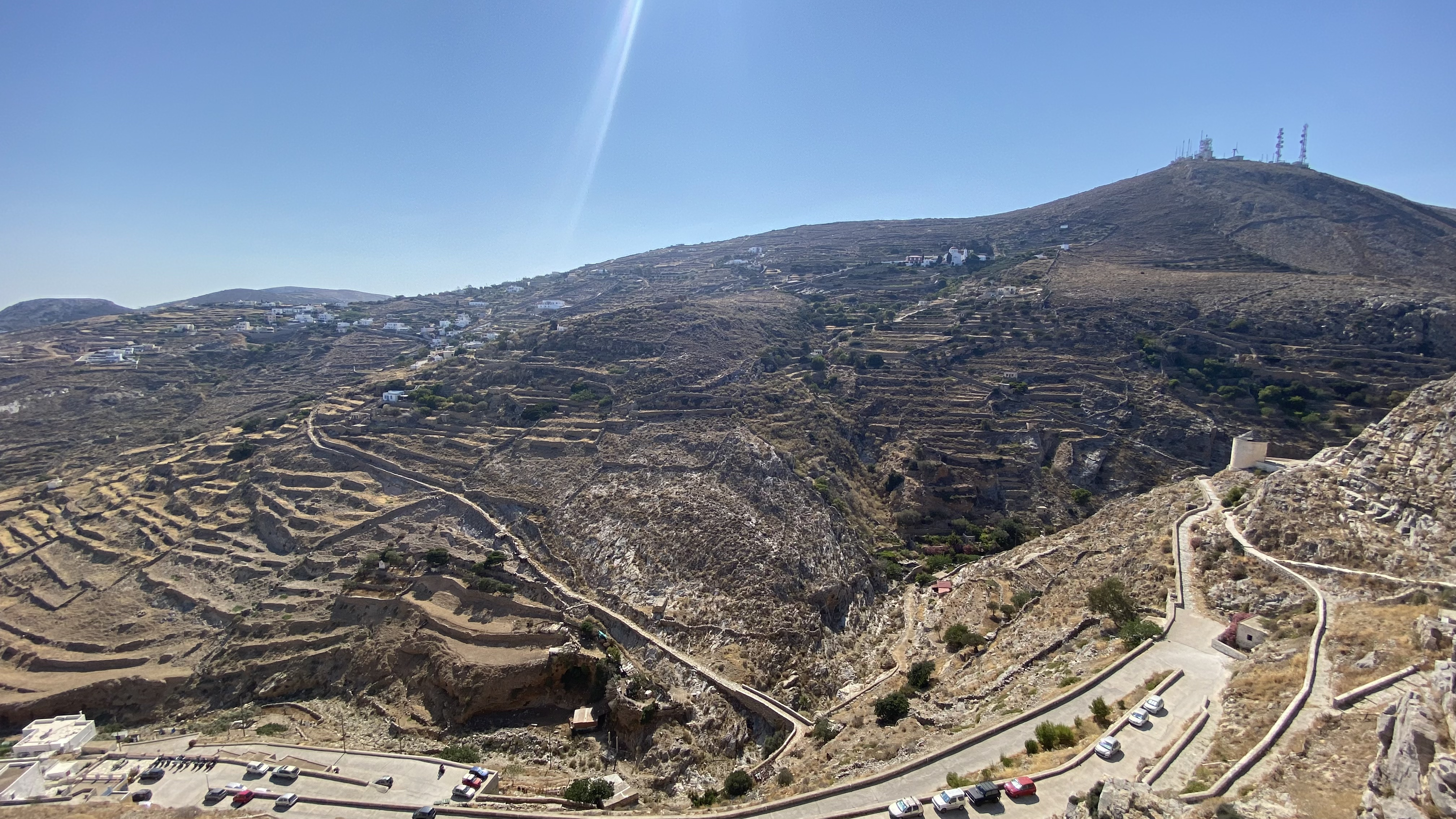
View inland from Ano Syros

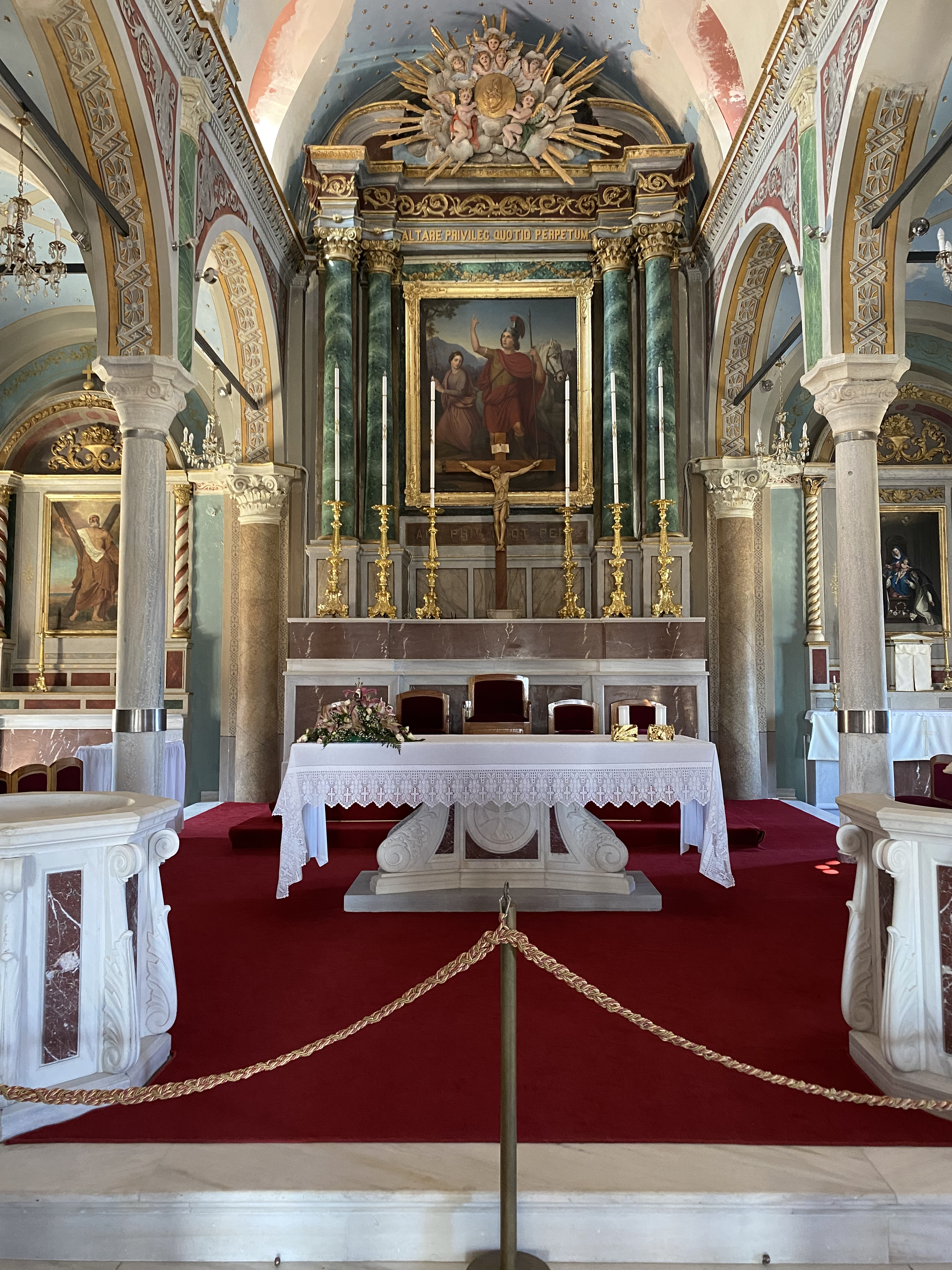
Inside the Agios Georgios Catholic Church
