= Apollon Theater, Syros =

Building in Ermoupolis, South Aegean, Greece

Coordinates: 37°26′43″N 24°56′37″E

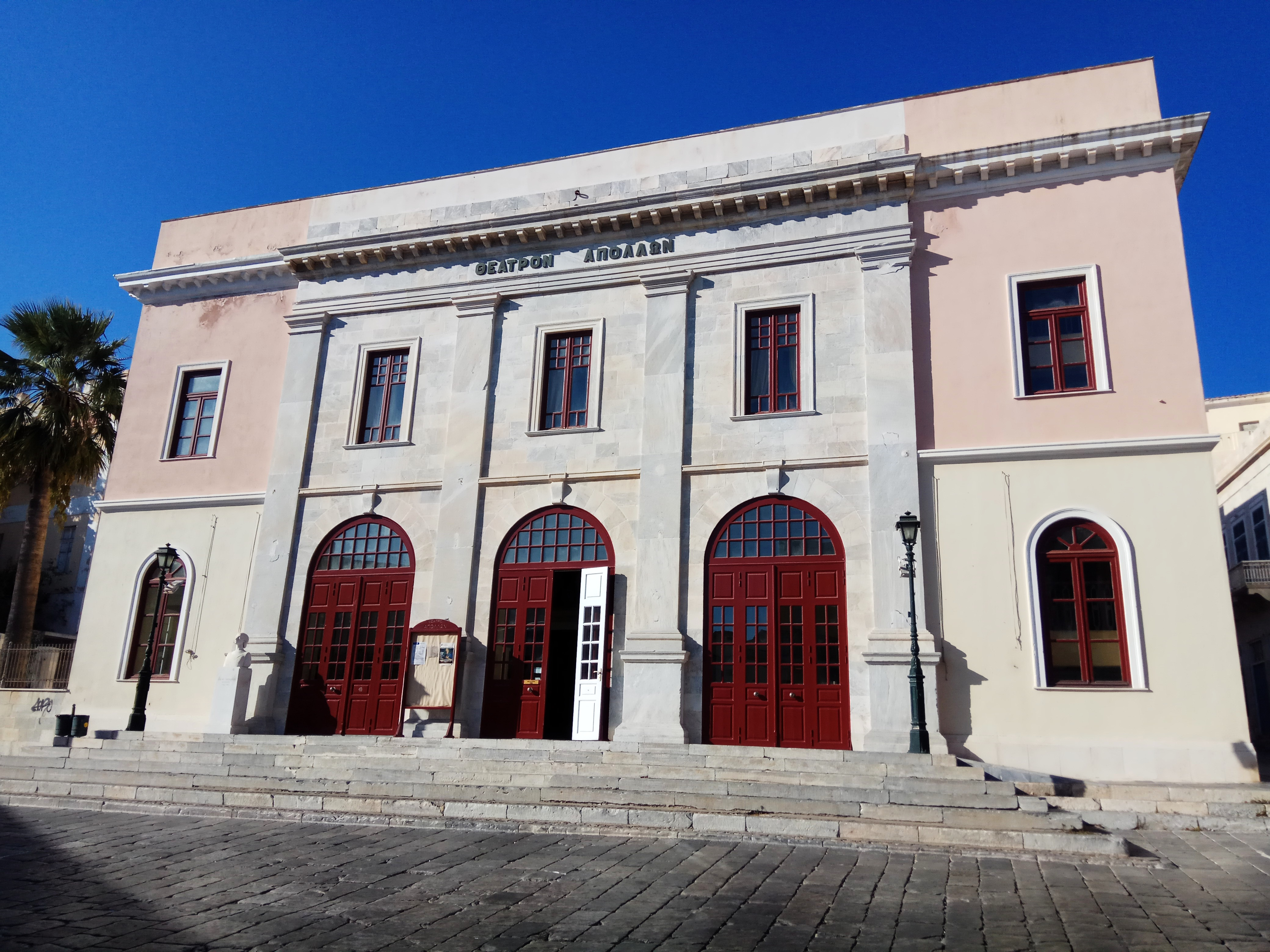
Apollon Theater

The Apollo Theater, also known as the Municipal Theater "Apollo", is a theater located in Ermoupolis on Syros in the Cyclades. A cultural icon of the city, it was built in 1862–1864 to the designs of the Italian architect Pietro Sampò and opened on 20 April 1864.

== History ==
In Ermoupoli, during the period 1830–1860 there was a great theatrical movement. On 30 October 1861, the City Council accepted the citizens' proposals and unanimously decided to build a theatre and a theater club in the central square. The construction costs of the theater were estimated at 60,000 drachmas, but in spite of controversy, a permanent roof replaced the wooden warehouses, clubs and cafes of Ermoupoli which had sheltered players since 1828. It was received with relief from the theater-loving public. Construction began at the end of 1862, close to the Miaouli Square, supervised by the architect Pietro Sambo who then worked as an architect in the town hall of Ermoupolis.

On 20 April 1864, it was opened in the presence of Michalis Salvagos. The first performances were, following the opening night's Rigoletto, four melodramas: La favorita, La traviata, the Survivors and the Cobblers, played by an Italian company.

In April 1866, the theater was given to a Greek theater company, the Hellenic Drama Society, a move which, in a letter dated 22 February 1866, Ragavis (as chairman of the National Theater Committee) had recommended to the Apollo Theater Committee.

The building underwent major overhauls in 1874, 1881, 1890 (seats and scene) and 1896 (general).

After the construction of the new building, the development of the theatrical movement continued, following the prosperity of the city. The theater bloomed throughout the interwar period and the greatest names of modern Greek theater appeared on its stage.

=== Wartime damage ===
During the Second World War, the theater suffered disasters which necessitated post-war interventions, altering the building's appearance. During the Greco-Italian War, the theatre was being used as a cinema. During the following years, it was never brought back to its original condition, although after the war there were some theatrical performances, with the lead of Marika Kotopouli, who gave on 24 March 1953 the last performance of her career.

The Apollo Theater was considered unsuitable for operation. In 1959, the municipality decided to renovate it. General repair began in 1970 and caused an internal damage. The wooden vaults were replaced with concrete balconies. The activities of the "Syros Apollon Theatrical Club" (founded in 1977) and "Souris Artistic Group" (1978), which showed films in the theater to stimulate the interest of the public, were very important. The first phase of renovation, funded by the state and the EEC, was completed in 1991. The theater reopened for the first time in about 40 years later with the 4th Meeting of Amateur Theaters of the Aegean (29 October to 8 November 1991) where the Cultural Association of Ano Syros took part in. The new wallpapers were created in 1998 by Dimitris Fortsas.

=== Today ===
Reconstruction works were completed in 2000 by architect Petros Pikionis, approved by the Ministry of Culture and under the supervision and with support from the Technical Services of the municipality. The capacity of the theater today is 350 people. Since 2002, it has been operating in the field of theater, with varied exhibits of posters, costumes of various presentations and more. Today, it hosts various cultural events and festivals, such as the Aegean Festival, the Animasyros International Film Festival and the International Cycladic Classical Music Festival.

== Architecture ==
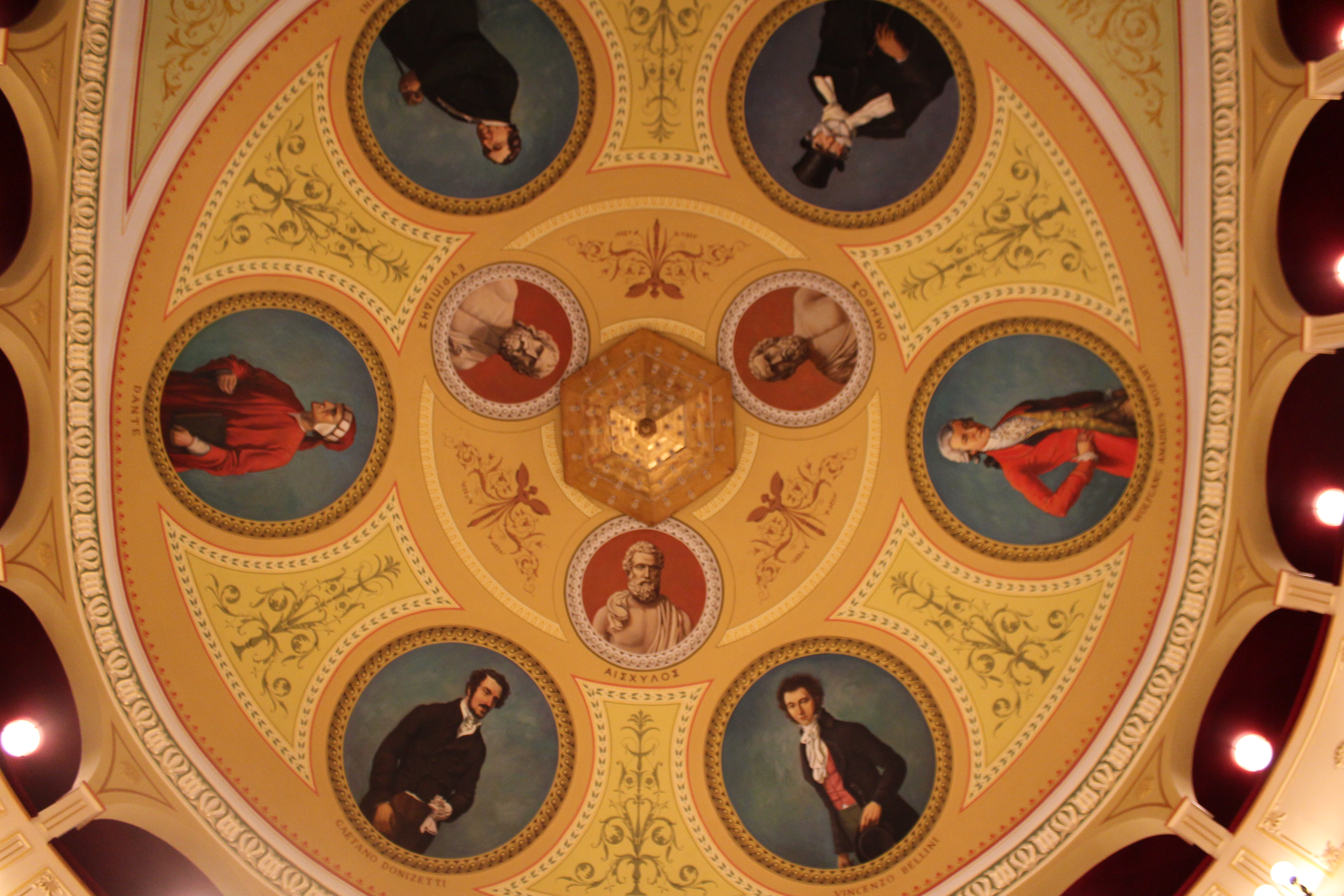
The ceiling

The Apollo Theater has been regarded as a miniature of La Scala. Its architecture has been influenced by Italian standards and its design is influenced by at least four of them: the La Scala (1776), the restored Teatro di San Carlo in Naples (1816), the Academic Theater in Castellranco (1745), and the Teatro della pergola of Florence (1755). The support of the vaults follows the French system of the period.

The theater has no rich exterior architectural decoration. It is a simple two-storey building with a low marble plinth and plastered facades. The floors are divided by a strip of limestone and have a cornice in the ground floor. In the central part of the main face, all of marble, the vertical axis with four pillars all over the height, bearing a shield, is strongly emphasized. The entire building has a single cornice, arched openings on the ground floor and rectangular on the floor.

The stage is 9 m wide, 10 m deep. and limited to the requirements of the European lyrical theater, but keeping the proportions of the Italian tradition. The decoration of the vouchers is simple, with light colours and frames with embossed rosettes in the center and gold plated jewelry at the corners. The seats, rails and wing curtains are velvet. In the middle of the ceiling wallpapers depict poets and composers.
