= Donka (name) =

Donka is a feminine Bulgarian given name that is a diminutive form of the masculine name Andon used in Bulgaria. It is also a Polish feminine given name that is a diminutive form of Donata used in Poland, as well as a Russian feminine given name that is a diminutive form of Domna used in Israel, Vietnam, Moldova, Bulgaria, Romania, Hungary, Slovakia, Czech Republic, Poland. Notable people with this name include the following:

== Given name ==
- Donka Mincheva (born 1973), Bulgarian weightlifter
- Donka Angatscheva (born 1979), Bulgarian-born pianist

== See also ==
- Donka (disambiguation)
- Donna (given name)
- Tonka (name)
