= Mergler =

Mergler is a German surname. Notable people with the surname include:

- Donna Mergler (born 1944), Canadian physiologist
- Marie J. Mergler (1851–1901), American physician
