= Animasyros =

International animation festival and forum

Animasyros is an international animation festival and forum. Since 2008 the festival takes place in the capital of Cyclades, Hermoupolis of Syros, and includes animation movies screenings, special tributes to international festivals, professional forum with the participation of distinguished Greek and foreign creators and professionals, workshops for students and children, the applied follow-up workshop “making of”, parties and other parallel events.

== History ==
Each year the festival is enriched by new and original events, focused on social issues, such as domestic violence, the status of women, racism, etc. All events are free and are held in venues of the island, such as the Apollon Theatre, the municipal Cultural Centre, the local cinema. In 2014 open-air screenings began to take place on Miaoulis Square. Animasyros is the largest animation festival in Greece and one of the 20 largest of its kind in Europe. In 2014 the festival joined the European Project “Creative Europe”, which was designed to support millions of artists and professionals in the cultural field and to offer a new impulse on the cultural sector of Europe, and took advantage of its resources. Aim of the festival has from the early beginning been to show how a relatively new form of art in Greece, as animation, can be adopted by the Greek art scene as well as to present significant creators. The selection of the event venue was made in connection to the fact that a society full of urban culture, such as Hermoupolis’ one, can enfold an initiative, which is gradually transformed from a local one to an international. In 2014 Animasyros joined, after a decision taken by Syros- Hermoupolis’ City Council, the task group that will create and establish the proposal of the nomination “Syros- Cyclades 2021” - Cultural Capital of Europe.

== International participation ==
The festival has gradually become an attraction spot for tens of significant artists and animation schools. In the past outstanding schools, festivals as well as representatives of award-winning animation production companies participated in the happenings and tributes of Animasyros. Owing to the festival, artists like Nina Paley, Jim Capobianco, Ülo Pikkov, Patrick Smith, Marie-Margaux Tsakiri-Scanatovits, Alain Baran, as well as representatives of production companies, such as LAIKA, Pixar and DreamWorks, and international festivals, such as Anima Brussels International Animation Film Festival, Canterbury Anifest, Annecy International Festival of Animated Film, Trickfilm festival, Hiroshima international animation festival, Anifest, Animafest Zagreb etc., visited Syros. Furthermore, the festival program has occasionally included special tributes to artists like Signe Baumane, Jacques- Rémy Girerd etc.

== Greek participation and workshops ==
Greek animation scene is represented each year in the festival with special tributes as well as through the competition section, which highlights any notable creative effort. Throughout the seven years of the festival, prominent creators like Aggelos Spartalis, Helen Miltsi, Effie Pappa etc. have distinguished. At the same time, Animasyros runs a student competition sector, which constitutes a great chance for new talents to emerge. Greek animation artists and teachers like Christine Depian, Helen Mouri, Giannis Xagoraris, Constantinos Tiligades etc. undertake to teach in the workshops of Animasyros and host tens of animation fans. The free educational programs of the festival, including both children and applied workshops, cover the largest possible range of creation fields.

== Mascot, production and supporters ==
The mascot of the festival is “AnimaSpyros”; a Cycladic figure with references to director Woody Allen. “AnimaSpyros” was designed by Petros Christoulias and developed in three dimensions by Constantinos Petrou. Since 2008 has accompanied all festival events and reminds us of both the origin and the concept of the festival. Animasyros is organized by PLATFORMA – Company of Urban Culture. The production team of the festival consists of above fifty members, who apart from coordinating and managing the event are also dealing with artistic and technical issues, such as animation, graphic design, direction, photography, multimedia etc. Additionally, valuable partners of the festival are the volunteers –around fifty on average- who contribute to the accomplishment of all Animasyros events. Animasyros is set every year under the auspices of the Municipality of Syros- Hermoupolis, the South Aegean Region, whereas receives the active support of both public, such as the General Secretariat for Gender Equality, the Ministry of Tourism, the University of Aegean, and private institutions, such as Onassis Cultural Centre, the Benaki Museum etc. Supporters of the festival are also on a regular basis educational departments of foreign embassies in Greece. The involvement of the local business community of the island has all these seven years been at a high level. Local authorities have confronted the festival from the early beginning with great respect, since except of its artistic dynamic the festival has contributed to the extension of the island's touristic season as well as has presented the island as a high standards’ touristic destination. The participation in all the activities and screenings of Animasyros is free.

== Animasyros7 ==
The festival reached its seven years of active presence in 2014. The happenings of Animasyros7, which were held from 2 to 5 October, included for a first time open-air screenings on Miaoulis Square, executed with the use of special technical equipment. This year's screenings and parallel events attracted more than 3.000 visitors, both Greek and foreign. The happenings of Animasyros7 opened for a first time with a special ceremony at the Benaki Museum in Athens, where a presentation of this year's events and screenings as well as an overall assessment of Animasyros6 took place. Guests of this event were, among others, Mark Shapiro, representative of LAIKA Studio, creator Nina Paley along with representatives of the American Embassy in Athens, which is an ardent supporter of the festival. As far as the artistic part is concerned, Animasyros included more than one hundred screenings, special guests from the U.S., the Great Britain, France and other countries, thematic workshops for elementary students, young and older animation fans, whereas a nationwide premiere of the new production of the award-winning animation studio LAIKA, “The Boxtrolls”, was held. For four whole days, Hermoupolis experienced the spirit of the animation world. As a neoclassical city, Hermoupolis, resembled to animation movie scenery along with the 150 years old Apollon Theatre and the enthusiastic audience (students, professionals, journalists, natives of all ages, parents carrying their children within the theatre's hall). The age spectrum was even more astonishing as far as artistic attainments of the workshops are concerned; animation students accompanied by professional teachers introduced young students of Hermoupolis to how the art of animation is executed and produced small samples of animation work.

Animasyros7 awards were given as follows:

1. Grand prize of Animasyros 7.0 was given to “Historia de un oso” from Chile
2. Special Mention to a Greek Film in Student Competition Program was given to “Man in a box” by Ilias Papastamatiou
3. Special Mention in Student Competition was given to “Mythopolis” by Alexandra Hetmerova from Czech Republic
4. Best Student Film was given to “My stuffed granny” by Effie Pappa from the UK
5. Special Mention to a Greek film in International Competition Program was given to “Dinner for few” by Nassos Vakalis
6. Special Mention to a film in International Competition Program was given to “Canis” by Marc Riba & Anna Solanas

In 2014 the festival was accompanied by special tributes targeted both to raise the awareness of the public opinion and to disseminate the perspective of the big schools of European animation to the festival's audience. The festival honored in 2014 women creators as well as the female element in the art of animation. Therefore, a tribute to gender equality was carried out under the auspices of the General Secretariat for Gender Equality and the American Embassy in Athens. The tribute entitled “Woman in Anima” included movies screenings by internationally renowned artist Signe Baumane, whose work is focused on modern woman issues, such as the recently awarded film “Rocks in my pockets”, as well as movies like “Sita sings the blues” by Nina Paley. Furthermore, the festival hosted this year special and enriched tributes with European orientation. With the support of the Institut Francais de Athenes (IFA), the festival realized a tribute to the great creator of animation movies Jacques-Rémy Girerd, founder of the famous studio Folimage. With reference to the north of Europe other significant events were also held within the festival; the tribute to Animafest Zagreb from Croatia, which since its establishment in 1972 is the second oldest animation festival in Europe, as well as the tributes to Tallinn Black Nights Film Festival and to Animated Dreams sub-festival, which both count more than fifteen years of active presence and come from the particularly active in animation production country of Estonia.

== Animasyros and European Cultural Capital 2021 Project ==
In the summer of 2014 the first contacts between Animasyros and local authorities of Syros began in order to discuss the possibility of Animasyros involvement in the preparation proceedings of the nomination of the Municipality of Syros as Cultural Capital of Europe 2021. In October 2014, an official task group was created with the participation of the local authorities as well as institutions linked to cultural and touristic affairs, so as a nomination proposal entitled “Syros- Cyclades 2021 – Cultural Capital of Europe” to be formed. Animasyros became part of this group and now works towards drafting and promoting the nomination, recognizing the uniqueness of Hermoupolis as well as of the whole archipelago as an integral monument of European cultural reference. At the same time, Animasyros strongly supports every initiative taken by the Municipality in its effort to get the historic site of Hermoupolis and the medieval settlement of Ano Syros included in the Unesco World Heritage List as the 18th Greek monument.
