= Donna (given name) =

- Pronunciation: /ˈdɒnə/; Italian: [ˈdɔnna]
- Gender: Female
- Language: English

Origin
- Language: Italian
- Derivation: Latin: domina
- Meaning: 'lady'

Donna is an English-language feminine first name meaning 'woman' in modern Italian, and 'lady' or 'mistress' in classical Italian. The original meaning is closer to 'lady of the home' and was a title of respect in Italy, equivalent to Don for gentlemen or lord. It is a common given name in the United States, particularly in Chicago, Florida, New York City, and Washington. It is rare as a surname.

== People with the given name ==
- Donna Adelson (born 1950), American convicted murderer
- Donna Air (born 1979), English actress
- Donna Alvermann, American educator and researcher
- Donna Andrews, American author
- Donna Axum (1942–2018), American beauty pageant winner, author, television executive producer, philanthropist and model
- Donna Baird, American epidemiologist and evolutionary-population biologist
- Donna Barnes, American politician
- Donna J. Boley (born 1935), American politician
- Donna Brazile, American political activist
- Donna Bruton (1954–2012), American painter, educator
- Donna Burke, Australian singer, voice actress and businesswoman
- Donna Christensen (born 1945), American physician and politician
- Donna Cruz, Filipino pop singer
- Donna Deegan (born 1961), American politician
- Donna D'Errico, American actress
- Donna Dixon, American actress
- Donna Doore, American politician
- Donna Douglas, American actress
- Donna Edwards, American politician
- Donna Ellis, American politician
- Donna Fargo, American country singer
- Donna M. Felling, American politician
- Donna Feore (born 1963), Canadian choreographer and theatre director
- Donna Ferrato (born 1949), American photojournalist and activist
- Donna Gabaccia (born 1949), American historian
- Donna Givens, American politician from Alabama
- Donna Jean Godchaux (1947–2025), American singer
- Donna Gould (born 1966), Australian cyclist
- Donna Hanover (born 1950), American journalist, radio and television personality, and actress
- Donna Haraway, American philosopher
- Donna Harpauer, Canadian politician
- Donna Howard (born 1951), American politician
- Donna Hylton, Jamaican-American kidnapper and murderer
- Donna Karan, American fashion designer
- Donna Kelce, American former banker
- Donna Kellogg (born 1978), English badminton player
- Donna Keogh, British missing person
- Donna Kirkland, Australian politician
- Donna Kossy (born 1957), American writer
- Donna Ladd (born 1961), American journalist
- Donna Langley (born 1968), British film executive, and chairwoman of Universal Pictures
- Donna Leon (born 1942), American novelist
- Donna Lewis, Welsh singer
- Donna Loren (born 1947), American singer and actress, the Dr Pepper Girl in the 1960s
- Donna Lynne (born 1953), American politician
- Donna Maguire, Provisional Irish Republican Army member
- Donna Mayhew, American javelin thrower
- Donna McKechnie (born 1942), American actress
- Donna Mergler, Canadian physiologist
- Donna Mills, American actress who played Abby Cunningham on Knots Landing
- Donna Mombourquette, American politician
- Donna Morrissey, Canadian author
- Donna Murphy (born 1959), American stage and film actress
- Donna Nelson (born 1954), American chemist and professor
- Donna Orender (born 1957), American Women's Pro Basketball League All-Star guard and former WNBA president
- Donna Pescow, American actress
- Donna Reed, American actress
- Donna Ritchie (born 1963), Australian wheelchair basketball player
- Donna Robertson (born 1969), Scottish judoka and wrestler
- Donna Rozar (born 1950), American politician, businesswoman, and nurse
- Donna Rubin (born 1959), American tennis player
- Donna Scott-Mottley, Jamaican politician
- Donna Schlachman (born 1949), American politician
- Donna Shalala, Secretary of Health and Human Services under President Bill Clinton
- Donna Strickland, Canadian physicist and Nobel laureate 2018
- Donna Summer (1948–2012), American singer, notably of disco music
- Donna Tartt, American writer
- Donna Testerman (born 1960), mathematician
- Donna Vekić, Croatian tennis player
- Donna Wilkes (born 1958), American actress
- Donna Zuckerberg (born 1987), American classicist, feminist, and writer

== Fictional characters ==
- Donna Bishop, character in Home and Away
- Donna Berzatto, character on The Bear
- Donna Cabonna, character in That's So Raven
- Donna Duck, character in the 1937 Disney short Don Donald
- Donna Clark (née Emerson), a character in Halt and Catch Fire
- Donna Freedman, character in Neighbours
- Donna Hayward, character in Twin Peaks
- Donna Henshaw, a character in Two Pints of Lager and a Packet of Crisps
- Donna Logan, character in The Bold and the Beautiful
- Donna Ludlow, character in EastEnders
- Donna Martin, character in Beverly Hills, 90210
- Donna Meagle, main character in Parks and Recreation
- Donna Moss, main character in The West Wing
- Donna Noble, character in Doctor Who
- Donna Paulsen, character in Suits
- Donna Pinciotti, character That 70s Show
- Donna Sheridan in Mamma Mia!
- Donna Troy aka "Wonder Girl", character from DC Comics
- Donna Tubbs, character in The Cleveland Show
- Donna Windsor, character in Emmerdale
- Donna Yates, character in EastEnders

== See also ==
- Donna (disambiguation)
- Dana
- Donka (name)
