= Domna =

Domna (Russian: Домна) can refer to:

- Domna, Republic of Buryatia, a selo (village) in Sosnovo-Ozersky Selsoviet of Yeravninsky District of the Republic of Buryatia, Russia
- Domna, Zabaykalsky Krai, a selo in Chitinsky District of Zabaykalsky Krai, Russia
- Domna (air base), air base in Zabaykalsky Krai, Russia

== Names ==
- Domna (name), Latin name
- Julia Domna (d. 217), Roman empress
- Domna Visvizi (1783–1850), Greek revolutionary
- Domna Anisimova (1815–1877), Russian poet
- Domna Michailidou, Greek economist
- Domna Samiou (1928–2012), Greek musician

== Other ==
- Domna, crater on Vesta, see List of geological features on Vesta
