= Danka =

Danka may refer to:

- A family affiliated with a Buddhist temple in Japan, or danka.

== People with the given name ==
- Danka Barteková (born 1984), Slovak skeet shooter
- Danka Kovinić (born 1994), Montenegrin professional tennis player
- Danka Podovac (born 1982), Serbian football player

== People with the surname ==
- Imre Danka (1930–2014), Hungarian footballer

== See also ==
- Danke (disambiguation)
- Donka (disambiguation)
