= Danke =

Danke may refer to:

- "Danke" (song), a 1961 hymn by Martin Gotthard Schneider
- "Danke", a 2006 song by Xavier Naidoo
- Danke (politician) (born 1962), Chinese Communist Party official
- Katlego Danke (born 1978), South African actress

== See also ==
- Dangke, an Indonesian cheese
- Danka (disambiguation)
