= Domna Visvizi =

Greek revolutionary (1783–1850)

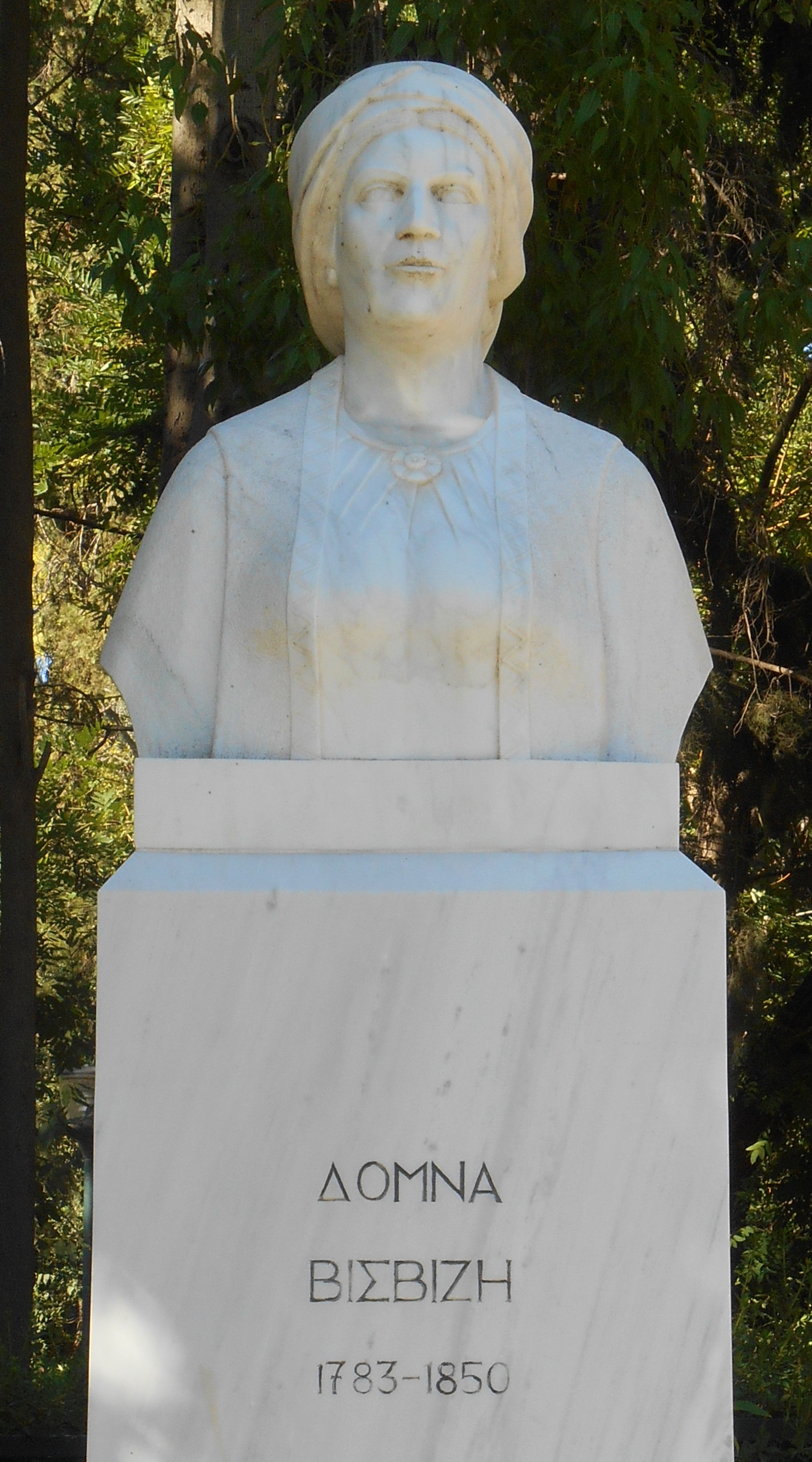
- Visvizi's bust in the Pedion tou Areos
- Native name: Δόμνα Βισβίζη
- Nickname(s): Bouboulina of Thrace
- Born: 1783; Chios, Ottoman Empire
- Died: 1850 (aged 67); Piraeus, Athens, Greece
- Allegiance: Greece
- Rank: Captain

Domna Visvizi (Greek: Δόμνα Βισβίζη; 1783–1850) was a Greek maritime captain who fought in the Greek War of Independence. At the outbreak of the war, Visvizi joined her husband Chatzi Antonis Visvizis to fight for the Greek cause onboard the ship Kalomoira. After her husband was killed in battle in July 1822, Visvizi took command of the ship and continued to fight in the war. Among other contributions, Visvizi aided in the Greek capture of the island of Euboea. After running low on funds and being rejected additional funding by the Greek leadership, Visvizi gave over the Kalomoira to the Greek navy in 1824. After the war she was left destitute and with next to no government support lived in poverty until her death in 1850.

== Personal life ==
Visvizi was born on Chios in 1783. Her family were rich landowners. In 1808, at the age of 25, she married her husband Chatzi Antonis Visvizis in Ainos, a maritime city in East Thrace. Visvizis was a wealthy ship-owner and one of the first members of the Filiki Eteria, a secret organization working to overthrow the rule of the Ottoman Empire over Greece. Visvizi was herself also later initiated into the Filiki Eteria.

Visvizi and Visvizis had five children together, three boys and two girls. Their youngest child was born after Visvizis's death in 1822.

== Greek War of Independence ==
At the outbreak of the Greek War of Independence in 1821, Ottoman forces attacked and ravaged Greek settlements in East Thrace since they were close to the imperial capital of Constantinople. Visvizi and Visvizis swiftly decided to take action; on 23 March 1821 they took their best ship, the Kalomoira, loaded it with valuables and people (including their five children), and armed it for war, setting out into the Aegean Sea. The ship also carried with it religious icons, the bones of Visvizi's ancestors and a sample of soil from Ainos. Visvizi, who had been made Sympolemistria (co-captain) by her husband, is upon setting out said to have stated "We do not regret spending money, since it will be used to build the golden palace of liberty".

The Kalomoira is said to have successfully partaken in several victorious battles under the command of the couple. Among other battles they took part in the campaign of Emmanouel Pappas in Chalkidiki and fought off the coasts of Athos, Lesbos and Samos. On 21 July 1822, Visvizis was killed in a naval operation near Euboea, reportedly being shot and killed in front of Visvizi's eyes while leading a fleet of thirty ships into battle in the Malian Gulf.

After the death of her husband, Visvizi took over command of the Kalomoira and its crew and continued to fight in the war. Visvizi was reportedly a skilled and respected naval commander and her ship instilled fear among the Ottoman fleet. The Kalomoira not only partook in battles but also at times transported food and ammunition, for instance supplying soldiers on Skiathos and the forces of Odysseas Androutsos on the mainland. Androutsos later wrote that his forces would have perished without Visvizi's aid. Among her contributions to the war were pinning down Ottoman forces on Euboea, preventing them from travelling to central Greece, and bombarding their camps, aiding in the successful Greek landing on the island.

Visvizi continued to captain the Kalomoira until the end of 1823, having fought for nearly three years, when she no longer possessed the funds necessary to continue maintaining the ship. She petitioned the Greek government for financial aid but was not given any. As a result, she in 1824 gave over the Kalomoira to the Greek navy. Having suffered extensive damage during battles, the Kalomoira was then converted into a fireship. Later in 1824 the Kalomoira sank the Ottoman ship Hazne Gemnisi.

== Life after the war ==
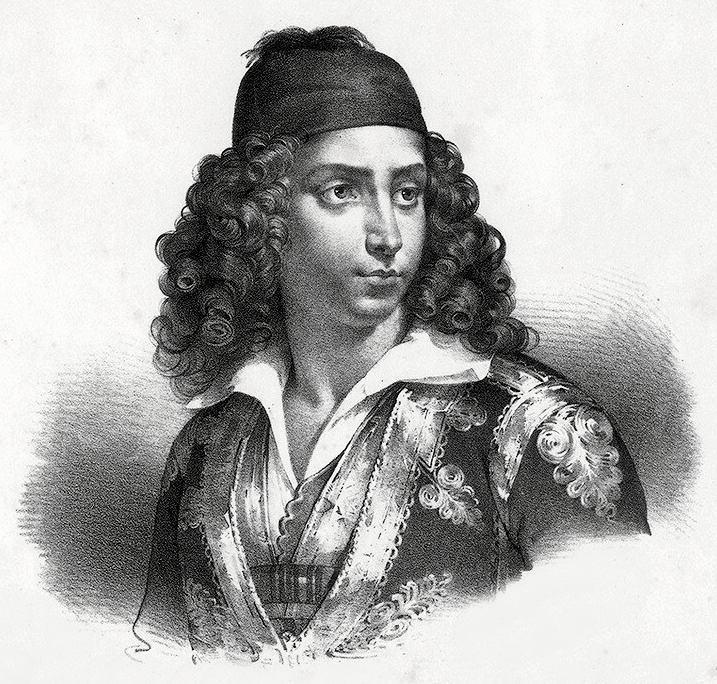
Engraved portrait of her son Themistocles, ca. 1827

After 1824, Visvizi and her family lived in poverty. They first lived in Nafplio and then in Ermoupoli. In Nafplio, Visvizi partnered with a monk to open a coffee shop but he stole her money; she was also taken advantage of by fraudsters in Ermoupoli. In order to be able to support her children, she petitioned the Greek government for financial assistance but was granted a monthly allowance of only thirty drachmas, the smallest possible amount. One of Visvizi's children died in a famine in 1826.

Visvizi's eldest son, Themistocles Dimitrios, was sent to study in Paris by the French Philhellenic Committee. Themistocles would later serve as the governor of Naxos 1845–1876.

In 1845, Visvizi moved to Piraeus in Athens, where she lived in a small hut next to the sea. She died in poverty in 1850 at the age of 67.

== Legacy ==
Already in life, Visvizi's efforts in the war inspired folk poetry. After her death, Visvizi was nicknamed the "Bouboulina of Thrace". Despite achieving some renown, the participation of women such as Visvizi in the Greek War of Independence was long underestimated and nearly ignored by historians in the 19th and 20th centuries. Among figures such as Manto Mavrogenous of Trieste, Konstandia Zaharia of Sparta, Savaina of Mani, and Asimo Lidouriki of Athens, Visvizi is considered one of the lesser known heroines of the war.

Visvizi has a statue in Alexandroupoli, built in 2005. She also has a bust in the Pedion tou Areos, a park in Athens built to honor heroes of the Greek War of Independence. The bust was also inaugurated in 2005.
