= Donka =

Donka may refer to the following:

- Donka (name)
- Donka Hospital, Guinean hospital

== See also ==
- Danka (disambiguation)
