= Greek Steamship Company =

Defunct steamship company (1856–1905)

- Industry: Shipping
- Founded: 1856
- Defunct: 1905
- Fate: Bankrupt
- Headquarters: Syros, Greece

The Greek Steamship Company (sometimes, The Hellenic Steam Navigation Company) was the first steamship company in modern Greece. Established on the Aegean island of Syros, the company provided transportation links within Greece and to Europe and the Middle East. Eventually, as Syros's prosperity declined, the company went out of business.

== Founding and early history ==
The Greek Steamship Company was established in 1856 in the city of Hermoupolis (often spelled "Ermoupoli"), on the island of Syros. This was the first steamship company in Greece. The primary task of the company was (1) to link up the Greek islands (particularly the Cyclades) and the coastal cities and (2) to better connect Greece with wider Europe and the Middle East. In 1832, Athens was named the capital of the newly independent Kingdom of Greece, however Ermoupoli in Syros remained the commercial and industrial hub until the mid-19th century. In some instances the steamship company is sometimes referred to as the "Greek Steamship Company", though British Foreign Office documents refer to "The Hellenic Steam Navigation Company".

The operations of the company's steamships began in earnest in 1857 with its three ships: Hydra, Queen of Greece and Panhellenion. The early routes went to Greek ports, notably Piraeus (near Athens) and to the Peloponnesos. In 1858, two more ships were added to the original three and the routes were extended to Thessaloniki and Crete. By 1862, there were eleven ships making regular voyages to Smyrna (now İzmir), Constantinople (now Istanbul) and other ports along the Turkish coast. The company was successful from its start in 1857 until a decline occurred in the late 1880s.

The driving force behind the company was its founder, Ilias Kehayas who led the company until his death in December 1885.

== The Greek Steamship Company's steam-operated ironworks ==
The steam-operated ironworks established by the Greek Steamship Company was the first large factory building in Ermoupoli. At the time it was the only building of its kind in the eastern Mediterranean, and in the entire Middle East. The designs were produced in western Europe and the work was carried out by Mr. Sampo, the municipal architect in Ermoupoli. The ironworks were established in order to facilitate the building, repair and maintenance of ships. The building still plays a significant part in the modern Syros Shipyard, although there have been a few alterations to the building over the many decades. Nonetheless the rectangular building still retains its original shape.

The steam-operated ironworks began work in April, 1861. David Smith, an Englishman, was the engineer in charge. Countless ships were repaired in the factory which still operates. They also built steamships, as well as providing a school for educating Greeks who desired to become mechanical engineers or to work in shipping.

== The steamship company's new "convention" of 1881 ==
The following statement appears in a letter from British Consul William Pryor Binney (Syra), in amongst his Foreign Office correspondence (i.e. consul private reports to Earl Granville, Foreign Secretary in London). The letter is dated 19 May 1881:

British Screw Steamer Truthful of Liverpool Official Number 78740 J. O'Keefe Master, which vessel arrived here from Liverpool on the 15th instant and was delivered to the Hellenic Steam Navigation Company at this Port in pursuance of instructions and a Bill of Sale from her owner Mr. Basilio Papayanni [or "Papaquami"?] of Liverpool....first of three steamers which the Hellenic Steam Navigation Company are bound to add to their fleet in accordance with the terms of their new Convention with the Hellenic Government.

[Letter found at the National Archives (UK), Kew, London U.K. in the 1881 Foreign Office volume with correspondence to and from the British consuls in Greece. The volume's National Archive reference number is: FO 32/534]

The second of the three steamers, the Wicklow ("of Glasgow Official Number 60460 William Perfect Lapage Master") arrived in Syros from Cardiff (Wales) on 8 August 1881 [Letter from British Consul W. P. Binney dated 11th Aug. 1881, found in 1881 Foreign Office volume in the National Archive at Kew, London: National Archive ref. no. FO 32/534, p. 149].

The Hellenic Steam Navigation Company purchased its third ship of 1881, the British Screw Steamer Raven "of Glasgow Off. No. 60393" on 16 October 1881 [Letter from British Consul W. P. Binney dated 18 October 1881, found in 1881 Foreign Office volume in the National Archive at Kew, London: National Archive ref. no. FO 32/534, p. 162].

Though the new 1881 "Convention" appears to have required the company to purchase three steamships, there was in fact a fourth vessel purchased. This was the Screw Steamer Portland "of Liverpool Official Number 76725 Frank Boyce Dobson Master" which arrived from Liverpool in Syros on 12 September 1882 [Letter from British Consul W. P. Binney dated 18 August 1882, found in 1882 Foreign Office volume in the National Archive at Kew, London: National Archive ref. no. FO 32/546, p. 127].

The picture which emerges from 1881 - 1882 is that of a still vigorous steamship company in Syros, with four newly added screw steamers providing daily connections and daily post between Hermoupolis and the surrounding Aegean to mainland Greece and beyond. A later letter from Consul Cottrell in 1893 (see below) leads one to the conclusion that ten or more steamships were operating on numerous routes linking Syra with the outside world in the 1880s. Meanwhile, the Piraeus (the port of Athens) was annually becoming larger and larger, and competing with Syra all the more.

== Late 1880s decline ==
Sometime towards the end of the 1880s decline became apparent at the Greek Steamship Company. One factor was the opening of the Corinth Canal in 1882 which meant that much shipping travelled by a more direct route rather than going by Syros. Another factor was the expansion of railways, offering alternative methods for getting goods between destinations. A third factor was the growth of Piraeus, the port of Athens, which had evolved into the primary port in Greece (Athens in the meantime had overtaken Ermoupoli as the chief centre of Greek trade). The decline in ship building and repair on Syros was further accelerated following the Balkan Wars of 1912-13 when centres such as Crete, Chios, Samos, Epiros and southern Macedonia were united into Greece—each of these became important commercial centres.

As he sensed the competition coming from Piraeus and Athens (and other locations), Stephanos Skouloudis a member of Parliament representing Syros led strenuous campaigns in both 1881 and 1890 to seek to forge a large "Greek National Steamship Company" (which would have included the Greek Steamship Company), but these efforts eventually failed to keep steamship firms based in Syros. In 1892 the company found itself compelled into bankruptcy. John MacDowell and Barber Co. (owners of the "Hephaistos" shipyard at Piraeus) rented the ships and factory.

In a letter dated April 12, 1893 British Consul William Henry Cottrell (who lived in Ermoupoli) stated that "ten steamers belonging to the Hellenic Steam Navigation Company were sold off" and that the company had gone bankrupt. One consequence of this, which Cottrell highlighted in the same letter, was the disruption of the postal service to and from Syros. The loss of the ten steamships was more than a loss of ships, it was a major blow to the retreating economy of Syros which had been the economic centre of Greece until the mid-19th century. [Letter written by British Consul Cottrell found in Foreign Office volume for Consuls in Greece, 1893, National Archive (Kew, London, UK) reference number: FO 32/653.]

Significant effort went into launching the "New Greek Steamship Company" later in the 1890s, but this was short-lived and in 1905 was declared bankrupt.

== Sources ==
Samos Steamship Co. https://samossteamship.gr

- HERMOUPOLIS: THE CREATION OF A NEW CITY ON SYROS AT THE BEGINNING OF THE 19TH CENTURY written by John Travlos and Angeliki Kokkou (English language work published by the Commercial Bank of Greece, Athens, 1984)
- PANDORA No. 16 (Greek language periodical, 1866)
- KUKLADIKA, B issue 7, 1957-58 (this Greek language periodical contains a major article on the Greek Steamship Company with bibliography)
- FOREIGN OFFICE Volumes of the British Consuls in Greece: 1881 FO 32/534; 1882 FO 32/546; 1892 FO 32/644; 1893 FO 32/653, all found in the National Archive, Kew, London, U.K. Acknowledgements to National Archive Researchers: Randall Barlow and Pauline Barlow.
- ERMOUPOLI - SYROS: A HISTORICAL TOUR written by Christina Agriantoni, Angeliki Fenerli and Ioakeim Karakoulidis (an English language guidebook sponsored by Ermoupoli Municipal Development Enterprise, published by Olkos Publications, 1999)
- Non print sources include the various museums and archives on the island of Syros, particularly the main Archive of the Cyclades (located in the Court House in Syros) as well as Industrial Museum in Hermoupolis; also various non-bound documents studied by Pauline and Randall Barlow
