= Donka Angatscheva =

Austrian pianist of Bulgarian descent

- Born: 1 January 1979 (age 47); Plovdiv, Bulgaria
- Origin: Austria
- Genres: Classical
- Instrument: Piano

Donka Angatscheva (born 1 January 1979, Plovdiv, Bulgaria) is an Austrian pianist of Bulgarian descent. She lives in Vienna.

== Early life ==
At age 5, Angatscheva received her first piano lessons. Her first public appearance came at age 10 with the Plovdiv Philharmonic Orchestra. She started her studies at the Vienna University of Music and Performing Arts (MDW) in the class of Heinz Medjimorec, where she earned a master of arts in piano performance in 2004.

At the Queen Elizabeth College of Music (la Chapelle Musicale reine Elisabeth- CMRE) she completed her postgraduate studies in the class of the Artemis Quartet and with Avedis Kouyoumdjian.,

== Career ==
Angatscheva played in 2011 together with her trio D´Ante at the Radio France Festival Montpellier, at the Chopin Festival Flagey, Palais des Beaux-Arts in Brussels and at the Festival Menton, France.

In December 2012, she gave a guest performance with D´Ante at the Tonhalle Zürich.

In June 2013, she played the Malediction by Franz Liszt at the Liszt Festival in Raiding with the Bayreuther Chamber Orchestra conducted by Nicolaus Richter. A follow-up performance with D´Ante came In 2014.

== Personal life ==
Angatscheva is fluent in German, Bulgarian, English, Spanish, Greek and Serbo-Croatian. She is married and has two daughters.

== Awards ==
- 1989: First prize at the national piano contest „Dimitar Nenov“, Razgrad, Bulgaria.
- 1990: Second prize (first prize was not awarded) at the 8th International piano contest in Salerno, Italy.
- 1997: second prize (first prize was not awarded) at the national piano contest at the Academy of Music and Arts, Plovdiv, Bulgaria.
- 2003: First prize at the 13th International Chamber Music Contest in Thessaloniki, Greece, together with Daniela Ivanova, violist with the Wiener Philharmoniker.
- 2007: First prize at the 17th International Chamber Music Contest in Thessaloniki, Greece, with her trio D´Ante.
- 2011: Winner of the „Young Artist Award“ by Foundation Aeschlimann, Switzerland

== Discography ==
- 2001: Frédéric Chopin, pianoworks (Global Private Equity).
- 2010: Cuatro estaciones porteñas-Astor Piazzolla, E.Fernandes Arbos.

=== Trio D’Ante - Donka Angatscheva-piano, Valya Dervenska - violin, Teodora Miteva-cello ===
- 2011: piano trios Chopin, Liszt, Rachmaninoff, Schostakowitsch. Trio D'Ante-Vienna

Donka Angatscheva -pia o Valya Dervenska-violin Teodora Miteva-cello (Gramola 98934).

- 2011: Franz Liszt, pianoworks (Gramola 98924)
- 2014: Mozart, Sarasate

=== Yury Revich-violin Donka Angatscheva-piano (Onepoint.fm) ===
- 2015: Addinsell, Rota, Piazzolla

=== Vogtland Philharmonie, Stefan Fraas-Dirigent, Donka Angatscheva-piano ===
- 2016: "Appassionato"- Ludwig van Beethoven, pianoworks
- 2017: "Dedication"-pianoworks, Franz Liszt
