= Domna, Republic of Buryatia =

Domna Домна
- Selo
- Location within Republic of Buryatia Location within Russia
- Coordinates: 52°33′N 111°42′E
- Country: Russia
- Region: Republic of Buryatia
- District: Yeravninsky District
- Time zone: UTC+8:00

Domna (Russian: Домна; Buryat: Домно, Domno) is a rural locality (a selo) in Yeravninsky District, Republic of Buryatia, Russia. The population was 160 as of 2010. There are 11 streets.

== Geography ==
Domna is located 13 km northeast of Sosnovo-Ozerskoye (the district's administrative centre) by road. Sosnovo-Ozerskoye is the nearest rural locality.
