= Imre Danka =

Hungarian footballer

Personal information
- Date of birth: 24 December 1930
- Place of birth: Szombathely, Kingdom of Hungary
- Date of death: 3 May 2014 (aged 83)
- Position: Goalkeeper

Senior career*
Years	Team	Apps	(Gls)
1946–1948	Szombathelyi Bőrgyár		
1948–1950	Szombathelyi MTE		
1950–1954	Szombathelyi Honvéd		
1954–1955	Székesfehérvári Építők		
1955–1964	Pécsi Dózsa		

International career
1955	Hungary	4	(0)
- * Club domestic league appearances and goals

Imre Danka (24 December 1930 – 3 May 2014) was a Hungarian footballer who played as a goalkeeper.

== Career ==
Born in Szombathely, Danka played for Szombathelyi Bőrgyár, Szombathelyi MTE, Szombathelyi Honvéd, Székesfehérvári Építők and Pécsi Dózsa.

He also earned four caps for the Hungary national team.

== Later life and death ==
Danka died on 3 May 2014.
