= Donna Mergler =

Canadian physiologist

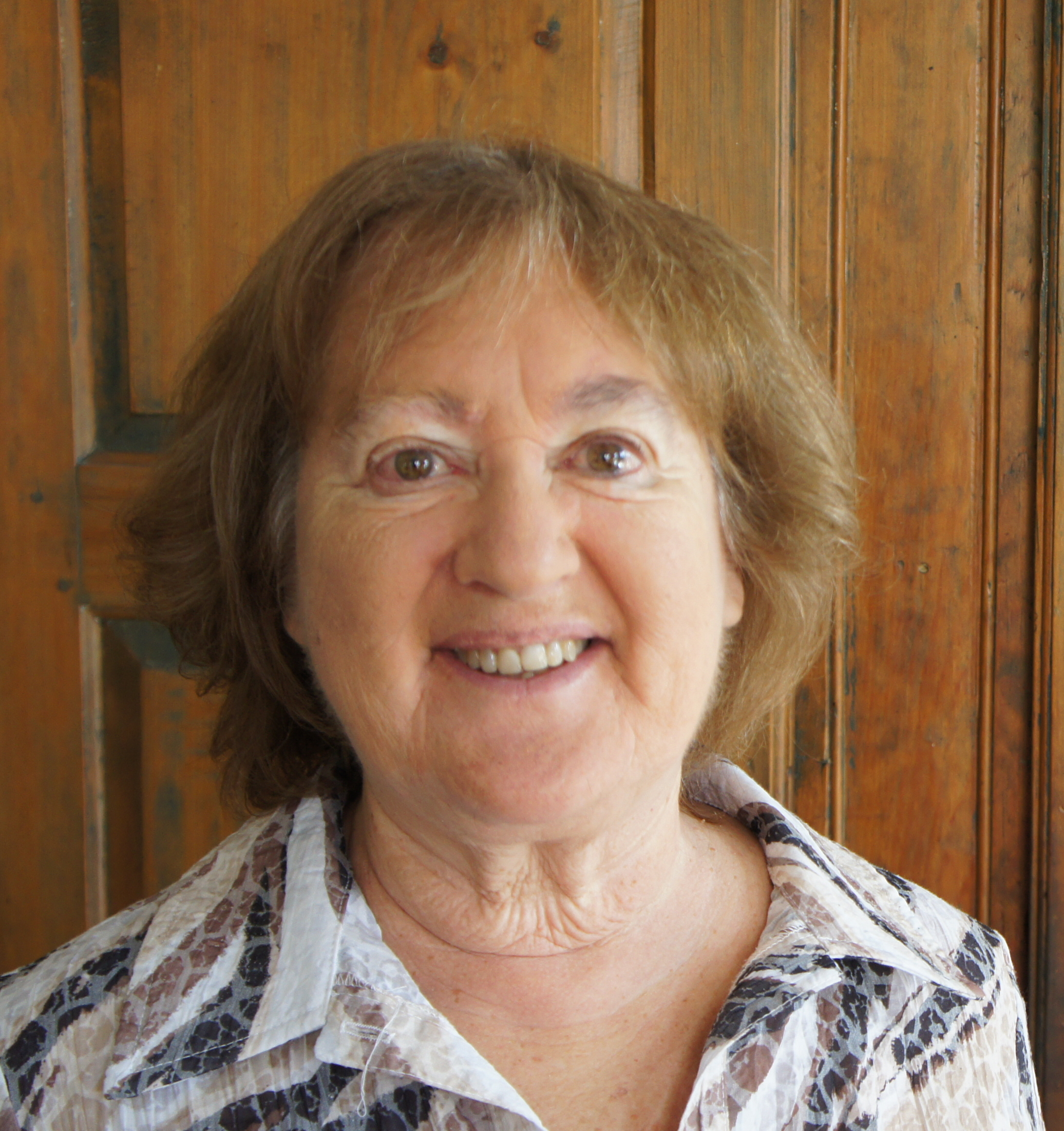
- Donna Mergler in August 2017
- Born: 7 June 1944
- Scientific career
- Fields: Environmental health, biological sciences
- Institutions: University of Quebec, Montreal

Donna Mergler is a Canadian physiologist and currently professor emerita in the department of biological sciences at the University of Quebec in Montreal, Canada. Her research focuses on environmental health, specifically the effects of neuro-toxins on workplace and environment. She has also brought in lasting and real solutions to environmental degradation, while also focusing on gender and social equity.

== Early life and education ==
Donna Mergler was born on 7 June 1944 in Montreal, Canada. She obtained her bachelor's degree in physiology from McGill University and her doctorate in neurophysiology. She continued in this department and obtained her PhD from McGill in 1973. She also became engaged in the biology department in 1970, at the Université du Québec à Montréal, where she became a professor of physiology and environmental health later on.

In 2006, after she retired, she received the title of professor emerita in the department of biological sciences from University of Quebec.

== Career and research ==
In 1990, she became a part of research center Cinbiose. She also headed the Canadian Institute for Health Research Team on Gender, Environment and Health, with the goal to develop quantitative and qualitative methods to integrate sex and gender into environmental and occupational health research. She researched the effect of mercury on the ecosystem of the Amazon with the project CARUSO and was the team leader of health studies within the Collaborative Mercury Research Network (COMERN).

In 2000, she researched reducing toxic chemicals in Latin America and the Caribbean, within a project called COPEH-TLAC. She was also a member of the collaboration between the World Health Organization and the Pan-American Health Organization: WHO-PAHO.

After her retirement in 2006, she still continued with her research and looked into the effects of the Minamata disease.

More research on neurotoxins has been done by Mergler when she researched what effect manganese had on the nervous system of populations across Canada, Mexico and Brazil.

== Awards and prizes ==
- In 1990, she won the Muriel DuckWorth Award for Women's Studies.
- In 1994, she won the Women of Merit in science and technology prize, by YWCA.
- In 1995, she won the Acfas Michel-Jurdant prize for her research towards protecting the environment, by ACFAS.
- In 2001, she received the Silver Award for Environmental Health, given out by the Canadian Minister of the Environment and Canadian Geographic magazine.
- In 2019, she was put on the City of Montreal's list of '21 exceptional women from Montreal', focusing on women in social science, science and culture.
- In 2023, she won the Scientists of the Year Radio-Canada prize with Myriam Fillion, Aline Philibert and Judy da Silva for documenting the effects of mercury poisoning in the water of Grassy Narrows First Nation.
