= Ermoupoli =

Town in Syros, Greece

Ermoupoli Ερμούπολη
- Municipal unit
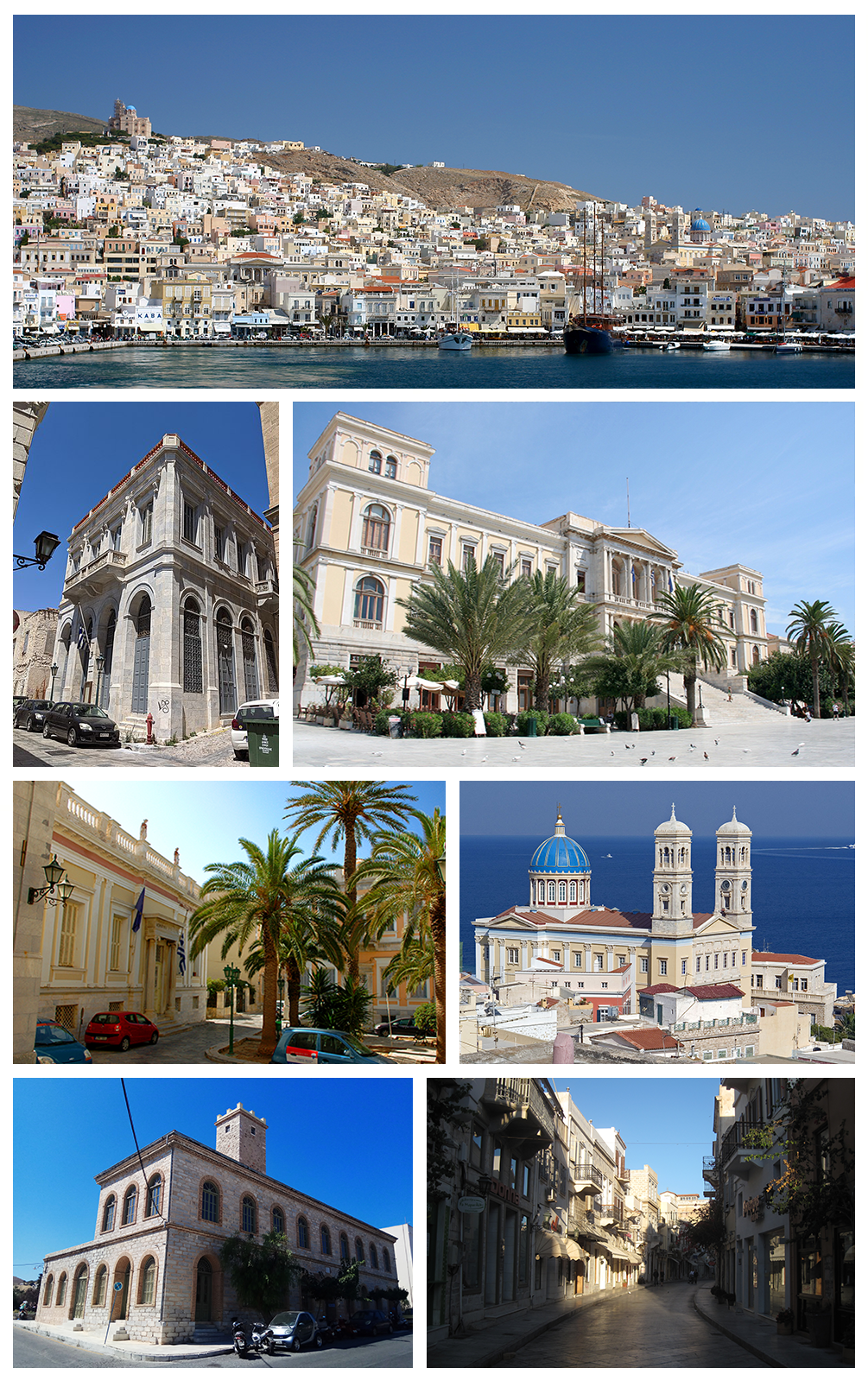
- Clockwise from top: Panoramic view of the City of Ermoupoli, the Miaouli Square and the City Hall of Ermoupoli, Cathedral of Saint Nicholas, a central street in Ermoupoli, Industrial Museum of Ermoupoli, Building of the South Aegean Administration, and characteristic examples of urban architecture in Ermoupoli.

- Seal

- Location within the regional unit

- Location within Greece
- Coordinates: 37°26′N 24°55′E
- Country: Greece
- Administrative region: South Aegean
- Regional unit: Syros
- Municipality: Syros-Ermoupoli
- City established: 1820s

Area
  - Municipal unit: 11.2 km^{2} (4.3 sq mi)
- Elevation: 20 m (66 ft)

Population (2021)
  - Municipal unit: 13,399
  - Municipal unit density: 1,200/km^{2} (3,100/sq mi)
  - Community: 11,039
- Time zone: UTC+2 (EET)
  - Summer (DST): UTC+3 (EEST)
- Postal code: 841 00
- Area code: 22810
- Vehicle registration: ΕΜ
- Website: www.hermoupolis.gr

Ermoupoli (Greek: Ερμούπολη), also known by the formal older name Ermoupolis or Hermoupolis (Greek: Ἑρμούπολις < Ἑρμοῦ πόλις "Town of Hermes"), is a town and former municipality on the island of Syros, in the Cyclades, Greece. Since the 2011 local government reform, it is part of the municipality Syros-Ermoupoli, of which it is the seat and a municipal unit. It is also the capital of the South Aegean region. The municipal unit has an area of 11.18 km^{2}.

== History ==
Ermoupoli was founded during the Greek Revolution in the 1820s, as an extension to the existing Ano Syros township, by refugees from other Greek islands because of the War. It soon became the leading commercial and industrial center of Greece, as well as its main port. The renowned Greek Steamship Company was founded in the city in 1856. Thousands of ships were built in the various Syros shipyards.

Eventually Ermoupoli was eclipsed by Piraeus in the late 19th century. In the following decades the city declined, remaining the administrative center of the Cyclades islands. In the end of the 20th and the beginning of the 21st century, its economy has significantly improved, based on the sectors of services, industry, education and tourism.

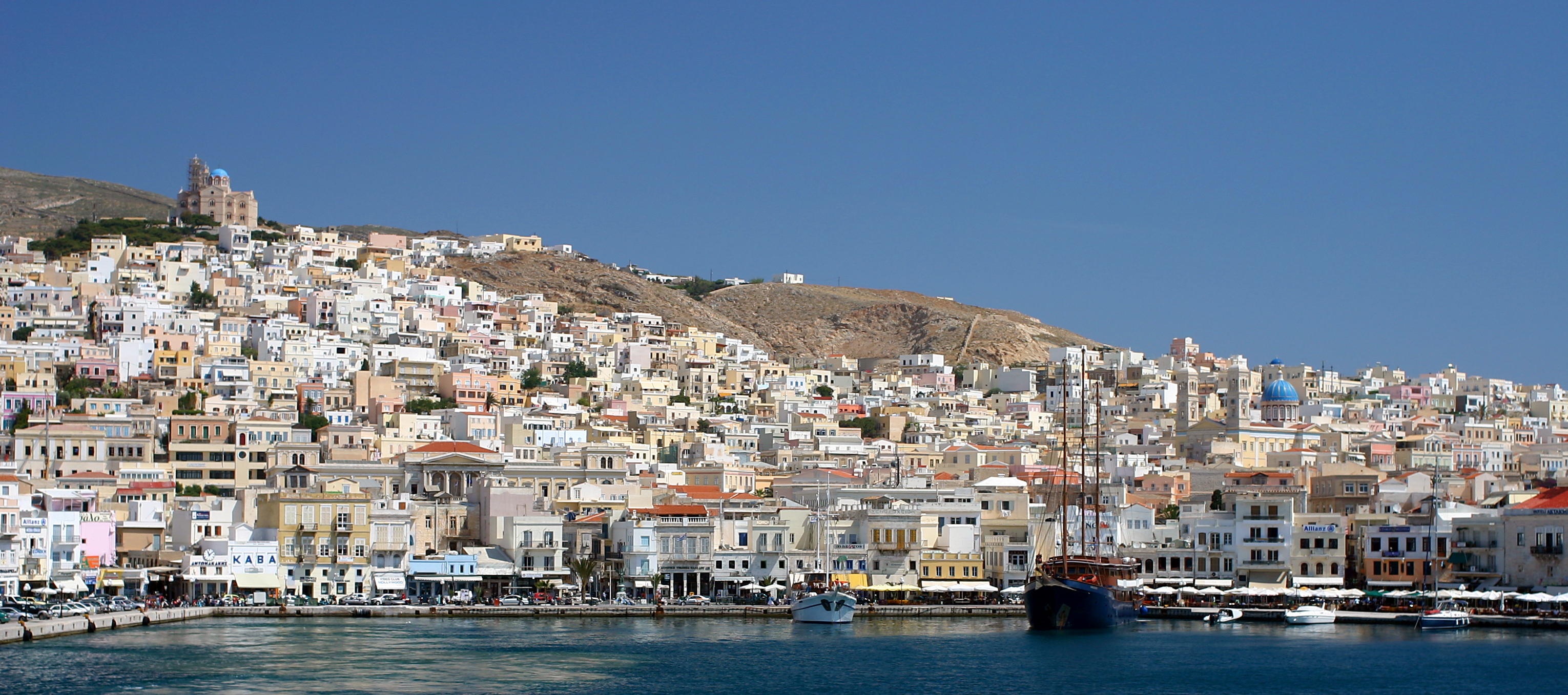
Panoramic view of the harbour.

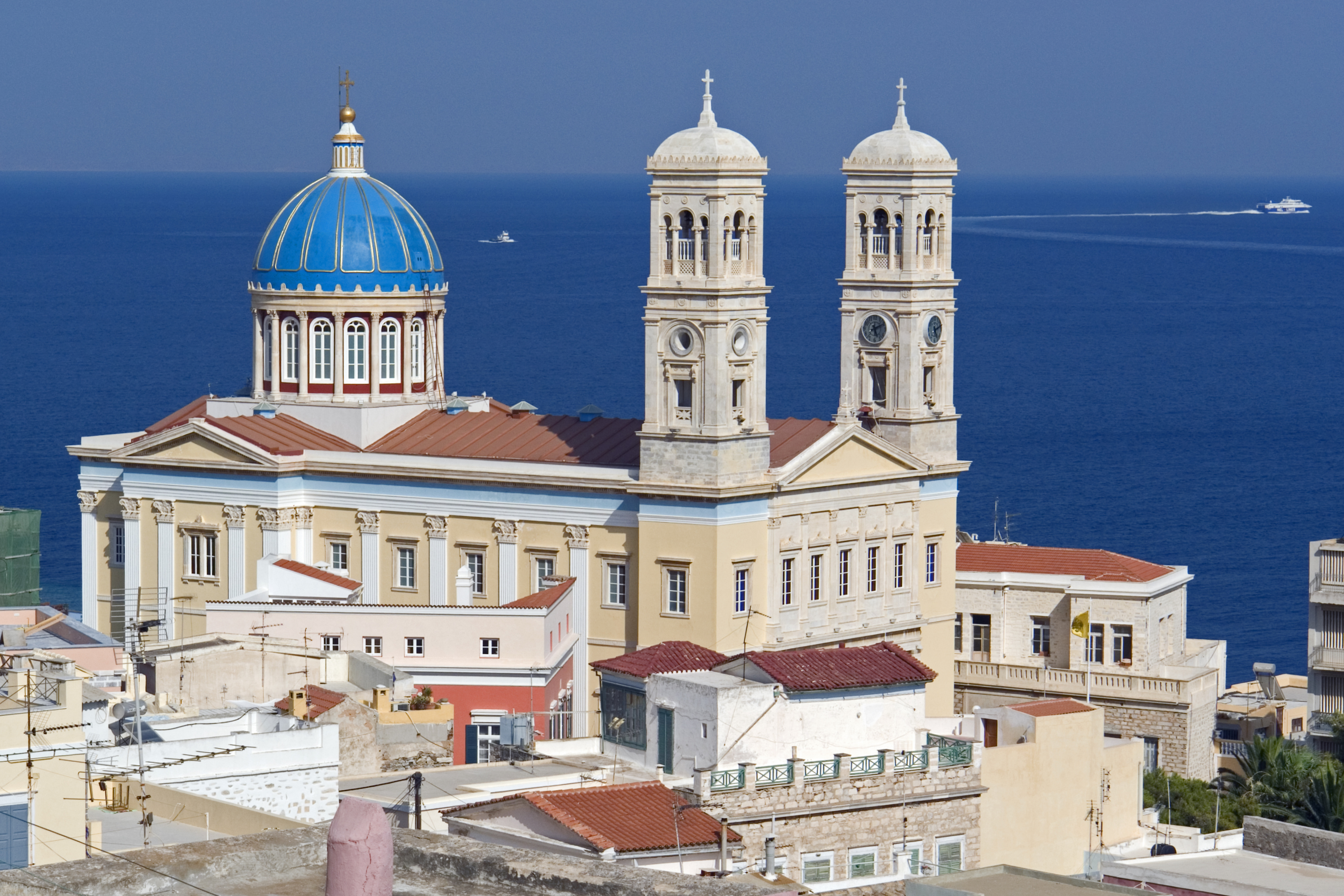
The Cathedral of Saint Nicholas, patron saint of the city.

== Geography ==
=== Climate ===
Climate data for Ermoupoli, Greece
Month	Jan	Feb	Mar	Apr	May	Jun	Jul	Aug	Sep	Oct	Nov	Dec	Year
Mean daily maximum °F (°C)	55 (13)	56 (13)	60 (16)	67 (19)	75 (24)	84 (29)	87 (31)	86 (30)	81 (27)	74 (23)	65 (18)	58 (14)	71 (21)
Mean daily minimum °F (°C)	47 (8)	47 (8)	49 (9)	54 (12)	60 (16)	68 (20)	72 (22)	73 (23)	68 (20)	62 (17)	56 (13)	50 (10)	59 (15)
Source: <World Weather Online= >"Ermoupoli Weather". Ermoupolis Monthly Climate Average, Greece. World Weather Online. 2016.

== Notable people ==
- Emmanouil Benakis (1843–1929), merchant and politician
- Olga Broumas (1949), poet and translator
- Manos Eleftheriou (1938–2018), lyricist
- Stelios Mainas (1957), actor
- Michael Melas, father of Pavlos Melas, fighter of the Greek Struggle for Macedonia
- Emmanuel Rhoides (1836–1904), writer and journalist
- Markos Vamvakaris (1905–1972), rebetiko musician
- Demetrius Vikelas (1835–1908), businessman, writer and the first president of the International Olympic Committee

== Gallery ==
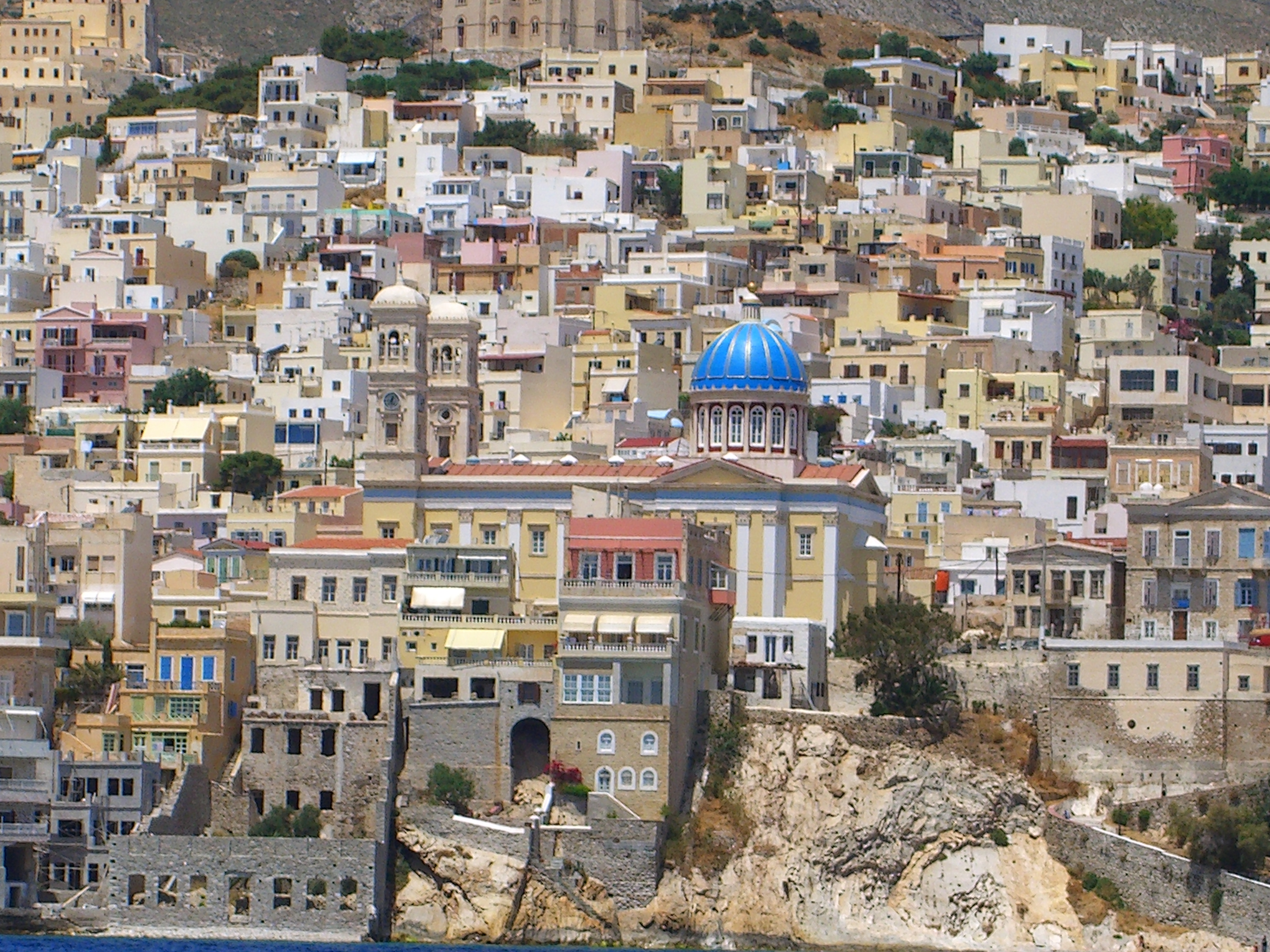
Ermoupolis

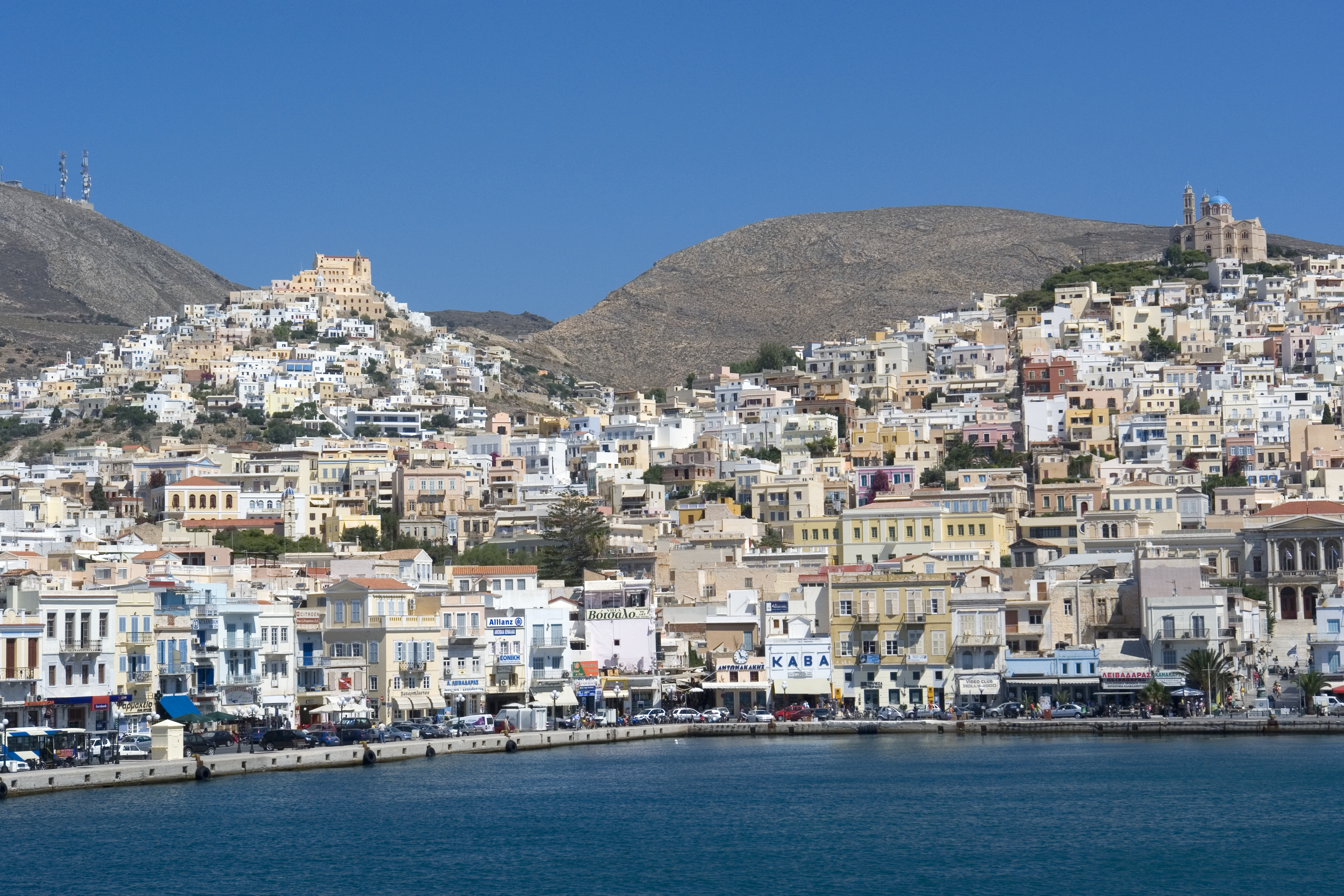
Ano Syros und Ermoupolis

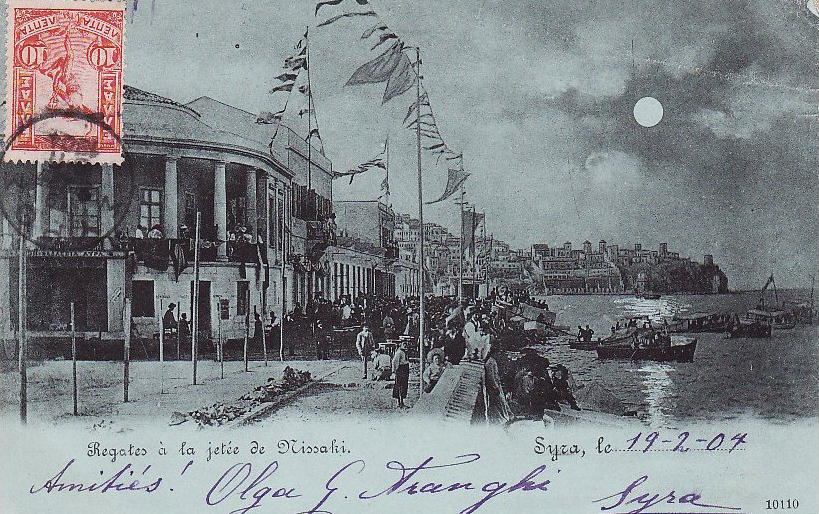
Postcard of Ermoupoli, 1904

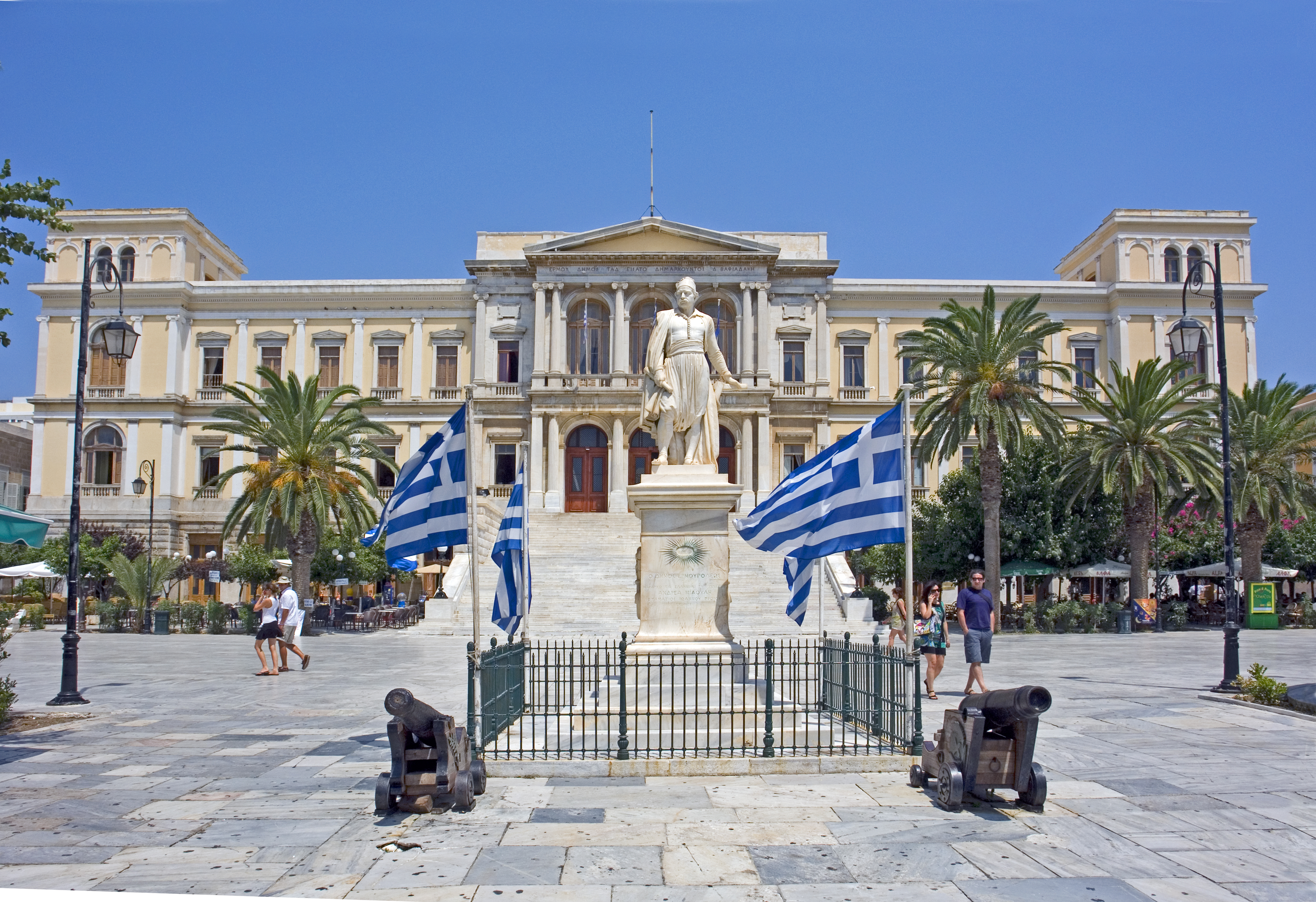
The City Hall, Miaoulis Square

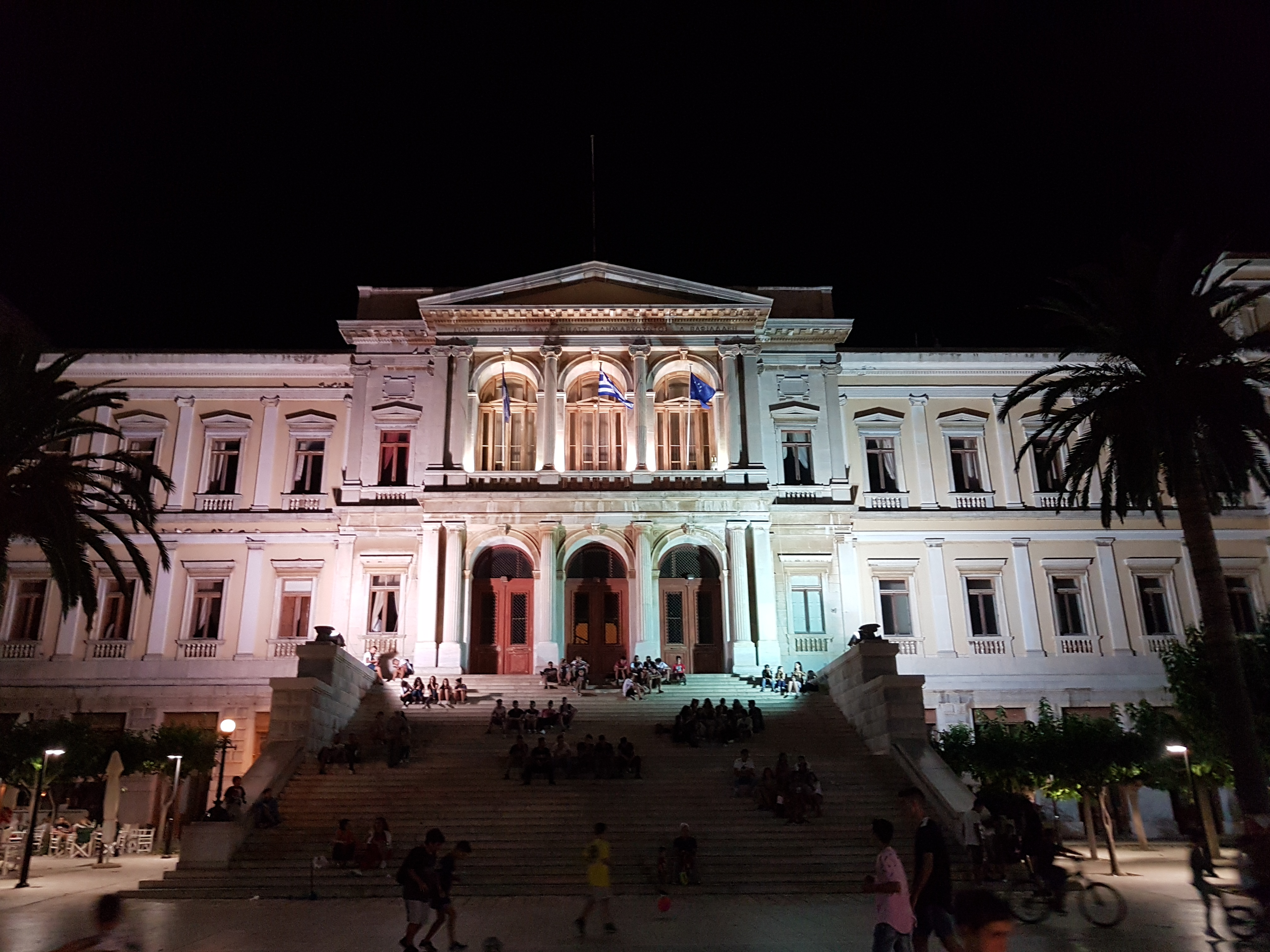
Ermoupoli town hall at night, Syros, 2019

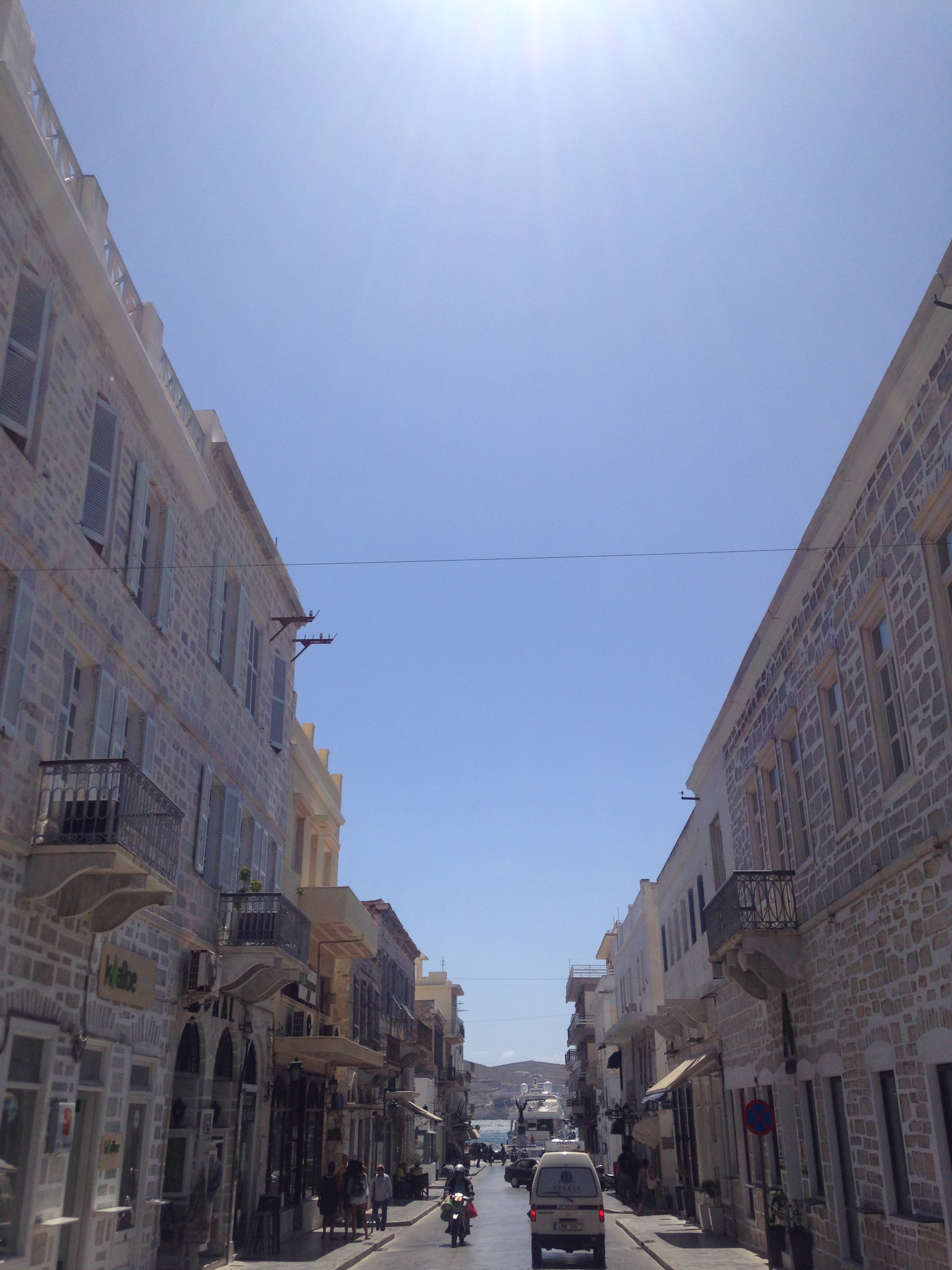
Eleutheriou Venizelou street

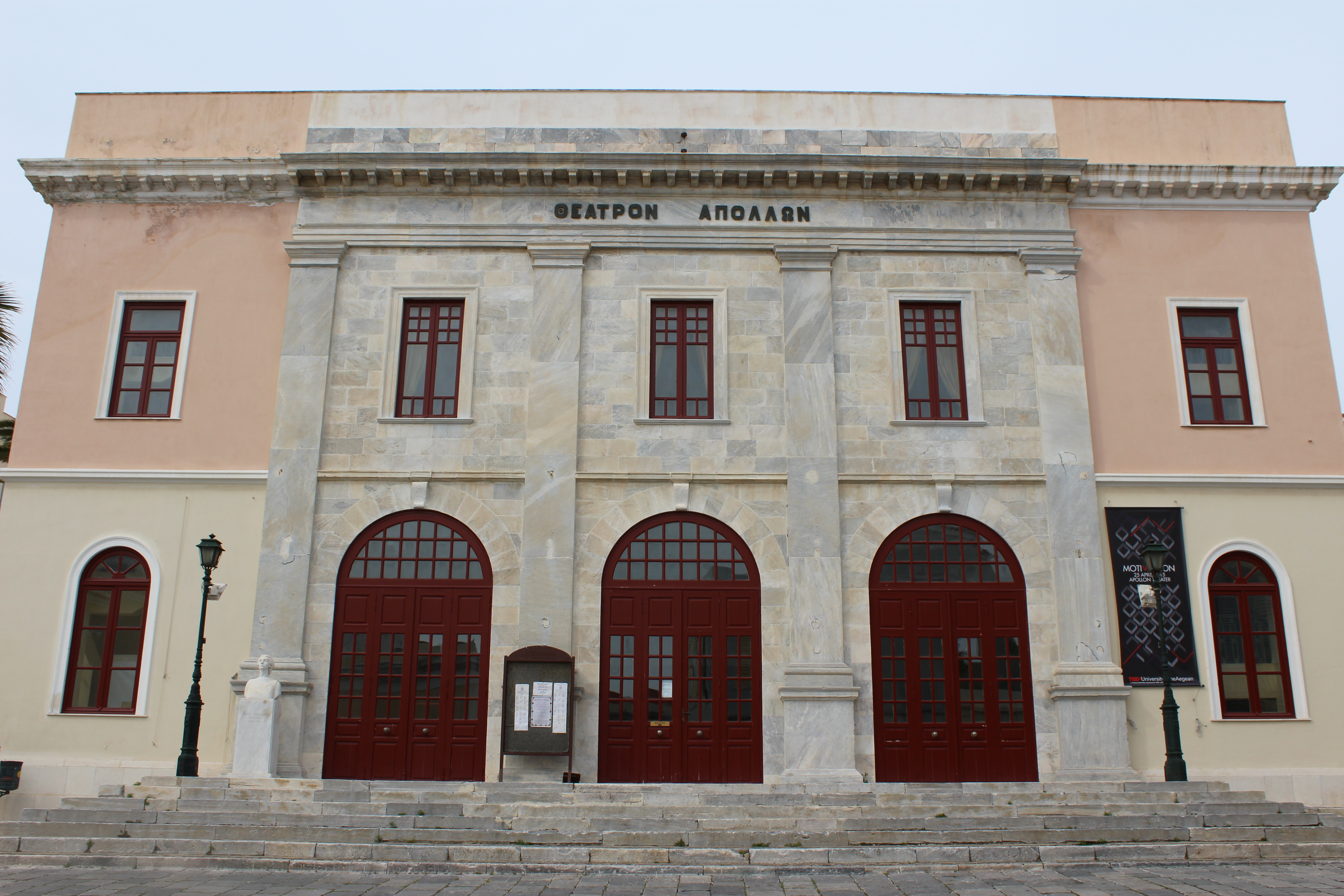
Apollo Theatre

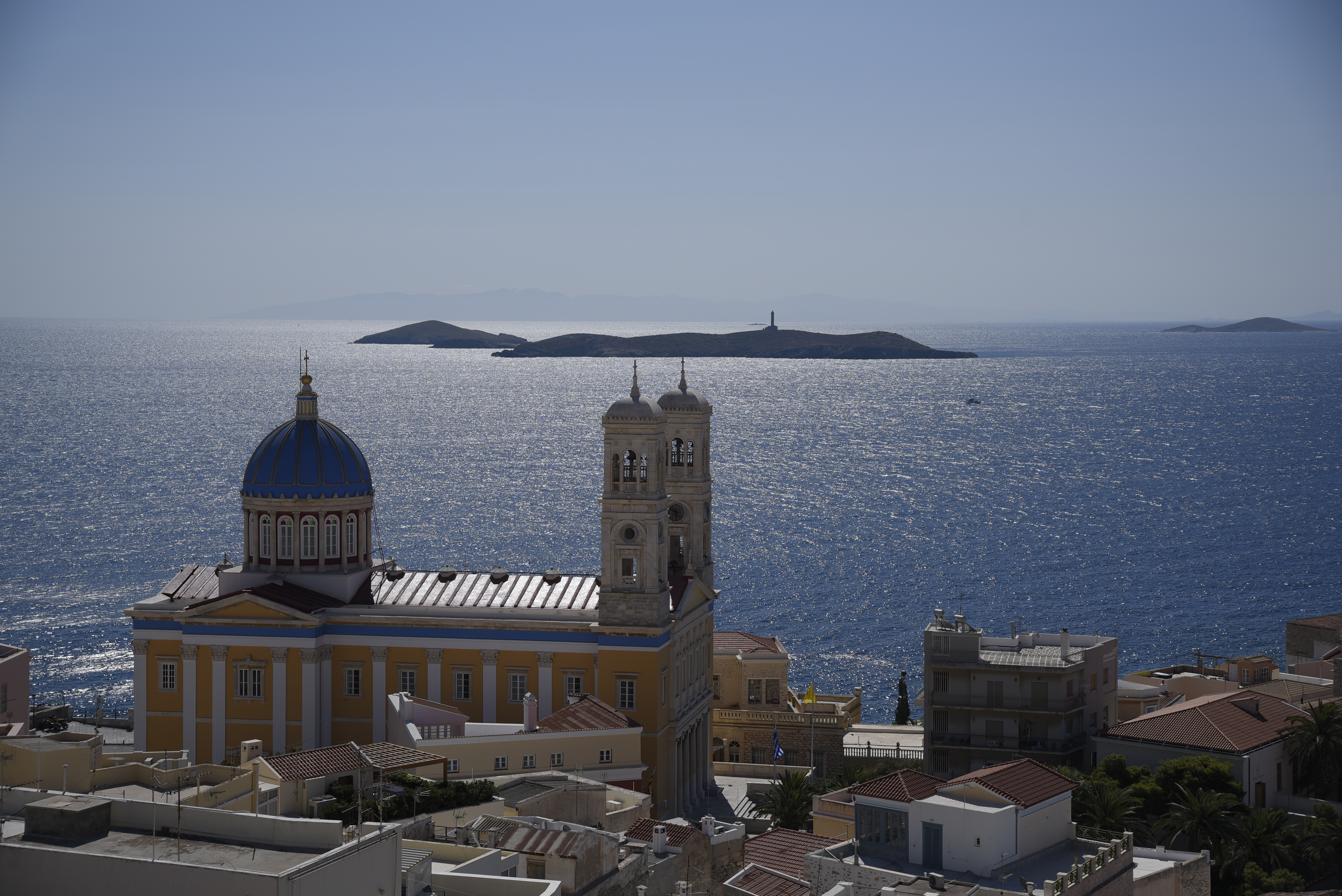
Ermoupoli, Agios Nikolaos & Didymi

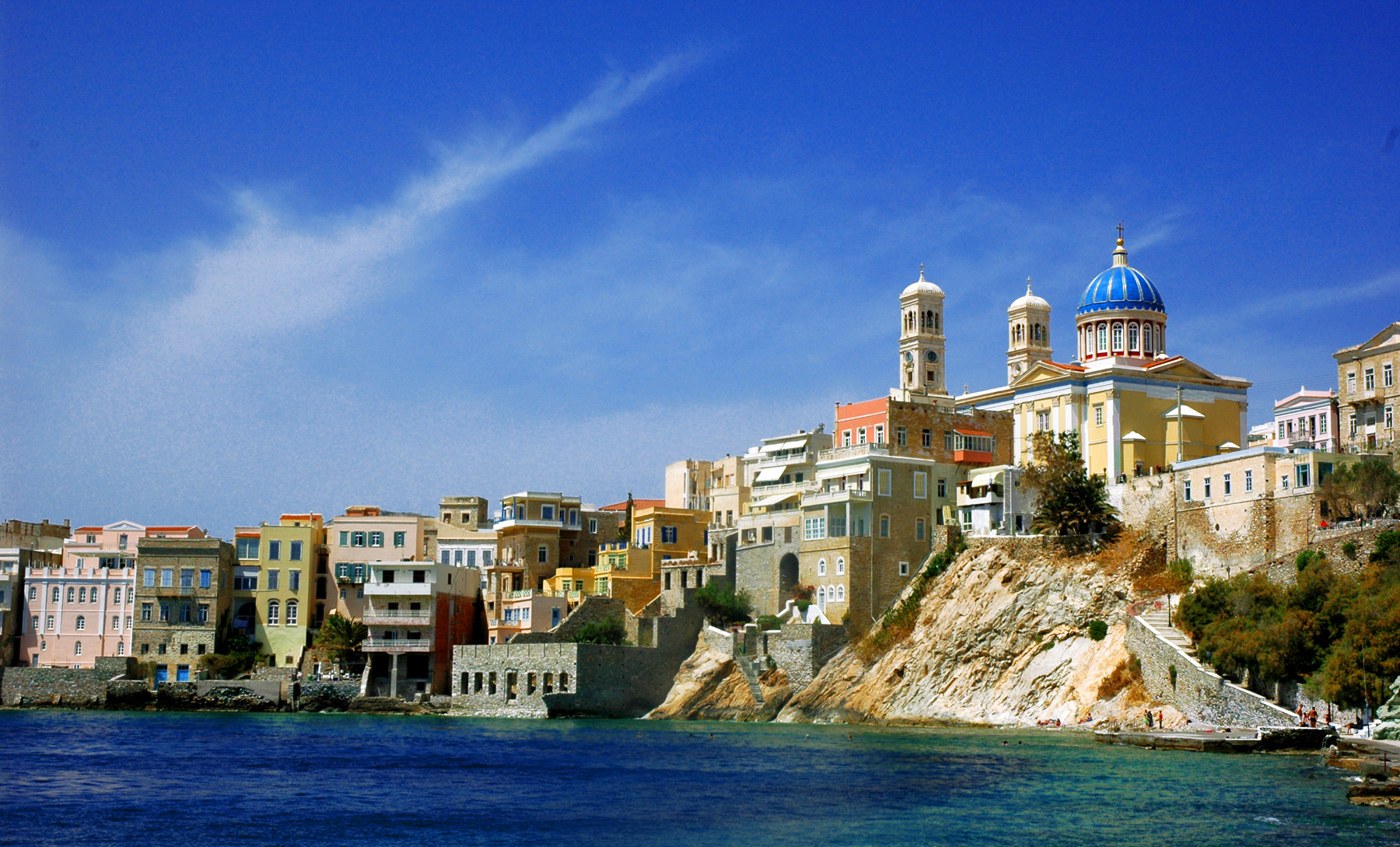
Seaside view of Saint Nicholas Cathedral

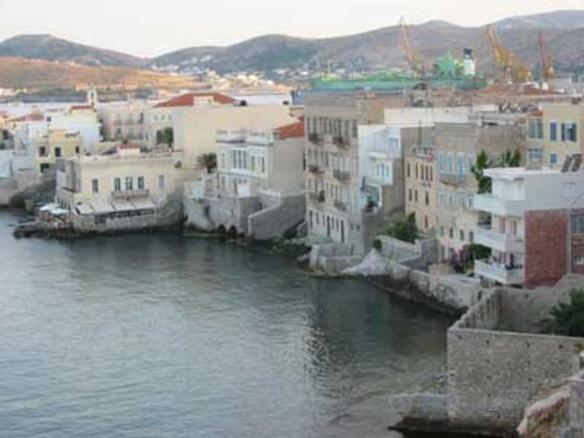
Vaporia district

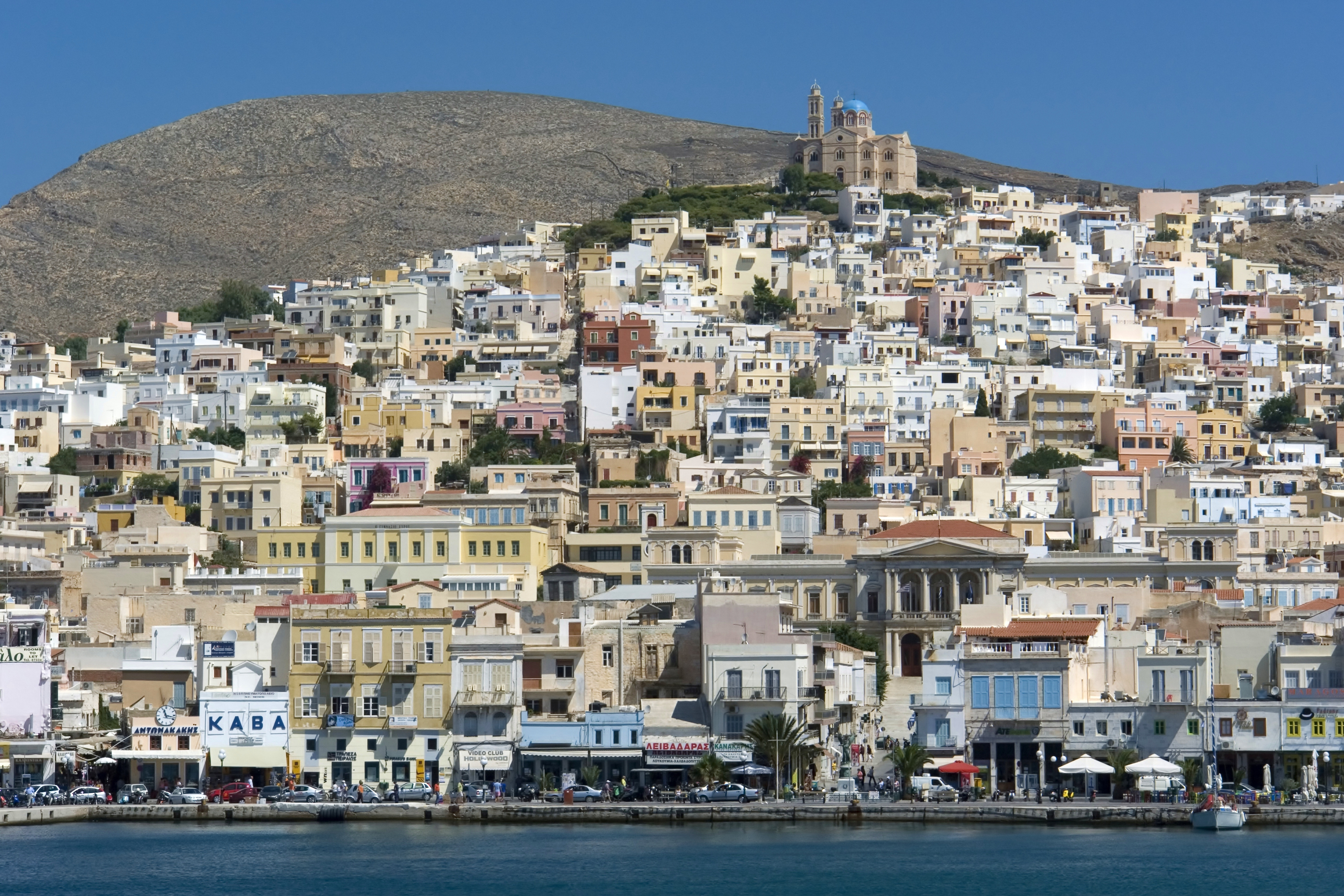
City view from the port

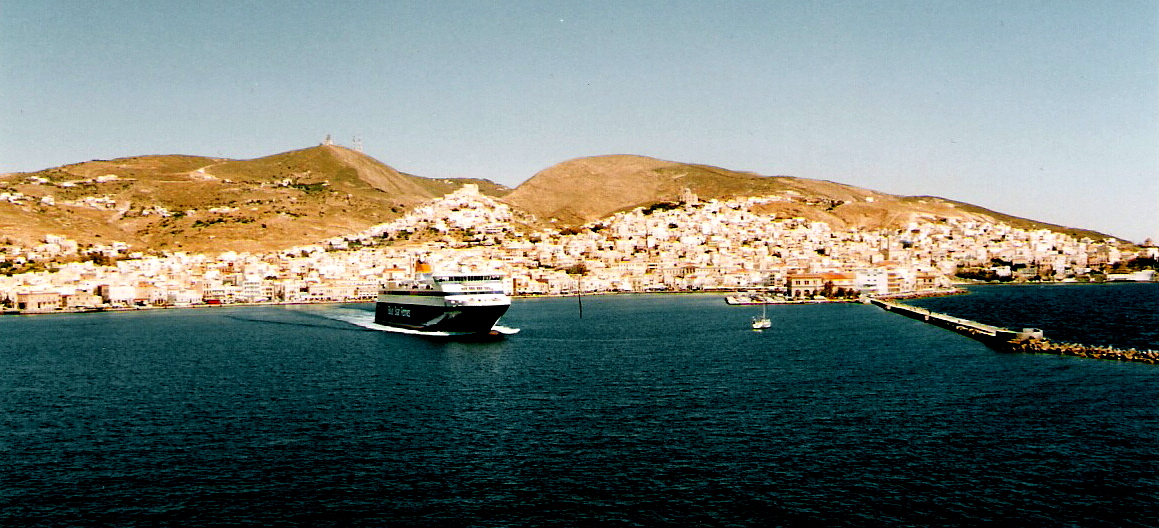
Ermoupolis & Ano Syros

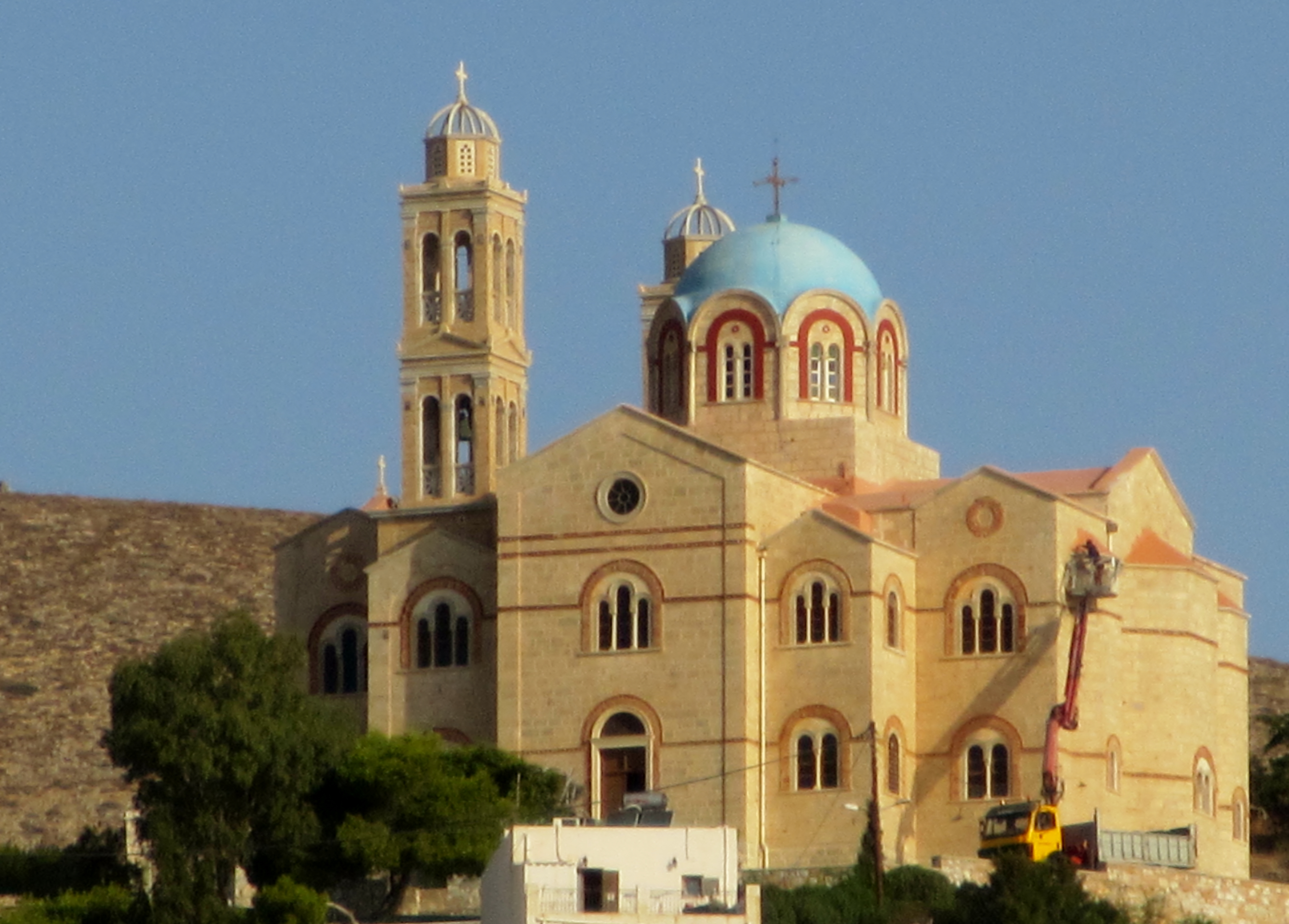
Resurrection Church

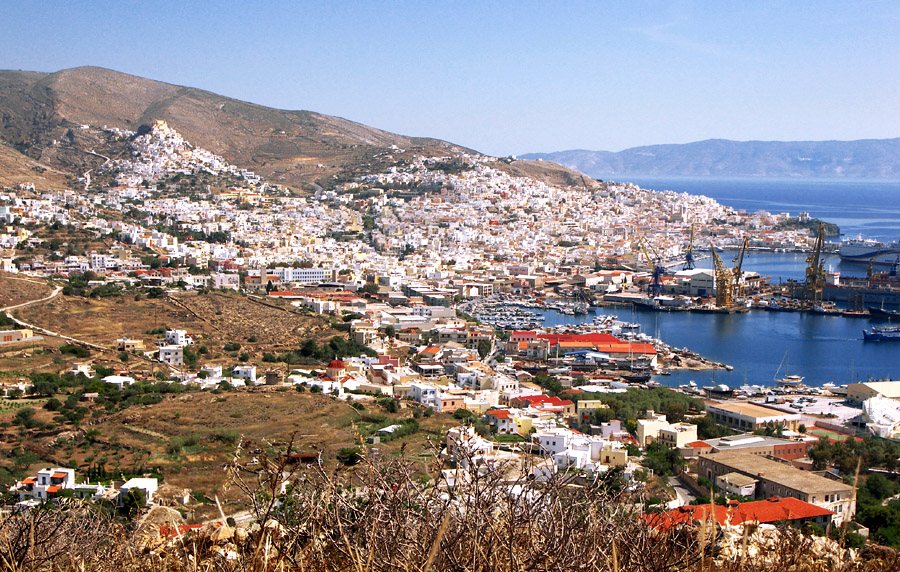
Ermoupolis panorama, Syros, Greece

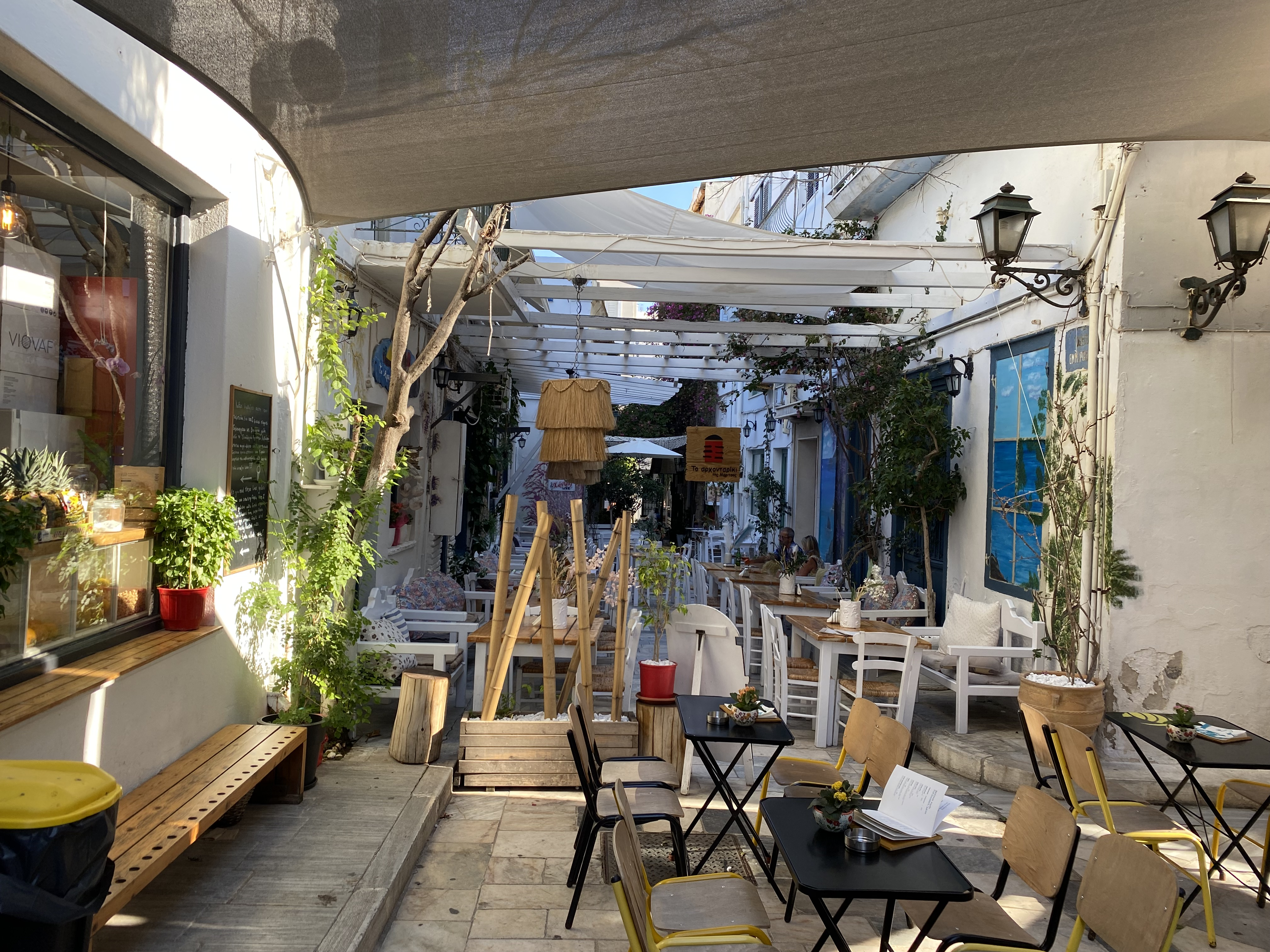
Restaurants on Emmanuel Rhoides street, Ermoupoli
