= Miaouli Square =

- Πλατεία Μιαούλη
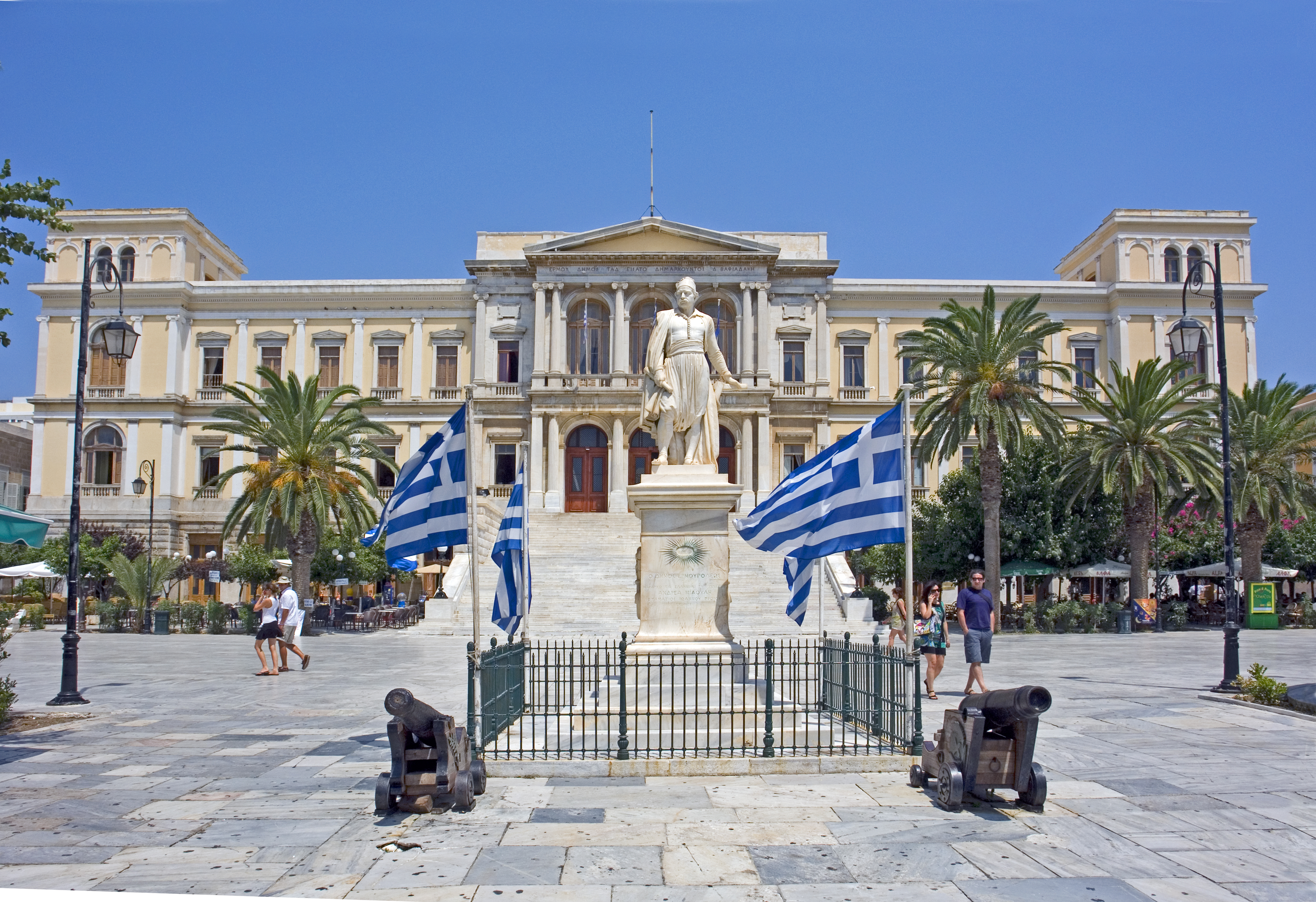

- Location within Greece
- Former names: Othonos Square

General information
- Type: Open square
- Architectural style: Neoclassicism
- Location: Ermoupolis, Greece
- Coordinates: 37.4447°N 24.9428°E

Design and construction
- Architect: Wilhelm von Weiler

Miaouli Square (Greek: Πλατεία Μιαούλη) is a square in the city of Ermoupolis, Syros island in Greece.

== History ==
The square was designed by the Bavarian architect Wilhelm von Weiler in the early 19th century. It is the main square of Ermoupolis. Its former name was Othonos Square (Πλατεία Όθωνος) in honour of Otto of Greece but took its current name in 1889 by the statue of admiral Andreas Miaoulis, hero of the Greek War of Independence, which locates in the square. In the square there are also the City Hall, designed by Ernst Ziller, and the municipal library.

At the beginning of the 19th century, the area of the square was sandy and the only building that existed was the orchard of the Salaha family in the northwest, which had two wells, of which several settlers bought water during those years . The orchard was bought by the Municipality of Ermoupolis in 1847 and the architect Wilhelm von Weiler was immediately commissioned to create a plan for the formation of the square. "Othon Square" in honor of Othon of Greece, the first king of the country.

At that time, the area was covered by all kinds of small buildings (ravines, halls and huts), while the free space covered so many improvised shows, such as the Italian amateur Yabatista (1845) and the wooden amphitheater of German Lamberger (1853). In the years to come, however, the surrounding buildings were built on the standards of the European and mainly Italian cities, giving shape to the square, while the various vendors settled in the newly built Grocery store (1855). In 1860 a first leveling of the soil was completed.

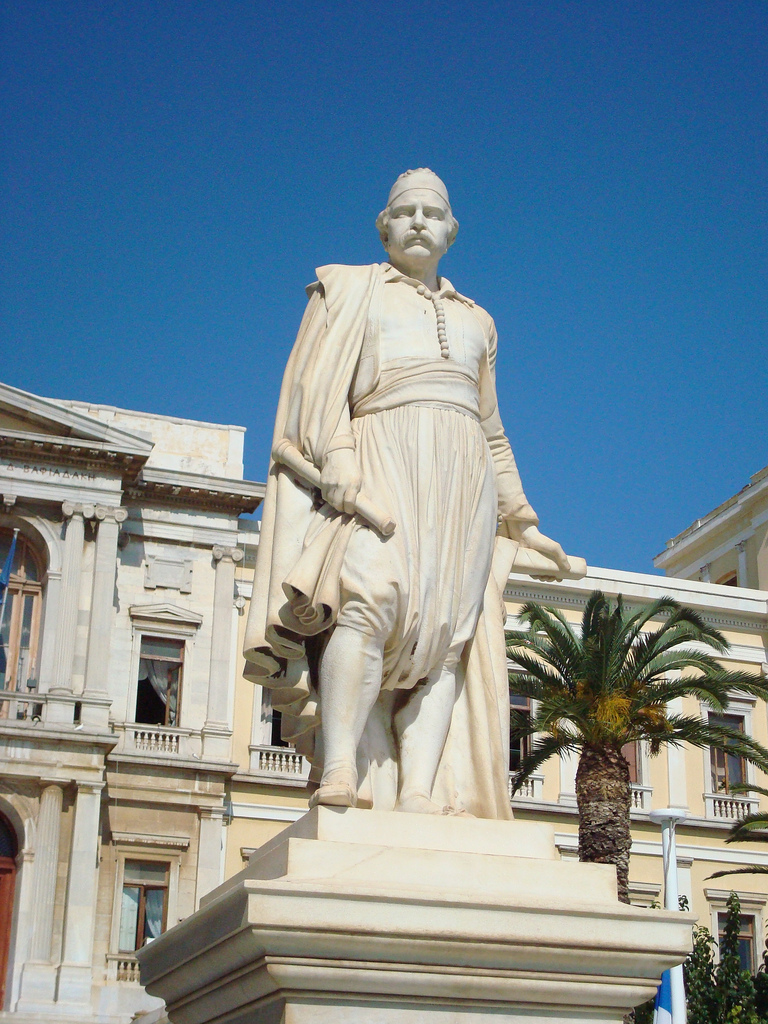
Andreas Miaoulis

In October 1862, the residents of the island were informed of the Otto's eviction in the square and a few days later (October 15th), the square was renamed "Leotsakos Square" in honor of Nikolaos Leotsakos, commander of a relatively small military part of Syros, who on 28 February 1862 headed the military guard of Ermoupolis, who tried to free the political prisoners in Kythnos. In that failed campaign (also known as the Kynithia), Leotsakos was killed along with the officer Moraitin and the student Skarvelis.

It followed the building of the Club in 1863. In 1868, the middle part of the square was covered with marble tiles, while in 1870 the paving of the rest of the sections was completed. In 1876, the town hall was founded and the square began to take its present form. In 1889, Andreas Miaoulis Andreas Miaoulis was unveiled and the square was renamed "Miaouli Square".

Soon the square became the place of concentration of the city's inhabitants. In 1912, a large number of people welcomed Eleftherios Venizelos, while in 1917 Constantine A of Greece, King Constantine, was strongly condemned.

During the Second World War, Italian troops landed in Syros in May 1941, which contributed to the decline of Ermoupolis at that time. However, Greeks and Italians celebrated the announcement to sign a truce between Italy and the Allies from the square's loudspeaker. A little later, however, the island passed into the jurisdiction of the Germans, who bombed the eastern side of the square in September 1944 causing serious damage.

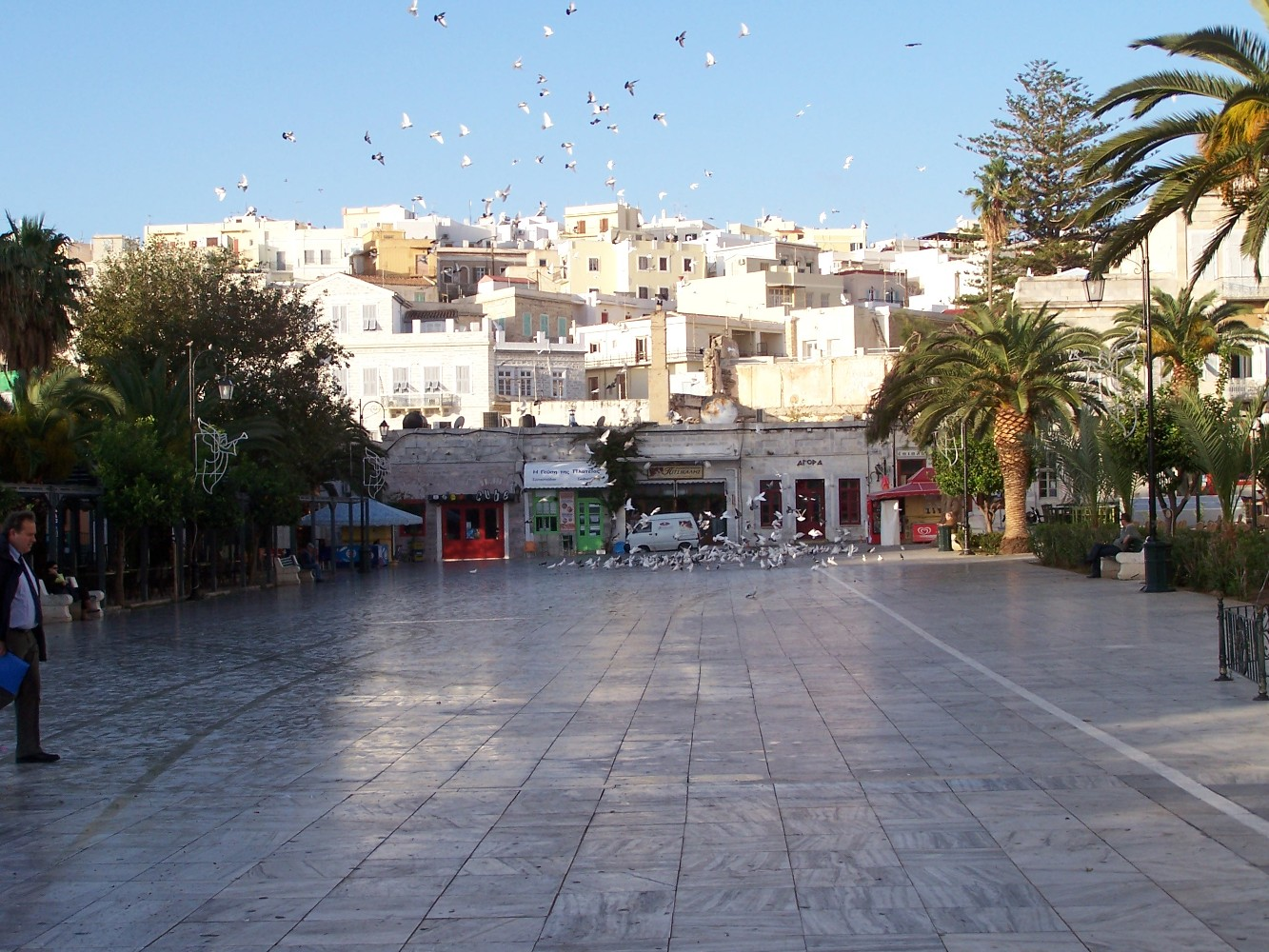
View from the west side of the square

== The Square Today ==
Today, the City Hall of Syros - Ermoupolis, the Historical Archive of Syros and the Municipal Library of Ermoupolis are housed in the square and are always the theater of parades and all kinds of celebrations on the island throughout the year.

Within a short walking distance are the Holy Metropolitan Church of Transfiguration of the Savior of Syros and the Historic 1st High School of Hermoupolis Holy Church of Agios Nikolaos (northeast) and the port of Ermoupolis (south).

== Sources ==
- Miaoulis Square
